= 2024–25 Stanford Cardinal women's basketball team =

Intercollegiate basketball season

2024–25 Stanford Cardinal women's basketball

WBIT, First Round
- Conference: Atlantic Coast Conference
- Record: 16–15 (8–10 ACC)
- Head coach: Kate Paye (1st season)
- Associate head coach: Tempie Brown (9th season)
- Assistant coaches: Katy Steding (5th season); Heather Oesterle (1st season); Erica McCall (2nd season); Jeanette Pholen (1st season)
- Home arena: Maples Pavilion

2024–25 ACC women's basketball standings
	Conf.				Overall
Team	W		L	PCT	W		L	PCT
No. 9 NC State	16	–	2	.889	28	–	7	.800
No. 8 Notre Dame	16	–	2	.889	28	–	6	.824
No. 7 Duke †	14	–	4	.778	29	–	8	.784
No. 22 Florida State	13	–	5	.722	24	–	9	.727
No. 12 North Carolina	13	–	5	.722	29	–	8	.784
Louisville	13	–	5	.722	22	–	11	.667
California	12	–	6	.667	25	–	9	.735
Virginia Tech	9	–	9	.500	19	–	13	.594
Georgia Tech	9	–	9	.500	22	–	11	.667
Virginia	8	–	10	.444	17	–	15	.531
Stanford	8	–	10	.444	16	–	15	.516
Boston College	6	–	12	.333	16	–	18	.471
Syracuse	6	–	12	.333	12	–	18	.400
Clemson	6	–	12	.333	14	–	17	.452
Pittsburgh	5	–	13	.278	13	–	19	.406
Miami (FL)	4	–	14	.222	14	–	15	.483
Wake Forest	2	–	16	.111	9	–	20	.310
SMU	2	–	16	.111	10	–	20	.333
† 2025 ACC tournament winner Rankings from AP Poll

The 2024–25 Stanford Cardinal women's basketball team represented Stanford University during the 2024–25 NCAA Division I women's basketball season. The Cardinal were led by first-year head coach Kate Paye and played their home games at Maples Pavilion in Stanford, California. They compete as first year members of the Atlantic Coast Conference.

Stanford began the season well, winning four straight games and ascending to twenty-fourth in the AP poll. While ranked twenty-fourth, they defeated UC Davis and lost to Indiana. This saw them fall back out of the rankings. They won three straight games after the Indiana defeat but did not re-enter the rankings. They traveled to fifth-ranked LSU for the ACC–SEC Challenge, where they lost 94–90, in overtime. They followed that loss by losing their ACC opener against rival California. They rebounded by defeating UTSA before going on a three-game losing streak. This streak included a loss to eleventh ranked Ohio State and two ACC losses to SMU and Clemson. Their first ACC win came on January 9, 2025, when the Cardinal defeated Florida State 89–84. They continued to struggle, going 2–6 in their next eight ACC games after the loss. They defeated Wake Forest and Pittsburgh. Five of the six losses during the stretch came against ranked teams. The Cardinal finished the season 5–1 while facing zero ranked opponents. Their only loss was a 89–69 defeat during this stretch was at Virginia. They also had close wins during this stretch, defeating Boston College by five points, Virginia Tech by one in overtime, and defeating Georgia Tech on the final day of the regular season by five points.

The Cardinal finished the season 16–15 overall and 8–10 in ACC play to finish in a tie for tenth place. As the eleventh seed in the ACC tournament, they faced fourteenth seed Clemson in the First Round. The Cardinal lost to Clemson for the second time this season, this time 63–46. They received an at-large bid to the WBIT and were the second seed in the St. Joseph's section of the bracket. They lost to unseeded Portland 69–68 in overtime, in the First Round to end their season.

== Previous season ==
The Cardinal the season at 30–6, 15–3 in Pac-12 play to win the regular season championship. As a No. 1 seed in the Pac-12 Tournament, they defeated California in the quarterfinals and Oregon State in the semifinals before losing to USC in the championship. They received an at-large bid to the NCAA Tournament as a No. 2 seed in the Portland regional 4 bracket where they defeated Norfolk State and Iowa State in the first and second rounds before losing to NC State in the Sweet Sixteen.

After the season's conclusion, VanDerveer announced her retirement, making this her 38th and final season as Stanford head coach. This was also the team's final season in the Pac-12, as they will move to the Atlantic Coast Conference beginning on August 1, 2024.

== Offseason ==
=== Departures ===
Departures
Name	Num.	Pos.	Height	Year	Hometown	Reason for departure
Cameron Brink	22	F	6'4"	Senior	Beaverton, Oregon	Graduated; drafted 2nd overall in the 2024 WNBA draft
Hannah Jump	33	G	6'0"	Graduate Student	San Jose, California	Graduated
Kiki Iriafen	44	F	6'3"	Junior	Los Angeles, California	Transferred to USC

=== Incoming transfers ===
Incoming transfers
Name	Num.	Pos.	Height	Year	Hometown	Previous School
[[Mary Ashley Stevenson {{{last}}}]]	22	F	6'2"	Sophomore	New York City, New York	Purdue
Tess Heal	34	G	5'10"	Junior	Melbourne, Australia	Santa Clara

=== Recruiting ===
College recruiting
Name	Hometown	School	Height	Weight	Commit date
Shay Ijiwoye; PG	Phoenix, Arizona	Desert Vista	5 ft 6 in (1.68 m)	N/A	Oct 17, 2023
Shay Ijiwoye; PG	Recruit ratings: ESPN: (94)				
Kennedy Ume; F	Columbia, Maryland	McDonogh	6 ft 4 in (1.93 m)	N/A	Aug 19, 2023
Kennedy Ume; F	Recruit ratings: ESPN: (94)				
Harper Peterson; F	Rocklin, California	Whitney	6 ft 3 in (1.91 m)	N/A	Nov 20, 2023
Harper Peterson; F	Recruit ratings: ESPN: (92)				
Overall recruit ranking:
Note: In many cases, Scout, Rivals, 247Sports, On3, and ESPN may conflict in their listings of height and weight.; In these cases, the average was taken. ESPN grades are on a 100-point scale.; Sources:

== Roster ==
2024–25 Stanford Cardinal women's basketball team
Players
Coaches

Pos.	#	Name	Height	Year	Previous school	Hometown
F	3	Nunu Agara	6 ft 2 in (1.88 m)	Fr	Hopkins	Minnetonka, MN
G	6	Shay Ijiwoye	5 ft 6 in (1.68 m)	Fr	Desert Vista	Phoenix, AZ
G	10	Talana Lepolo	5 ft 7 in (1.7 m)	So	Carondelet	Alameda, CA
G	13	Chloe Clardy	5 ft 9 in (1.75 m)	So	Conway	Conway, AR
F	15	Harper Peterson	6 ft 3 in (1.91 m)	Fr	Whitney	Rocklin, CA
G	20	Elena Bosgana	6 ft 2 in (1.88 m)	Sr	American Community	Athens, Greece
F	21	Brooke Demetre	6 ft 3 in (1.91 m)	Sr	Mater Dei	Foothill Ranch, CA
F	22	Mary Ashley Stevenson	6 ft 2 in (1.88 m)	So	Dalton; Purdue	New York, NY
G	24	Stavi Papadaki	5 ft 11 in (1.8 m)	Jr	2nd EPAL Chanion	Chania, Greece
G	31	Lauren Green	5 ft 8 in (1.73 m)	Jr	Castro Valley	Castro Valley, CA
G	32	Jzaniya Harriel	5 ft 10 in (1.78 m)	RS Jr	Antelope	Sacramento, CA
G	34	Tess Heal	5 ft 10 in (1.78 m)	Jr	Lowther Hall; Santa Clara	Melbourne, Australia
F	40	Courtney Ogden	6 ft 1 in (1.85 m)	So	Westminster School	Atlanta, GA
C	45	Kennedy Umeh	6 ft 4 in (1.93 m)	Fr	McDonogh	Columbia, MD

Head coach

- Kate Paye (Stanford)

Assistant coach(es)

- Tempie Brown (Michigan)
- Katy Steding (Stanford)
- Heather Oesterle (Michigan)
- Erica McCall (Stanford)
- Jeanette Pholen (Stanford)

Legend

- (C) Team captain
- (S) Suspended
- (I) Ineligible
- (W) Walk-on
- Injured
- Current redshirt

Roster
Last update: August 30, 2024

== Schedule and results ==
Date time, TV	Rank^{#}	Opponent^{#}	Result	Record	High points	High rebounds	High assists	Site (attendance) city, state
Exhibition
October 30, 2024*; 7:00 p.m.		Cal State LA	W 91–70	—	25 – Agara	13 – Agara	5 – Agara	Maples Pavilion (2,197); Stanford, CA
Regular season
November 4, 2024*; 7:00 p.m., ACCNX		Le Moyne	W 107–43	1–0	24 – Harriel	10 – Stevenson	5 – Stevenson	Maples Pavilion (2,887); Stanford, CA
November 7, 2024*; 7:00 p.m., ACCNX		Washington State	W 94–65	2–0	19 – Bosgana	8 – Agara	4 – Agara	Maples Pavilion (2,428); Stanford, CA
November 10, 2024*; 12:00 p.m., ESPN2		Gonzaga	W 89–58	3–0	16 – Agara	9 – Agara	3 – Tied	Maples Pavilion (3,865); Stanford, CA
November 13, 2024*; 7:00 p.m., ACCNX	No. 24	UC Davis	W 69–56	4–0	25 – Agara	10 – Agara	2 – Tied	Maples Pavilion (2,499); Stanford, CA
November 17, 2024*; 11:00 a.m., FS1	No. 24	at Indiana	L 66–79	4–1	15 – Agara	7 – Demetre	4 – Agara	Simon Skjodt Assembly Hall (10,351); Bloomington, IN
November 22, 2024*; 7:00 p.m., ACCNX		Morgan State	W 91–49	5–1	15 – Demetre	10 – Umeh	6 – Bosgana	Maples Pavilion (2,540); Stanford, CA
November 25, 2024*; 7:00 p.m., ACCNX		Cal Poly	W 81–45	6–1	17 – Demetre	7 – Tied	3 – Tied	Maples Pavilion (2,733); Stanford, CA
November 29, 2024*; 2:00 p.m., ACCNX		UC San Diego	W 84–54	7–1	26 – Bosgana	6 – Tied	4 – Bosgana	Maples Pavilion (3,001); Stanford, CA
December 5, 2024*; 6:00 p.m., ESPN2		at No. 5 LSU; ACC–SEC Challenge	L 88–94 ^{OT}	7–2	29 – Agara	13 – Agara	3 – Tied	Pete Maravich Assembly Center (10,317); Baton Rouge, LA
December 13, 2024; 7:00 p.m., ACCNX		at California	L 63–83	7–3 (0–1)	18 – Demetre	9 – Bosgana	4 – Agara	Haas Pavilion (3,189); Berkeley, CA
December 16, 2024*; 12:00 p.m., ACCNX		UTSA	W 62–57	8–3	13 – Bosgana	11 – Bosgana	3 – Tied	Maples Pavilion (4,600); Stanford, CA
December 20, 2024*; 5:30 p.m., FS1		vs. No. 11 Ohio State; Invisalign Bay Area Women's Classic	L 59–84	8–4	17 – Agara	11 – Bosgana	2 – Heal	Chase Center (3,766); San Francisco, CA
January 2, 2025; 5:00 p.m., ACCN		at SMU	L 63–67	8–5 (0–2)	20 – Bosgana	12 – Agara	3 – Tied	Moody Coliseum (1,446); University Park, TX
January 5, 2025; 11:00 a.m., The CW		at Clemson	L 61–65 ^{OT}	8–6 (0–3)	18 – Agara	12 – Bosgana	2 – Tied	Littlejohn Coliseum (2,418); Clemson, SC
January 9, 2025; 7:00 p.m., ACCNX		Florida State	W 89–84	9–6 (1–3)	24 – Demetre	15 – Bosgana	6 – Bosgana	Maples Pavilion (2,660); Stanford, CA
January 12, 2025; 12:00 p.m., ESPN		No. 21 NC State	L 67–81	9–7 (1–4)	17 – Clardy	10 – Agara	4 – Tied	Maples Pavilion (3,735); Stanford, CA
January 16, 2025; 3:00 p.m., ACCNX		at Wake Forest	W 74–71	10–7 (2–4)	23 – Agara	7 – Agara	4 – Bosgana	LJVM Coliseum (926); Winston-Salem, NC
January 19, 2025; 10:00 a.m., ESPN2		at No. 16 Duke	L 49–74	10–8 (2–5)	15 – Agara	10 – Agara	3 – Clardy	Cameron Indoor Stadium (4,701); Durham, NC
January 23, 2025; 7:00 p.m., ACCNX		No. 22 California	L 72–75	10–9 (2–6)	22 – Clardy	6 – Agara	3 – Tied	Maples Pavilion (3,599); Stanford, CA
January 30, 2025; 7:00 p.m., ACCNX		Pittsburgh	W 58–46	11–9 (3–6)	14 – Tied	9 – Ogden	4 – Demetre	Maples Pavilion (2,807); Stanford, CA
February 2, 2025; 12:00 p.m., The CW		No. 15 North Carolina	L 67–69	11–10 (3–7)	22 – Agara	14 – Agara	4 – Bosgana	Maples Pavilion (4,181); Stanford, CA
February 6, 2025; 5:30 p.m., ESPN		at No. 3 Notre Dame	L 47–96	11–11 (3–8)	10 – Heal	9 – Umeh	2 – Tied	Purcell Pavilion (7,528); Notre Dame, IN
February 9, 2025; 9:00 a.m., ESPN2		at Louisville	L 65–74	11–12 (3–9)	16 – Clardy	10 – Bosgana	3 – Demetre	KFC Yum! Center (8,281); Louisville, KY
February 13, 2025; 7:00 p.m., ACCN		Syracuse	W 79–58	12–12 (4–9)	18 – Bosgana	11 – Bosgana	12 – Clardy	Maples Pavilion (2,914); Stanford, CA
February 16, 2025; 2:00 p.m., ACCNX		Boston College	W 80–75	13–12 (5–9)	23 – Heal	8 – Tied	5 – Stevenson	Maples Pavilion (3,561); Stanford, CA
February 20, 2025; 5:00 p.m., ACCN		at Virginia Tech	W 75–74 ^{OT}	14–12 (6–9)	30 – Clardy	7 – Tied	5 – Clardy	Cassell Coliseum (4,949); Blacksburg, VA
February 23, 2025; 3:00 p.m., ACCN		at Virginia	L 69–89	14–13 (6–10)	17 – Ogden	8 – Ogden	8 – Ogden	John Paul Jones Arena (4,797); Charlottesville, VA
February 27, 2025; 7:00 p.m., ACCNX		Miami (FL)	W 86–69	15–13 (7–10)	19 – Demetre	5 – Demetre	6 – Tied	Maples Pavilion (3,309); Stanford, CA
March 2, 2025; 2:00 p.m., ACCNX		Georgia Tech	W 87–82	16–13 (8–10)	19 – Bosgana	6 – Bosgana	3 – Tied	Maples Pavilion (4,400); Stanford, CA
ACC Women's Tournament
March 5, 2025*; 3:30 p.m., ACCN	(11)	vs. (14) Clemson; First Round	L 46–63	16–14	13 – Ogden	9 – Bosgana	2 – Tied	Greensboro Coliseum (6,932); Greensboro, NC
WBIT
March 20, 2025*; 7:00 p.m., ESPN+	(2)	Portland; First Round	L 68–69 ^{OT}	16–15	21 – Agara	12 – Agara	4 – Clardy	Maples Pavilion (1,106); Stanford, CA
*Non-conference game. ^{#}Rankings from AP poll. (#) Tournament seedings in parentheses. All times are in PST.

== Rankings ==
Ranking movements Legend: ██ Increase in ranking ██ Decrease in ranking — = Not ranked RV = Received votes
	Week																				
Poll	Pre	1	2	3	4	5	6	7	8	9	10	11	12	13	14	15	16	17	18	19	Final
AP	RV	24	RV	RV	RV	RV	—	—	—	—	—	—	—	—	—	—	—	—	—	—	
Coaches	RV	23	RV	RV	RV	RV	—	—	—	—	—	—	—	—	—	—	—	—	—	—	
