= 2024–25 Long Beach State Beach women's basketball team =

American college basketball season

2024–25 Long Beach State Beach women's basketball
- Conference: Big West Conference
- Record: 16–14 (12–8 Big West)
- Head coach: Amy Wright (2nd season)
- Assistant coaches: Brian Rosario; Jashae Lee; Raru Archer
- Home arena: Walter Pyramid

2024–25 Big West women's basketball standings
	Conf.				Overall
Team	W		L	PCT	W		L	PCT
Hawai'i	16	–	4	.800	22	–	10	.688
UC Irvine	15	–	5	.750	21	–	10	.677
UC Davis	13	–	7	.650	21	–	12	.636
UC San Diego †	13	–	7	.650	20	–	16	.556
UC Santa Barbara	12	–	8	.600	18	–	13	.581
Long Beach State	12	–	8	.600	16	–	14	.533
UC Riverside	12	–	8	.600	17	–	15	.531
Cal Poly	8	–	12	.400	14	–	18	.438
Cal State Fullerton	5	–	15	.250	7	–	23	.233
Cal State Bakersfield	2	–	18	.100	2	–	28	.067
Cal State Northridge	2	–	18	.100	4	–	25	.138
† 2025 Big West tournament winner

The 2024–25 Long Beach State Beach women's basketball team represented California State University, Long Beach during the 2024–25 NCAA Division I women's basketball season. The Beach, led by second-year head coach Amy Wright, played their home games at the Walter Pyramid in Long Beach, California as members of the Big West Conference.

== Previous season ==
The Beach finished the 2023–24 season 15–18, 8–12 in Big West play, to finish in a tie for seventh place. They defeated UC Santa Barbara and upset UC Riverside, before falling to eventual tournament champions UC Irvine in the semifinals of the Big West tournament.

== Roster ==
2024–25 Long Beach State Beach women's basketball team
Players
Coaches

Pos.	#	Name	Height	Year	Previous school	Hometown
G	0	Lauren Cummings	6 ft 0 in (1.83 m)	So	Billings Senior High School	Billings, MT
G	1	Lovely Sonnier	6 ft 0 in (1.83 m)	Sr	South Carolina State	San Francisco, CA
G	2	Savannah Tucker	5 ft 9 in (1.75 m)	Sr	Clovis North High School	Fresno, CA
G	3	Patricia Chung	5 ft 8 in (1.73 m)	Sr	Mark Keppel High School	Monterey Park, CA
G	4	Tairat Samuel-Afolabi	5 ft 7 in (1.7 m)	Fr	Fryshuset Gymnasium	Stockholm, Sweden
F	5	Kennan Ka	6 ft 0 in (1.83 m)	RS So	Mission Hills High School	San Diego, CA
G	10	Christy Reynoso	5 ft 4 in (1.63 m)	Fr	Sierra Canyon School	Los Angeles, CA
F	11	Rachel Loobie	6 ft 1 in (1.85 m)	GS	Wright State	Indianapolis, IN
F	12	Jada Crawshaw	6 ft 0 in (1.83 m)	So	Sydney Comets	Darwin, Australia
F	21	Brelynn Brice	5 ft 10 in (1.78 m)	Fr	Lincoln High School	Stockton, CA
F	22	Mykelle Richards	6 ft 1 in (1.85 m)	Fr	Etiwanda High School	San Bernardino, CA
G	30	JaQuoia Jones-Brown	5 ft 6 in (1.68 m)	Fr	Westlake High School	Atlanta, GA
C	33	Haley Wright	6 ft 3 in (1.91 m)	Fr	Valencia Basket	Valencia, Spain
F	42	Judit Oliva Fernandez	6 ft 2 in (1.88 m)	RS Fr	South Florida	El Prat de Llobregat, Spain

Head coach

- Amy Wright (Arkansas)

Assistant coach(es)

- Brian Rosario (San Diego)
- Jashae Lee (Murray State)
- Raru Archer (Texas Southern)

Legend

- (C) Team captain
- (S) Suspended
- (I) Ineligible
- (W) Walk-on
- Injured
- Current redshirt

Roster
Last update: January 20, 2025

== Schedule and results ==
Date time, TV	Rank^{#}	Opponent^{#}	Result	Record	High points	High rebounds	High assists	Site (attendance) city, state
Exhibition
November 6, 2024*; 6:00 p.m.		Cal State Los Angeles	W 77–67	–	15 – Crawshaw	12 – Chung	4 – Chung	Walter Pyramid (645); Long Beach, CA
Regular season
November 9, 2024*; 2:00 p.m., ESPN+		William & Mary	W 67–65	1–0	13 – Sonnier	8 – 2 tied	3 – 3 tied	Walter Pyramid (1,093); Long Beach, CA
November 15, 2024*; 6:00 p.m., ESPN+		at Pacific	L 65–81	1–1	16 – Tucker	8 – Jones-Brown	5 – Tucker	Alex G. Spanos Center (553); Stockton, CA
November 17, 2024*; 2:00 p.m., ESPN+		at Sacramento State	W 69–68	2–1	29 – Tucker	9 – Oliva Fernandez	5 – Tucker	Hornets Nest (411); Sacramento, CA
November 22, 2024*; 4:00 p.m., ESPN+		at Toledo	L 72–79	2–2	17 – Chung	7 – Jones-Brown	3 – 2 tied	Savage Arena (4,046); Toledo, OH
November 24, 2024*; 11:00 a.m., B1G+		at Michigan	L 56–111	2–3	12 – Sonnier	6 – Chung	3 – Chung	Crisler Center (2,753); Ann Arbor, MI
December 1, 2024*; 2:00 p.m., ESPN+		Pepperdine	W 68–61	3–3	15 – 2 tied	14 – Loobie	3 – 3 tied	Walter Pyramid (620); Long Beach, CA
December 5, 2024; 6:00 p.m., ESPN+		Cal State Fullerton	W 67–56	4–3 (1–0)	16 – Tucker	12 – Crawshaw	4 – 2 tied	Walter Pyramid (779); Long Beach, CA
December 7, 2024; 9:00 p.m., ESPN+		at Hawaii	W 73–69 ^{OT}	5–3 (2–0)	23 – Tucker	12 – Loobie	5 – Chung	Stan Sheriff Center (1,762); Honolulu, HI
December 14, 2024*; 2:00 p.m., ESPN+		No. 1 UCLA	L 51–102	5–4	19 – Crawshaw	4 – 3 tied	6 – Tucker	Walter Pyramid (2,463); Long Beach, CA
December 19, 2024*; 1:00 p.m., ESPN+		Elon	L 67–68	5–5	17 – Jones-Brown	7 – 2 tied	6 – Chung	Walter Pyramid (718); Long Beach, CA
December 30, 2024*; 2:00 p.m., ESPN+		Bethesda	W 122–49	6–5	21 – Richards	12 – 2 tied	6 – Chung	Walter Pyramid (500); Long Beach, CA
January 2, 2025; 6:00 p.m., ESPN+		at UC Riverside	W 63–48	7–5 (3–0)	22 – Tucker	9 – Loobie	3 – 2 tied	SRC Arena (136); Riverside, CA
January 4, 2025; 2:00 p.m., ESPN+		Cal State Bakersfield	W 58–43	8–5 (4–0)	16 – Crawshaw	10 – Jones-Brown	1 – 7 tied	Walter Pyramid (579); Long Beach, CA
January 11, 2025; 2:00 p.m., ESPN+		UC Davis	W 73–60	9–5 (5–0)	22 – Tucker	7 – 2 tied	4 – Sonnier	Walter Pyramid (754); Long Beach, CA
January 16, 2025; 7:00 p.m., ESPN+		at UC San Diego	L 68–79	9–6 (5–1)	26 – Tucker	8 – Loobie	4 – Crawshaw	LionTree Arena (1,982); La Jolla, CA
January 18, 2025; 2:00 p.m., ESPN+		at Cal State Fullerton	W 72–60	10–6 (6–1)	20 – Crawshaw	12 – Loobie	4 – 2 tied	Titan Gym (193); Fullerton, CA
January 23, 2025; 6:00 p.m., ESPN+		Cal State Northridge	W 88–75	11–6 (7–1)	24 – Tucker	12 – Crawshaw	3 – 2 tied	The Gold Mine (620); Long Beach, CA
January 25, 2025; 1:00 p.m., ESPN+/SSN		Cal Poly	L 71–78	11–7 (7–2)	13 – Loobie	9 – Loobie	6 – Jones-Brown	The Gold Mine (606); Long Beach, CA
January 30, 2025; 6:00 p.m., ESPN+		at UC Irvine	L 47–61	11–8 (7–3)	13 – Crawshaw	11 – Crawshaw	5 – Crawshaw	Bren Events Center (672); Irvine, CA
February 1, 2025; 2:00 p.m., ESPN+		UC Santa Barbara	L 68–77	11–9 (7–4)	27 – Tucker	14 – Lobbie	6 – Chung	Walter Pyramid (1,112); Long Beach, CA
February 6, 2025; 6:00 p.m., ESPN+		at UC Davis	L 57–71	11–10 (7–5)	26 – Tucker	15 – Loobie	3 – Chung	University Credit Union Center (433); Davis, CA
February 8, 2025; 2:00 p.m., ESPN+		at Cal State Northridge	W 88–65	12–10 (8–5)	33 – Tucker	12 – Loobie	4 – Chung	Premier America Credit Union Arena (200); Northridge, CA
February 13, 2025; 6:00 p.m., ESPN+		Hawaii	L 65–72	12–11 (8–6)	19 – Tucker	6 – Crawshaw	4 – Crawshaw	Walter Pyramid (591); Long Beach, CA
February 20, 2025; 6:00 p.m., ESPN+		UC Riverside	W 75–69	13–11 (9–6)	19 – Tucker	8 – Loobie	4 – Crawshaw	Walter Pyramid (629); Long Beach, CA
February 22, 2025; 4:00 p.m., ESPN+		at UC Santa Barbara	L 58–73	13–12 (9–7)	17 – Tucker	11 – Loobie	3 – Jones-Brown	The Thunderdome (965); Santa Barbara, CA
February 27, 2025; 6:30 p.m., ESPN+		at Cal State Bakersfield	W 82–70	14–12 (10–7)	19 – Tucker	10 – Loobie	5 – Chung	Icardo Center (304); Bakersfield, CA
March 1, 2025; 1:00 p.m., ESPN+/SSN		UC Irvine	W 73–52	15–12 (11–7)	21 – Chung	18 – Loobie	5 – Chung	Walter Pyramid (958); Long Beach, CA
March 6, 2025; 6:00 p.m., ESPN+		UC San Diego	L 51–82	15–13 (11–8)	16 – Crawshaw	8 – Jones-Brown	7 – Chung	Walter Pyramid (623); Long Beach, CA
March 8, 2025; 2:00 p.m., ESPN+		at Cal Poly	W 72–64	16–13 (12–8)	18 – 2 tied	10 – Loobie	3 – 2 tied	Mott Athletics Center (773); San Luis Obispo, CA
Big West tournament
March 12, 2025; 2:30 p.m., ESPN+	(6)	vs. (7) UC Riverside; First round	L 40–54	16–14	8 – Loobie	12 – Loobie	2 – Tucker	Lee's Family Forum (882); Henderson, NV
*Non-conference game. ^{#}Rankings from AP poll. (#) Tournament seedings in parentheses. All times are in Pacific.
