= 2024–25 UC Davis Aggies women's basketball team =

American college basketball season

2024–25 UC Davis Aggies women's basketball
- Conference: Big West Conference
- Record: 21-12 (13-7 Big West)
- Head coach: Jennifer Gross (14th season)
- Associate head coach: Joe Teramoto
- Assistant coaches: Matt Klemin; Vicki Baugh; Mia Gallo; Dejza James
- Home arena: University Credit Union Center

2024–25 Big West women's basketball standings
	Conf.				Overall
Team	W		L	PCT	W		L	PCT
Hawai'i	16	–	4	.800	22	–	10	.688
UC Irvine	15	–	5	.750	21	–	10	.677
UC Davis	13	–	7	.650	21	–	12	.636
UC San Diego †	13	–	7	.650	20	–	16	.556
UC Santa Barbara	12	–	8	.600	18	–	13	.581
Long Beach State	12	–	8	.600	16	–	14	.533
UC Riverside	12	–	8	.600	17	–	15	.531
Cal Poly	8	–	12	.400	14	–	18	.438
Cal State Fullerton	5	–	15	.250	7	–	23	.233
Cal State Bakersfield	2	–	18	.100	2	–	28	.067
Cal State Northridge	2	–	18	.100	4	–	25	.138
† 2025 Big West tournament winner

The 2024–25 UC Davis Aggies women's basketball team represented the University of California, Davis during the 2024–25 NCAA Division I women's basketball season. The Aggies, led by 14th-year head coach Jennifer Gross, played their home games at the University Credit Union Center in Davis, California as members of the Big West Conference.

== Previous season ==
The Aggies finished the 2023–24 season 20–14, 13–7 in Big West play to finish in a three-way tie for third place. They defeated Cal State Fullerton, Cal Poly, and upset top-seeded Hawai'i, before falling to UC Irvine in the Big West tournament championship game.

== Roster ==
2024–25 UC Davis Aggies women's basketball team
Players
Coaches

Pos.	#	Name	Height	Year	Previous school	Hometown
G	2	Ryann Bennett	5 ft 8 in (1.73 m)	Fr	St. Anthony High School	Long Beach, California
G	3	Sahana Kanagasabay	5 ft 11 in (1.8 m)	RS Fr	Providence	Surrey, British Columbia
G	4	Nya Epps	5 ft 10 in (1.78 m)	Jr	Carondelet High School	El Cerrito, California
F	5	Ally Fitzgerald	6 ft 2 in (1.88 m)	Jr	Colorado	St. Louis, Missouri
G	9	Avery Sussex	5 ft 8 in (1.73 m)	Fr	Riverside Secondary School	Coquitlam, British Columbia
G	11	Clara Glad	6 ft 0 in (1.83 m)	So	Rogers High School	Rogers, Minnesota
G	13	Sydney Burns	5 ft 9 in (1.75 m)	Sr	Wilsonville High School	Wilsonville, Oregon
G	14	Tova Sabel	5 ft 11 in (1.8 m)	Sr	Penn State	Stockholm, Sweden
F	21	Theoni Tsami	6 ft 1 in (1.85 m)	RS Fr	Kronos Agiou Dimitriou	Athens, Greece
G	23	Victoria Baker	5 ft 9 in (1.75 m)	RS Jr	UC Irvine	Austin, Texas
C	25	Megan Norris	6 ft 3 in (1.91 m)	RS Jr	Sacred Heart Prep	Menlo Park, California
F	33	Mazatlan Harris	6 ft 2 in (1.88 m)	Sr	Cathedral Catholic High School	San Diego, California
G	41	Bria Shine	6 ft 1 in (1.85 m)	Sr	Christian Brothers High School	Sacramento, California

Head coach

- Jennifer Gross (UC Davis)

Assistant coach(es)

- Joe Teramoto (Cal Poly)
- Matt Klemin (Cal Poly)
- Vicki Baugh (Tennessee)
- Mia Gallo (Cal State Fullerton)
- Dejza James (Arizona)

Legend

- (C) Team captain
- (S) Suspended
- (I) Ineligible
- (W) Walk-on
- Injured
- Current redshirt

Roster
Last update: January 21, 2025

== Schedule and results ==
Date time, TV	Rank^{#}	Opponent^{#}	Result	Record	High points	High rebounds	High assists	Site (attendance) city, state
Exhibition
October 27, 2024*; 2:00 pm		Stanislaus State	W 105–46	–	18 – Harris	10 – Sabel	6 – Burns	University Credit Union Center; Davis, CA
Regular season
November 4, 2024*; 6:00 pm, ESPN+		Simpson	W 93–36	1–0	18 – Sabel	6 – Tied	6 – Burns	University Credit Union Center (390); Davis, CA
November 8, 2024*; 5:00 pm, ESPN+		San Diego State	L 77–83 ^{OT}	1–1	26 – Tied	8 – Sabel	5 – Harris	University Credit Union Center (712); Davis, CA
November 13, 2024*; 7:00 pm, ACCNX		at No. 24 Stanford	L 56–69	1–2	17 – Harris	5 – Tied	2 – Tied	Maples Pavilion (2,499); Stanford, CA
November 17, 2024*; 1:00 pm, ESPN+		at Montana State	L 59–77	1–3	14 – Epps	8 – Norris	4 – Baker	Worthington Arena (1,457); Bozeman, MT
November 20, 2024*; 6:00 pm, ESPN+		Sacramento State	W 76–45	2–3	21 – Norris	9 – Sabel	3 – Tied	University Credit Union Center (783); Davis, CA
November 24, 2024*; 2:00 pm, ESPN+		at Santa Clara	W 74–70 ^{OT}	3–3	30 – Norris	7 – Norris	3 – Sussex	Leavey Center (237); Santa Clara, CA
November 30, 2024*; 2:00 pm, ESPN+		at Portland State	L 61–66	3–4	17 – Sabel	11 – Sabel	7 – Burns	Viking Pavilion (373); Portland, OR
December 5, 2024; 6:00 pm, ESPN+		at Cal Poly	W 66–60	4–4 (1–0)	20 – Sabel	6 – Norris	3 – Tied	Mott Athletics Center (518); San Luis Obispo, CA
December 7, 2024; 4:00 pm, ESPN+		at UC Santa Barbara	W 72–50	5–4 (2–0)	13 – Sabel	9 – Norris	5 – Epps	The Thunderdome (450); Santa Barbara, CA
December 15, 2024*; 2:00 pm, ESPN+		Arizona State	W 57–50	6–4	13 – Sabel	9 – Sabel	3 – Burns	University Credit Union Center (521); Davis, CA
December 18, 2024*; 11:00 am, ESPN+		at Idaho	W 65–58	7–4	19 – Norris	15 – Norris	2 – Tied	ICCU Arena (2,024); Moscow, ID
December 28, 2024*; 1:00 pm, ESPN+		Cal Maritime	W 115–29	8–4	15 – Norris	8 – Burns	6 – Tied	University Credit Union Center (823); Davis, CA
January 2, 2025; 6:00 pm, ESPN+		Cal State Bakersfield	W 81–37	9–4 (3–0)	21 – Sabel	8 – Shine	4 – Norris	University Credit Union Center (412); Davis, CA
January 4, 2025; 2:00 pm, ESPN+		Cal State Northridge	W 68–41	10–4 (4–0)	10 – Tied	11 – Norris	3 – Tied	University Credit Union Center (732); Davis, CA
January 9, 2025; 7:00 pm, ESPN+		at Cal State Fullerton	W 80–54	11–4 (5–0)	24 – Sabel	11 – Norris	4 – Tied	Titan Gym (153); Fullerton, CA
January 11, 2025; 2:00 pm, ESPN+		at Long Beach State	L 60–73	11–5 (5–1)	13 – Harris	7 – Harris	3 – Tied	Walter Pyramid (754); Long Beach, CA
January 16, 2025; 6:00 pm, ESPN+		Cal Poly	W 63–51	12–5 (6–1)	17 – Norris	10 – Sabel	4 – Epps	University Credit Union Center (692); Davis, CA
January 18, 2025; 2:00 pm, ESPN+		UC Santa Barbara	L 50–63	12–6 (6–2)	11 – Sabel	9 – Norris	2 – Burns	University Credit Union Center (816); Davis, CA
January 23, 2025; 10:00 pm, ESPN+		at Hawai'i	L 46-56	12-7 (6-3)	11 – Sabel	6 – Sabel	2 – Norris	Stan Sheriff Center (1,652); Honolulu, HI
January 30, 2025; 6:00 pm, ESPN+		UC Riverside	W 52-41	13-7 (7-3)	11 – Sabel	12 – Norris	2 – Norris	University Credit Union Center (515); Davis, CA
February 1, 2025; 2:00 pm, ESPN+		UC Irvine	L 49-52	13-8 (7-4)	16 – Norris	9 – Norris	4 – Harris	University Credit Union Center (867); Davis, CA
February 6, 2025; 6:00 pm, ESPN+		Long Beach State	W 71-57	14-8 (8-4)	24 – Epps	10 – Sabel	6 – Burns	University Credit Union Center (433); Davis, CA
February 8, 2025; 2:00 pm, ESPN+		Cal State Fullerton	W 71–54	15-8 (9-4)	21 – Norris	7 – Norris	4 – Burns	University Credit Union Center (907); Davis, CA
February 13, 2025; 5:00 pm, ESPN+		at UC Riverside	L 53–55	15-9 (9-5)	16 – Sabel	10 – Sabel	5 – Burns	SRC Arena (103); Riverside, CA
February 15, 2025; 2:00 pm, ESPN+		UC San Diego	L 63–65	15-10 (9-6)	25 – Sabel	14 – Sabel	5 – Bennett	University Credit Union Center (702); Davis, CA
February 20, 2025; 6:30 pm, ESPN+		at Cal State Bakersfield	W 66–45	16-10 (10-6)	24 – Sabel	9 – Norris	3 – Sabel	Icardo Center (399); Bakersfield, CA
February 22, 2025; 2:00 pm, ESPN+		at Cal State Northridge	W 66–45	17-10 (11-6)	15 – Epps	6 – Baker	5 – Burns	Premier America Credit Union Arena (220); Northridge, CA
March 1, 2025; 2:00 pm, ESPN+		Hawai'i	W 74–66	18-10 (12-6)	18 – Sabel	6 – Norris	4 – Burns	University Credit Union Center (1,198); Davis, CA
March 6, 2025; 6:00 pm, ESPN+		at UC Irvine	L 53–55	18-11 (12-7)	15 – Norris	9 – Harris	3 – Bennett	Bren Events Center (679); Irvine, CA
March 8, 2025; 2:00 pm, ESPN+		at UC San Diego	W 69–58	19-11 (13-7)	19 – Bennett	7 – Harris	5 – Burns	LionTree Arena (472); La Jolla, CA
Big West tournament
March 13, 2025; 2:30 pm, ESPN+	(3)	vs. (7) UC Riverside; Quarterfinal	W 61–50	20-11	20 – Sabel	7 – Harris	9 – Bennett	Lee's Family Forum (892); Henderson, NV
March 14, 2025; 2:30 pm, ESPN+	(3)	vs. (2) UC Irvine; Semifinal	W 63–56	21-11	21 – Sabel	10 – Norris	4 – Burns	Lee's Family Forum (1,627); Henderson, NV
March 15, 2025; 2:30 pm, ESPN+	(3)	vs. (4) UC San Diego; Championship	L 66–75	21-12	13 – Tied	7 – Norris	4 – Norris	Lee's Family Forum; Henderson, NV
*Non-conference game. ^{#}Rankings from AP Poll. (#) Tournament seedings in parentheses. All times are in Pacific.
