= 2024–25 Cal State Northridge Matadors women's basketball team =

American college basketball season

2024–25 Cal State Northridge Matadors women's basketball
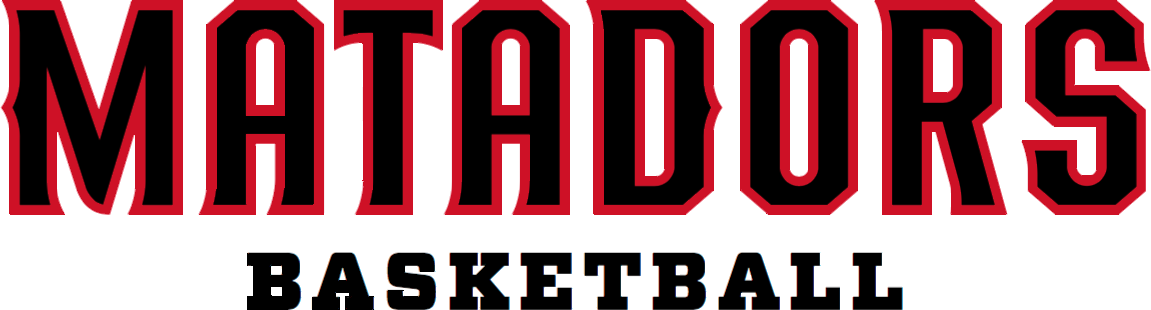
- Conference: Big West Conference
- Record: 4–25 (2–18 Big West)
- Head coach: Angie Ned (1st season)
- Assistant coaches: Nate Fripp; Akilah Martin; Tori Mitchell
- Home arena: Premier America Credit Union Arena

2024–25 Big West women's basketball standings
	Conf.				Overall
Team	W		L	PCT	W		L	PCT
Hawai'i	16	–	4	.800	22	–	10	.688
UC Irvine	15	–	5	.750	21	–	10	.677
UC Davis	13	–	7	.650	21	–	12	.636
UC San Diego †	13	–	7	.650	20	–	16	.556
UC Santa Barbara	12	–	8	.600	18	–	13	.581
Long Beach State	12	–	8	.600	16	–	14	.533
UC Riverside	12	–	8	.600	17	–	15	.531
Cal Poly	8	–	12	.400	14	–	18	.438
Cal State Fullerton	5	–	15	.250	7	–	23	.233
Cal State Bakersfield	2	–	18	.100	2	–	28	.067
Cal State Northridge	2	–	18	.100	4	–	25	.138
† 2025 Big West tournament winner

The 2024–25 Cal State Northridge Matadors women's basketball team represented California State University, Northridge during the 2024–25 NCAA Division I women's basketball season. The Matadors, led by first-year head coach Angie Ned, played their home games at the Premier America Credit Union Arena in Northridge, California as members of the Big West Conference.

The Matadors finished the season 4–25, 2–18 in Big West play, to finish in eleventh (last) place.

== Previous season ==
The Matadors finished the 2023–24 season 3–27, 1–19 in Big West play, to finish in last place. Since only the top eight teams in the conference participate, the Matadors failed to qualify for the Big West tournament.

On March 15, 2024, the school announced the firing of head coach Carlene Mitchell, ending her three-year tenure with the team. On April 29, the school announced that California Baptist associate head coach Angie Ned would be named the Matadors' new head coach.

== Roster ==
2024–25 Cal State Northridge Matadors women's basketball team
Players
Coaches

Pos.	#	Name	Height	Year	Previous school	Hometown
G	0	Jenna Kilty	5 ft 10 in (1.78 m)	GS	Idaho	Oakland, CA
G	2	Kayla Hopson	5 ft 8 in (1.73 m)	Fr	South Shore High School	The Bronx, NY
G	3	Kelly Tumlin	5 ft 9 in (1.75 m)	Jr	Chabot College	San Ramon, CA
G	4	Morgan Edwards	5 ft 7 in (1.7 m)	Jr	Cal State Bakersfield	Los Angeles, CA
C	5	Yves Cox	6 ft 2 in (1.88 m)	Fr	Link Academy	Savannah, TX
F	10	Alondra Lizama	5 ft 10 in (1.78 m)	So	Bishop Alemany High School	North Hollywood, CA
F	14	Nnenna Orji	6 ft 2 in (1.88 m)	GS	Old Dominion	Rancho Cucamonga, CA
G	20	Erica Adams	5 ft 10 in (1.78 m)	Sr	Pacific	Oakland, CA
G	21	Karsen Marshall	5 ft 8 in (1.73 m)	Fr	Ontario Christian High School	Wildomar, CA
G	22	Laini Dahlin	5 ft 10 in (1.78 m)	Jr	Eastern Arizona College	Central Point, OR
C	23	Sincere Hardwick	6 ft 1 in (1.85 m)	So	Saint Katherine	Moreno Valley, CA
F	24	Kylie Robertson	6 ft 0 in (1.83 m)	Fr	Tahoma High School	Maple Valley, WA
G	25	Erika Aspajo	5 ft 5 in (1.65 m)	Jr	Georgian Court	Barcelona, Spain

Head coach

- Angie Ned (UC Irvine)

Assistant coach(es)

- Nate Fripp (BYU–Hawaii)
- Akilah Martin (UC Riverside)
- Tori Mitchell (Cal Baptist)

Legend

- (C) Team captain
- (S) Suspended
- (I) Ineligible
- (W) Walk-on
- Injured
- Current redshirt

Roster
Last update: January 24, 2025

== Schedule and results ==
Date time, TV	Rank^{#}	Opponent^{#}	Result	Record	High points	High rebounds	High assists	Site (attendance) city, state
Regular season
November 4, 2024*; 6:00 p.m., ESPN+		La Sierra	W 70–56	1–0	12 – Adams	10 – Adams	5 – Adams	Premier America Credit Union Arena (225); Northridge, CA
November 8, 2024*; 5:00 p.m., MWN		at Utah State	W 69–65	2–0	19 – Cox	11 – Cox	8 – Aspajo	Smith Spectrum (670); Logan, UT
November 12, 2024*; 7:00 p.m., B1G+		at No. 3 USC	L 39–124	2–1	11 – Dahlin	4 – Aspajo	4 – Aspajo	Galen Center (3,064); Los Angeles, CA
November 22, 2024*; 6:00 p.m., MWN		at Fresno State	L 73–90	2–2	14 – Aspajo	5 – Cox	4 – Aspajo	Save Mart Center (907); Fresno, CA
November 24, 2024*; 2:00 p.m., MWN		at San Jose State	L 44–62	2–3	11 – Edwards	5 – 2 tied	2 – 4 tied	Provident Credit Union Event Center (514); San Jose, CA
November 27, 2024*; 2:00 p.m., ESPN+		Pepperdine	L 58–84	2–4	10 – 2 tied	7 – Adams	7 – Adams	Premier America Credit Union Arena (500); Northridge, CA
December 5, 2024; 6:00 p.m., ESPN+		at UC Riverside	L 48–72	2–5 (0–1)	14 – Edwards	6 – Adams	3 – 2 tied	SRC Arena (275); Riverside, CA
December 7, 2024; 2:00 p.m., ESPN+		Cal Poly	L 45–58	2–6 (0–2)	11 – 2 tied	8 – Cox	4 – Hopson	Premier America Credit Union Arena (330); Northridge, CA
December 11, 2024*; 6:00 p.m., ESPN+		California Baptist	L 71–73	2–7	22 – Edwards	6 – 3 tied	5 – Tumlin	Premier America Credit Union Arena (250); Northridge, CA
December 14, 2024*; 2:00 p.m., ESPN+		at San Diego	L 52–74	2–8	15 – Adams	7 – Cox	3 – 2 tied	Jenny Craig Pavilion (1,331); San Diego, CA
December 21, 2024*; 2:30 p.m., ESPN+		Idaho	L 52–68	2–9	16 – Tumlin	10 – Aspajo	9 – Aspajo	Premier America Credit Union Arena (275); Northridge, CA
January 2, 2025; 6:00 p.m., ESPN+		Cal State Fullerton	W 79–76 ^{OT}	3–9 (1–2)	21 – Edwards	14 – Cox	8 – Aspajo	Premier America Credit Union Arena (200); Northridge, CA
January 4, 2025; 2:00 p.m., ESPN+		at UC Davis	L 41–68	3–10 (1–3)	12 – Kilty	7 – 2 tied	3 – Aspajo	University Credit Union Center (732); Davis, CA
January 9, 2025; 6:00 p.m., ESPN+		at UC Irvine	L 39–68	3–11 (1–4)	11 – Edwards	4 – 2 tied	8 – Aspajo	Bren Events Center (632); Irvine, CA
January 11, 2025; 2:00 p.m., ESPN+		Cal State Bakersfield	L 56–62	3–12 (1–5)	22 – Aspajo	10 – Cox	4 – Aspajo	Premier America Credit Union Arena (200); Northridge, CA
January 16, 2025; 6:00 p.m., ESPN+		Hawaii	L 47–75	3–13 (1–6)	14 – Aspajo	6 – 2 tied	5 – Aspajo	Premier America Credit Union Arena (160); Northridge, CA
January 23, 2025; 6:00 p.m., ESPN+		at Long Beach State	L 75–88	3–14 (1–7)	13 – 2 tied	9 – Orji	3 – Aspajo	Gold Mine (620); Long Beach, CA
January 25, 2025; 2:00 p.m., ESPN+		UC San Diego	L 44–82	3–15 (1–8)	11 – Orji	9 – Orji	2 – Aspajo	Premier America Credit Union Arena (250); Northridge, CA
January 30, 2025; 11:00 a.m., ESPN+		UC Santa Barbara	L 53–68	3–16 (1–9)	16 – Orji	7 – Adams	5 – Aspajo	Premier America Credit Union Arena (1,704); Northridge, CA
February 1, 2025; 2:00 p.m., ESPN+		at Cal State Bakersfield	W 65–51	4–16 (2–9)	19 – Tumlin	7 – Orji	3 – 2 tied	Icardo Center (322); Bakersfield, CA
February 6, 2025; 7:00 p.m., ESPN+		at Cal State Fullerton	L 61–65	4–17 (2–10)	21 – Tumlin	8 – 3 tied	6 – Hopson	Titan Gym (96); Fullerton, CA
February 8, 2025; 2:00 p.m., ESPN+		Long Beach State	L 65–88	4–18 (2–11)	14 – 2 tied	13 – Lizama	8 – Hopson	Premier America Credit Union Arena (200); Northridge, CA
February 15, 2025; 2:00 p.m., ESPN+		at Cal Poly	L 34–75	4–19 (2–12)	17 – Edwards	7 – Dahlin	3 – Adams	Mott Athletics Center (443); San Luis Obispo, CA
February 20, 2025; 6:00 p.m., ESPN+		UC Irvine	L 56–100	4–20 (2–13)	11 – Edwards	11 – Cox	4 – Aspajo	Premier America Credit Union Arena (270); Northridge, CA
February 22, 2025; 2:00 p.m., ESPN+		UC Davis	L 45–66	4–21 (2–14)	11 – Orji	10 – 2 tied	6 – Aspajo	Premier America Credit Union Arena (220); Northridge, CA
February 27, 2025; 7:00 p.m., ESPN+		at UC San Diego	L 64–78	4–22 (2–15)	12 – Edwards	8 – Hopson	5 – Hopson	LionTree Arena (300); La Jolla, CA
March 1, 2025; 4:00 p.m., ESPN+		at UC Santa Barbara	L 52–74	4–23 (2–16)	14 – Orji	7 – Tumlin	5 – Aspajo	The Thunderdome (594); Santa Barbara, CA
March 6, 2025; 6:00 p.m., ESPN+		UC Riverside	L 74–77	4–24 (2–17)	22 – Orji	8 – 2 tied	7 – Aspajo	Premier America Credit Union Arena (270); Northridge, CA
March 8, 2025; 9:00 p.m., ESPN+		at Hawaii	L 36–62	4–25 (2–18)	15 – Orji	12 – Adams	4 – Aspajo	Stan Sheriff Center (3,579); Honolulu, HI
*Non-conference game. ^{#}Rankings from AP poll. (#) Tournament seedings in parentheses. All times are in Pacific.
