= 2024–25 Cal State Bakersfield Roadrunners women's basketball team =

American college basketball season

2024–25 Cal State Bakersfield Roadrunners women's basketball
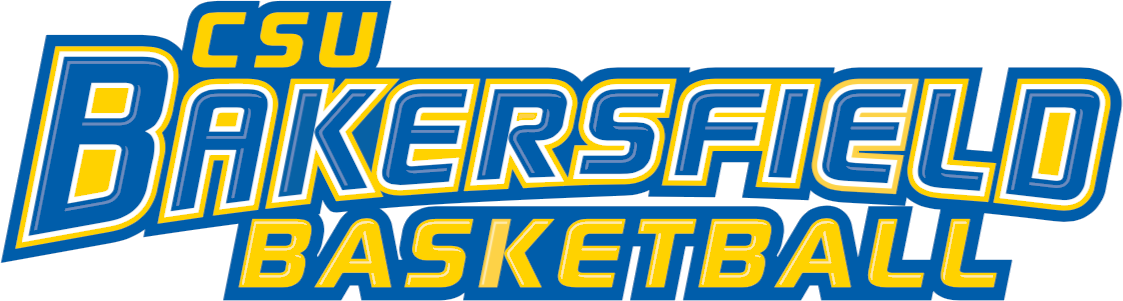
- Conference: Big West Conference
- Record: 2–28 (2–18 Big West)
- Head coach: Ari Wideman (1st season)
- Associate head coach: Aaron A. Swinson
- Assistant coaches: Advit Raghavan; Me'a Hafoka-Latu; Jason Hardy
- Home arena: Icardo Center

2024–25 Big West women's basketball standings
	Conf.				Overall
Team	W		L	PCT	W		L	PCT
Hawai'i	16	–	4	.800	22	–	10	.688
UC Irvine	15	–	5	.750	21	–	10	.677
UC Davis	13	–	7	.650	21	–	12	.636
UC San Diego †	13	–	7	.650	20	–	16	.556
UC Santa Barbara	12	–	8	.600	18	–	13	.581
Long Beach State	12	–	8	.600	16	–	14	.533
UC Riverside	12	–	8	.600	17	–	15	.531
Cal Poly	8	–	12	.400	14	–	18	.438
Cal State Fullerton	5	–	15	.250	7	–	23	.233
Cal State Bakersfield	2	–	18	.100	2	–	28	.067
Cal State Northridge	2	–	18	.100	4	–	25	.138
† 2025 Big West tournament winner

The 2024–25 Cal State Bakersfield Roadrunners women's basketball team represented California State University, Bakersfield during the 2024–25 NCAA Division I women's basketball season. The Roadrunners, led by first-year head coach Ari Wideman, played their home games at the Icardo Center in Bakersfield, California as members of the Big West Conference.

They finished the season 2–28, 2–18 in Big West play, to finish in a tie for tenth place.

== Previous season ==
The Roadrunners finished the 2023–24 season 8–21, 5–15 in Big West play, to finish in tenth place. Since only the top eight teams in the conference participate, the Roadrunners failed to qualify for the Big West tournament.

On March 12, 2024, the school announced that they would not be retaining head coach Greg McCall, ending his 13-year tenure with the Roadrunners. On May 3, the school announced the hiring of Toledo assistant coach Ari Wideman as the team's new head coach, becoming the first black female head coach in program history.

== Roster ==
2024–25 Cal State Bakersfield Roadrunners women's basketball team
Players
Coaches

Pos.	#	Name	Height	Year	Previous school	Hometown
G	2	Caitie Gingras	5 ft 9 in (1.75 m)	RS Fr	Edge Prep School	Vernon, BC
F	4	Ary Dizon	6 ft 1 in (1.85 m)	RS Sr	Vermont	Tampa, FL
G	5	Nseije Ortiz	5 ft 6 in (1.68 m)	Jr	Porterville High School	Porterville, CA
G/F	8	Marley Langi	6 ft 0 in (1.83 m)	Jr	Skyline College	Redwood City, CA
G	11	Taylor Caldwell	5 ft 9 in (1.75 m)	GS	Grand Canyon	Bakersfield, CA
G	13	Bryanne Lopez-Wood	5 ft 8 in (1.73 m)	Fr	Village Christian School	Sylmar, CA
G	20	Melissa Secchiaroli	5 ft 9 in (1.75 m)	Sr	Morehead State	Sorgues, France
G	21	Dylan Tse	5 ft 7 in (1.7 m)	Fr	Pasadena High School	Pasadena, CA
F	23	Ileana Feliz	6 ft 1 in (1.85 m)	Fr	New Milford High School	New Milford, CT
G	30	Alli Dioli	5 ft 9 in (1.75 m)	So	Mission College	Half Moon Bay, CA
F	32	Garrisen Freeman	5 ft 10 in (1.78 m)	RS Jr	Spring Valley High School	Las Vegas, NV
F	34	Cheyenne Forney	6 ft 3 in (1.91 m)	GS	Arkansas State	Fontana, CA
G	42	Allysan Tse	5 ft 8 in (1.73 m)	Jr	Cal State Fullerton	South Pasadena, CA
G	55	Trinity Slocum	5 ft 8 in (1.73 m)	RS Jr	Stephen F. Austin	Boise, ID
G		Ophelia Powell	5 ft 9 in (1.75 m)	Fr	St Andrew's College (NZ)	Melbourne, Australia

Head coach

- Ari Wideman (Nevada)

Assistant coach(es)

- Aaron A. Swinson (Auburn)
- Advit Raghavan (Puget Sound)
- Me'a Hafoka-Latu (San José State)
- Jason Hardy (Idaho)

Legend

- (C) Team captain
- (S) Suspended
- (I) Ineligible
- (W) Walk-on
- Injured
- Current redshirt

Roster
Last update: January 24, 2025

== Schedule and results ==
Date time, TV	Rank^{#}	Opponent^{#}	Result	Record	High points	High rebounds	High assists	Site (attendance) city, state
Exhibition
October 28, 2024*; 6:30 p.m.		Hawaii Pacific	W 52–39	–	–	–	–	Icardo Center; Bakersfield, CA
Regular season
November 4, 2024*; 3:00 p.m., ESPN+		at Grand Canyon	L 52–93	0–1	12 – Caldwell	6 – A. Tse	4 – Dizon	Global Credit Union Arena (552); Phoenix, AZ
November 8, 2024*; 11:00 a.m., ESPN+		Colgate	L 42–71	0–2	9 – Dizon	7 – 2 tied	2 – 2 tied	Icardo Center (1,326); Bakersfield, CA
November 14, 2024*; 10:00 a.m., ESPN+		at Utah State	L 51–67	0–3	15 – Secchiaroli	6 – 2 tied	4 – Slocum	Smith Spectrum (3,450); Logan, UT
November 16, 2024*; 1:00 p.m., ESPN+		at Utah Valley	L 48–72	0–4	11 – Dioli	8 – Slocum	4 – Slocum	UCCU Center (457); Orem, UT
November 22, 2024*; 6:00 p.m., ESPN+		San Diego State	L 46–88	0–5	8 – Forney	5 – Dioli	2 – Caldwell	Icardo Center (295); Bakersfield, CA
November 27, 2024*; 6:00 p.m., ESPN+		at Eastern Washington	L 58–67	0–6	14 – Gingras	8 – 2 tied	4 – Dioli	Reese Court (503); Cheney, WA
December 5, 2024; 6:30 p.m., ESPN+		UC Irvine	L 40–65	0–7 (0–1)	9 – 2 tied	6 – 2 tied	2 – 4 tied	Icardo Center (320); Bakersfield, CA
December 7, 2024; 2:00 p.m., ESPN+		UC San Diego	L 40–55	0–8 (0–2)	16 – Dioli	11 – Caldwell	3 – Caldwell	Icardo Center (239); Bakersfield, CA
December 10, 2024*; 5:00 p.m., ESPN+		at Arizona	L 39–76	0–9	16 – Langi	6 – Langi	4 – Caldwell	McKale Center (6,313); Tucson, AZ
December 14, 2024*; 1:00 p.m., MWN		at Fresno State	L 46–65	0–10	20 – Forney	10 – Forney	2 – 2 tied	Save Mart Center (964); Fresno, CA
December 18, 2024*; 2:00 p.m., ESPN+		Wichita State	L 69–100	0–11	16 – Dioli	7 – Forney	3 – Caldwell	Icardo Center (171); Bakersfield, CA
December 29, 2024*; 2:00 p.m., ESPN+		Seattle	L 49–58	0–12	17 – Dizon	9 – Caldwell	4 – Secchiaroli	Icardo Center (307); Bakersfield, CA
January 2, 2025; 6:00 p.m., ESPN+		at UC Davis	L 37–81	0–13 (0–3)	9 – 2 tied	8 – Langi	3 – D. Tse	University Credit Union Center (412); Davis, CA
January 4, 2025; 2:00 p.m., ESPN+		at Long Beach State	L 43–58	0–14 (0–4)	12 – Gingras	10 – Dizon	2 – Dizon	Walter Pyramid (579); Long Beach, CA
January 9, 2025; 6:30 p.m., ESPN+		UC Santa Barbara	L 57–61	0–15 (0–5)	14 – 2 tied	6 – 2 tied	3 – Caldwell	Icardo Center (269); Bakersfield, CA
January 11, 2025; 2:00 p.m., ESPN+		at Cal State Northridge	W 62–56	1–15 (1–5)	15 – Gingras	10 – Dizon	6 – Caldwell	Premier America Credit Union Arena (200); Northridge, CA
January 18, 2025; 2:00 p.m., ESPN+		Hawaii	L 37–66	1–16 (1–6)	11 – Langi	5 – Dizon	2 – 2 tied	Icardo Center (251); Bakersfield, CA
January 23, 2025; 6:30 p.m., ESPN+		Cal State Fullerton	L 58–63	1–17 (1–7)	22 – Dizon	9 – Dizon	4 – Slocum	Icardo Center (581); Bakersfield, CA
January 25, 2025; 4:00 p.m., ESPN+		at UC Riverside	L 48–60	1–18 (1–8)	11 – Slocum	6 – Dizon	3 – 2 tied	SRC Arena (175); Riverside, CA
January 30, 2025; 6:00 p.m., ESPN+		at Cal Poly	L 42–51	1–19 (1–9)	11 – Secchiaroli	7 – 2 tied	2 – Dizon	Mott Athletics Center (321); San Luis Obispo, CA
February 1, 2025; 2:00 p.m., ESPN+		Cal State Northridge	L 51–65	1–20 (1–10)	15 – Dizon	8 – Slocum	4 – Dizon	Icardo Center (322); Bakersfield, CA
February 6, 2025; 7:00 p.m., ESPN+		at UC Santa Barbara	L 40–51	1–21 (1–11)	13 – Secchiaroli	8 – Freeman	2 – 2 tied	The Thunderdome (478); Santa Barbara, CA
February 8, 2025; 2:00 p.m., ESPN+		UC Riverside	W 63–58	2–21 (2–11)	23 – Langi	7 – Caldwell	4 – 3 tied	Icardo Center (384); Bakersfield, CA
February 13, 2025; 7:00 p.m., ESPN+		at UC San Diego	L 45–63	2–22 (2–12)	14 – Dizon	7 – 2 tied	5 – Slocum	LionTree Arena (501); La Jolla, CA
February 15, 2025; 2:00 p.m., ESPN+		at Cal State Fullerton	L 68–78	2–23 (2–13)	22 – Dizon	9 – Dizon	3 – Dizon	Titan Gym (215); Fullerton, CA
February 20, 2025; 6:30 p.m., ESPN+		UC Davis	L 45–66	2–24 (2–14)	11 – 2 tied	6 – 3 tied	2 – Caldwell	Icardo Center (399); Bakersfield, CA
February 22, 2025; 2:00 p.m., ESPN+		at UC Irvine	L 49–60	2–25 (2–15)	14 – Dizon	11 – Dizon	5 – Caldwell	Bren Events Center (617); Irvine, CA
February 27, 2025; 6:30 p.m., ESPN+		Long Beach State	L 70–82	2–26 (2–16)	14 – Gingras	11 – Freeman	6 – Dizon	Icardo Center (304); Bakersfield, CA
March 1, 2025; 2:00 p.m., ESPN+		Cal Poly	L 51–57	2–27 (2–17)	14 – Secchiaroli	8 – Dizon	5 – Caldwell	Icardo Center (272); Bakersfield, CA
March 6, 2025; 9:00 p.m., ESPN+		at Hawaii	L 51–66	2–28 (2–18)	11 – Secchiaroli	6 – Dizon	4 – Caldwell	Stan Sheriff Center (1,886); Honolulu, HI
*Non-conference game. ^{#}Rankings from AP poll. (#) Tournament seedings in parentheses. All times are in Pacific.
