= Ari Wideman =

American college basketball player and coach

Biographical details
- Education: University of Nevada, Reno (B.A.); Prairie View A&M University (M.Ed.)

Playing career

College:
- 2010–2014: Nevada

Professional:
- 2014–2015: Breiðablik

Coaching career (HC unless noted)
- 2018–2022: San Jose State (assistant)
- 2022–2023: Arkansas State (assistant)
- 2023–2024: Toledo (assistant)
- 2024–2026: Cal State Bakersfield

Head coaching record
- Overall: 9–51 (.150)

Ari Wideman is an American basketball coach and former player who was the head coach of the Cal State Bakersfield Roadrunners women's basketball team.

== Coaching career ==
Wideman began her coaching career as a graduate assistant for the Prairie View A&M Lady Panthers basketball team.

On May 3, 2024, Wideman named the fourth women's basketball coach in California State University, Bakersfield history.

== Head coaching record ==
Record table
Season	Team	Overall	Conference	Standing	Postseason
Cal State Bakersfield Roadrunners (Big West) (2024–2026)
2024–25	Cal State Bakersfield	2–28	2–18	T-10th	
2025–26	Cal State Bakersfield	7–23	2–18	T-10th	
Cal State Bakersfield:		9–51 (.150)	4–36 (.100)		
Total:		9–51 (.150)			
National champion Postseason invitational champion Conference regular season champion Conference regular season and conference tournament champion Division regular season champion Division regular season and conference tournament champion Conference tournament champion
