= 2024–25 UC Riverside Highlanders women's basketball team =

American college basketball season

2024–25 UC Riverside Highlanders women's basketball
- Conference: Big West Conference
- Record: 17–15 (12–8 Big West)
- Head coach: Brad Langston (2nd season)
- Assistant coaches: Sean LeBeauf; Jewelyn Huth; Najé Murray; Natasha Smith
- Home arena: SRC Arena

2024–25 Big West women's basketball standings
	Conf.				Overall
Team	W		L	PCT	W		L	PCT
Hawai'i	16	–	4	.800	22	–	10	.688
UC Irvine	15	–	5	.750	21	–	10	.677
UC Davis	13	–	7	.650	21	–	12	.636
UC San Diego †	13	–	7	.650	20	–	16	.556
UC Santa Barbara	12	–	8	.600	18	–	13	.581
Long Beach State	12	–	8	.600	16	–	14	.533
UC Riverside	12	–	8	.600	17	–	15	.531
Cal Poly	8	–	12	.400	14	–	18	.438
Cal State Fullerton	5	–	15	.250	7	–	23	.233
Cal State Bakersfield	2	–	18	.100	2	–	28	.067
Cal State Northridge	2	–	18	.100	4	–	25	.138
† 2025 Big West tournament winner

The 2024–25 UC Riverside Highlanders women's basketball team represented the University of California, Riverside during the 2024–25 NCAA Division I women's basketball season. The Highlanders, led by second-year head coach Brad Langston, played their home games at the SRC Arena in Riverside, California as members of the Big West Conference.

== Previous season ==
The Highlanders finished the 2023–24 season 18–14, 13–7 in Big West play, to finish in a tie for third place. They were upset by Long Beach State in the quarterfinals of the Big West tournament. They received an at-large bid into the WNIT, where they fell to South Dakota in the first round.

== Roster ==
2024–25 UC Riverside Highlanders women's basketball team
Players
Coaches

Pos.	#	Name	Height	Year	Previous school	Hometown
G	0	Makayla Rose	5 ft 7 in (1.7 m)	Jr	Stanislaus State	Roseville, CA
G	1	Kaylani Polk	5 ft 8 in (1.73 m)	Fr	Paramount High School	Compton, CA
G	2	Seneca Hackley	5 ft 9 in (1.75 m)	GS	Northern Colorado	Colorado Springs, CO
G	3	Zoe Tillery	5 ft 8 in (1.73 m)	Jr	Laguna Creek High School	Sacramento, CA
G	4	Jordyn Marshall	5 ft 6 in (1.68 m)	Jr	Manvel High School	Pearland, TX
G	5	Shelley Duchemin	6 ft 0 in (1.83 m)	Jr	Northern Colorado	Culver City, CA
G	7	Hannah Wickstrom	5 ft 10 in (1.78 m)	Fr	Kilbreda College	Melbourne, Australia
G	10	Makayla Minshall	5 ft 8 in (1.73 m)	Fr	Westfields Sports High School	Sydney, Australia
F	11	Esther Matarranz	6 ft 2 in (1.88 m)	Sr	Perfumerías Avenida	Madrid, Spain
C	12	Gemma Cutler	6 ft 3 in (1.91 m)	GS	Simon Fraser	North Vancouver, BC
G/F	13	Maya Chocano	6 ft 1 in (1.85 m)	So	King's Christian Collegiate	Toronto, ON
F/C	30	Dieynaba Sylla	6 ft 2 in (1.88 m)	Jr	San Bernardino Valley College	Vanves, France
F	35	TT Hill-Brown	6 ft 2 in (1.88 m)	Jr	Utah State	Stockton, CA

Head coach

- Brad Langston (San José State)

Assistant coach(es)

- Sean LeBeauf (Montevallo)
- Jewelyn Huth (Long Beach State)
- Najé Murray (Syracuse)
- Natasha Smith (Chico State)

Legend

- (C) Team captain
- (S) Suspended
- (I) Ineligible
- (W) Walk-on
- Injured
- Current redshirt

Roster
Last update: January 24, 2025

== Schedule and results ==
Date time, TV	Rank^{#}	Opponent^{#}	Result	Record	High points	High rebounds	High assists	Site (attendance) city, state
Regular season
November 4, 2024*; 6:00 p.m., ESPN+		at Santa Clara	L 60–73	0–1	16 – Duchemin	7 – Matarranz	4 – 2 tied	Leavey Center (275); Santa Clara, CA
November 8, 2024*; 6:00 p.m., ESPN+		Whittier	W 84–45	1–1	17 – Wickstrom	6 – Matarranz	4 – Rose	SRC Arena (215); Riverside, CA
November 11, 2024*; 6:00 p.m.		at Fresno State	L 53–63	1–2	16 – Duchemin	7 – Hackley	3 – Rose	Save Mart Center; Fresno, CA
November 13, 2024*; 6:00 p.m., MWN		Boise State	L 57–72	1–3	16 – Duchemin	10 – Cutler	1 – 5 tied	ExtraMile Arena (1,090); Boise, ID
November 18, 2024*; 6:00 p.m., ESPN+		at Pepperdine	L 52–55 ^{OT}	1–4	12 – Rose	9 – Matarranz	2 – Matarranz	Firestone Fieldhouse (183); Malibu, CA
November 20, 2024*; 11:00 a.m., ESPN+		Idaho	L 42–56	1–5	11 – Tillery	5 – Cutler	1 – 5 tied	SRC Arena (88); Riverside, CA
November 26, 2024*; 5:30 p.m., FloHoops		at Cal State San Marcos	W 54–46	2–5	13 – Duchemin	9 – Duchemin	4 – Hackley	The Sports Center (198); San Marcos, CA
November 30, 2024*; 2:00 p.m., ESPN+		at Saint Mary's	W 49–41	3–5	15 – Duchemin	16 – Matarranz	3 – Tillery	University Credit Union Pavilion (315); Moraga, CA
December 5, 2024; 6:00 p.m., ESPN+		Cal State Northridge	W 72–48	4–5 (1–0)	14 – 2 tied	9 – Matarranz	3 – Marshall	SRC Arena (275); Riverside, CA
December 7, 2024; 2:00 p.m., ESPN+		at Cal State Fullerton	W 65–59	5–5 (2–0)	18 – Duchemin	6 – Matarranz	2 – 4 tied	Titan Gym (161); Fullerton, CA
December 18, 2024*; 5:00 p.m., MWN		at Utah State	W 74–59	6–5	23 – Wickstrom	7 – Wickstrom	5 – Tillery	Smith Spectrum (394); Logan, UT
December 21, 2024*; 2:30 p.m., MWN		at UNLV	L 57–80	6–6	11 – Rose	10 – Matarranz	3 – Tillery	Thomas & Mack Center (936); Paradise, NV
January 2, 2025; 6:00 p.m., ESPN+		Long Beach State	L 48–63	6–7 (2–1)	19 – Rose	6 – Cutler	3 – 3 tied	SRC Arena (136); Riverside, CA
January 4, 2025; 4:00 p.m., ESPN+		UC Irvine	W 59–54	7–7 (3–1)	14 – Duchemin	9 – Matarranz	5 – 2 tied	SRC Arena (178); Riverside, CA
January 9, 2025; 9:00 p.m., ESPN+		at Hawaii	L 47–61	7–8 (3–2)	11 – Polk	7 – Matarranz	3 – Matarranz	Stan Sheriff Center (1,562); Honolulu, HI
January 16, 2025; 6:00 p.m., ESPN+		UC Santa Barbara	W 62–52	8–8 (4–2)	14 – Rose	5 – 2 tied	3 – 2 tied	SRC Arena (203); Riverside, CA
January 18, 2025; 2:00 p.m., ESPN+		at UC San Diego	L 58–59	8–9 (4–3)	15 – Duchemin	11 – Matarranz	4 – Duchemin	LionTree Arena (382); La Jolla, CA
January 23, 2025; 6:00 p.m., ESPN+		at UC Irvine	L 53–56	8–10 (4–4)	18 – Hackley	5 – 2 tied	3 – Polk	Bren Events Center (460); Irvine, CA
January 25, 2025; 4:00 p.m., ESPN+		Cal State Bakersfield	W 60–48	9–10 (5–4)	17 – Hackley	12 – Chocano	5 – Matarranz	SRC Arena (175); Riverside, CA
January 30, 2025; 6:00 p.m., ESPN+		at UC Davis	L 41–52	9–11 (5–5)	12 – Duchemin	8 – Matarranz	2 – Rose	University Credit Union Center (515); Davis, CA
February 1, 2025; 2:00 p.m., ESPN+		at Cal Poly	W 64–56	10–11 (6–5)	16 – Hackley	8 – Duchemin	5 – Polk	Mott Athletics Center (634); San Luis Obispo, CA
February 6, 2025; 6:00 p.m., ESPN+		UC San Diego	L 49–72	10–12 (6–6)	13 – Hackley	7 – Duchemin	3 – Polk	SRC Arena (803); Riverside, CA
February 8, 2025; 2:00 p.m., ESPN+		at Cal State Bakersfield	L 58–63	10–13 (6–7)	15 – Tillery	10 – Matarranz	3 – Polk	Icardo Center (384); Bakersfield, CA
February 13, 2025; 5:00 p.m., ESPN+		UC Davis	W 55–53	11–13 (7–7)	20 – Hackley	8 – Matarranz	2 – 4 tied	SRC Arena (103); Riverside, CA
February 15, 2025; 4:00 p.m., ESPN+		at UC Santa Barbara	W 51–42	12–13 (8–7)	10 – 2 tied	10 – Duchemin	2 – Rose	The Thunderdome (736); Santa Barbara, CA
February 20, 2025; 6:00 p.m., ESPN+		at Long Beach State	L 69–75	12–14 (8–8)	17 – Hackley	8 – Matarranz	4 – 2 tied	Walter Pyramid (629); Long Beach, CA
February 22, 2025; 1:00 p.m., ESPN+/SPECTSN		Cal Poly	W 74–63	13–14 (9–8)	20 – Duchemin	6 – Duchemin	4 – Rose	SRC Arena (165); Riverside, CA
February 27, 2025; 6:00 p.m., ESPN+		Hawaii	W 61–51	14–14 (10–8)	18 – Wickstrom	7 – Matarranz	4 – Polk	SRC Arena (237); Riverside, CA
March 6, 2025; 6:00 p.m., ESPN+		at Cal State Northridge	W 77–74	15–14 (11–8)	31 – Rose	7 – Wickstrom	4 – 2 tied	Premier America Credit Union Arena (270); Northridge, CA
March 8, 2025; 4:00 p.m., ESPN+		Cal State Fullerton	W 61–51	16–14 (12–8)	17 – Wickstrom	10 – Matarranz	6 – Duchemin	SRC Arena (197); Riverside, CA
Big West tournament
March 12, 2025; 2:30 p.m., ESPN+	(7)	vs. (6) Long Beach State; First round	W 54–40	17–14	13 – Rose	7 – 2 tied	6 – Rose	Lee's Family Forum (882); Henderson, NV
March 13, 2025; 2:30 p.m., ESPN+	(7)	vs. (3) UC Davis; Quarterfinals	L 50–61	17–15	13 – Wickstrom	7 – Duchemin	3 – Hackley	Lee's Family Forum (892); Henderson, NV
*Non-conference game. ^{#}Rankings from AP poll. (#) Tournament seedings in parentheses. All times are in Pacific.
