= 2024–25 Cal Poly Mustangs women's basketball team =

American college basketball season

2024–25 Cal Poly Mustangs women's basketball
- Conference: Big West Conference
- Record: 14–18 (8–12 Big West)
- Head coach: Shanele Stires (3rd season)
- Associate head coach: Samba Johnson
- Assistant coaches: Njeri Nelms; Carlene Mitchell
- Home arena: Mott Athletics Center

2024–25 Big West women's basketball standings
	Conf.				Overall
Team	W		L	PCT	W		L	PCT
Hawai'i	16	–	4	.800	22	–	10	.688
UC Irvine	15	–	5	.750	21	–	10	.677
UC Davis	13	–	7	.650	21	–	12	.636
UC San Diego †	13	–	7	.650	20	–	16	.556
UC Santa Barbara	12	–	8	.600	18	–	13	.581
Long Beach State	12	–	8	.600	16	–	14	.533
UC Riverside	12	–	8	.600	17	–	15	.531
Cal Poly	8	–	12	.400	14	–	18	.438
Cal State Fullerton	5	–	15	.250	7	–	23	.233
Cal State Bakersfield	2	–	18	.100	2	–	28	.067
Cal State Northridge	2	–	18	.100	4	–	25	.138
† 2025 Big West tournament winner

The 2024–25 Cal Poly Mustangs women's basketball team represented California Polytechnic State University, San Luis Obispo during the 2024–25 NCAA Division I women's basketball season. The Mustangs, led by third-year head coach Shanele Stires, played their home games at the Mott Athletics Center in San Luis Obispo, California as a member of the Big West Conference.

The Mustangs finished the season 14–8, 8–12 in Big West play, to finish in eighth place. In the Big West tournament, they defeated UC Santa Barbara in the first round before losing to UC San Diego in the quarterfinals.

== Previous season ==
The Mustangs finished the 2023–24 season 17–14, 13–7 in Big West play, to finish in a three-way tie for third place. They were defeated by UC Davis in the quarterfinals of the Big West tournament. They received an at-large bid to the WNIT, where they fell to Pacific in the first round.

== Roster ==
2024–25 Cal Poly Mustangs women's basketball team
Players
Coaches

Pos.	#	Name	Height	Year	Previous school	Hometown
PG	2	Annika Shah	5 ft 3 in (1.6 m)	Sr	Palo Alto High School	Palo Alto, CA
F	4	Sierra Lichtie	6 ft 0 in (1.83 m)	RS So	Bingham High School	Riverton, UT
G	5	Gabby Robinson	5 ft 10 in (1.78 m)	Fr	Centennial High School	Yorba Linda, CA
F	9	Nora Perez	5 ft 9 in (1.75 m)	Fr	San Ignacio de Loyola	Donostia San Sebastián, Spain
G	10	Sidney Richards	5 ft 7 in (1.7 m)	Sr	San Jose State	Sacramento, CA
F	11	Avery Knapp	6 ft 1 in (1.85 m)	Fr	San Ramon Valley High School	Danville, CA
G	12	Jordan Billing	5 ft 10 in (1.78 m)	So	Emmanuel College	Gold Coast, Australia
G	13	Sadie Cohen	5 ft 8 in (1.73 m)	Fr	Windward School	Los Angeles, CA
F	14	Gillian Bears	6 ft 3 in (1.91 m)	Fr	Gonzaga Prep School	Spokane, WA
G/F	15	Sydney Bourland	5 ft 10 in (1.78 m)	Sr	Archbishop Mitty High School	San Jose, CA
F	21	Carmela Fontes	6 ft 2 in (1.88 m)	Fr	Woodside Priory School	Empalme Olmos, Uruguay
PG	22	Alana Goosby	5 ft 7 in (1.7 m)	RS Fr	Allen High School	Allen, TX
G	23	Ana Moleón Hidalgo	5 ft 9 in (1.75 m)	Fr	San Gabriel High School	Elche-Alicante, Spain
G/F	24	Mary Carter	6 ft 3 in (1.91 m)	So	Antelope High School	Rocklin, CA
G	31	Ashley Hiraki	5 ft 6 in (1.68 m)	GS	Santa Clara	San Jose, CA

Head coach

- Shanele Stires (Kansas State)

Assistant coach(es)

- Samba Johnson (Chaminade)
- Njeri Nelms (Charleston Southern)
- Carlene Mitchell (Kansas State)

Legend

- (C) Team captain
- (S) Suspended
- (I) Ineligible
- (W) Walk-on
- Injured
- Current redshirt

Roster
Last update: January 25, 2025

== Schedule and results ==
Date time, TV	Rank^{#}	Opponent^{#}	Result	Record	High points	High rebounds	High assists	Site (attendance) city, state
Exhibition
October 30, 2024*; 11:00 a.m.		Sonoma State	W 57–46	–	17 – Lichtie	11 – Lichtie	6 – Goosby	Mott Athletics Center (2,231); San Luis Obispo, CA
Regular season
November 6, 2024*; 6:00 p.m., ESPN+		UC Merced	W 72–40	1–0	14 – Shah	11 – Lichtie	5 – 2 tied	Mott Athletics Center (322); San Luis Obispo, CA
November 9, 2024*; 2:00 p.m., B1G+		at No. 3 USC	L 35–90	1–1	12 – Bourland	6 – Bourland	3 – Goosby	Galen Center (5,215); Los Angeles, CA
November 12, 2024*; 10:00 a.m., ESPN+		at Montana State	L 57–75	1–2	13 – 2 tied	7 – Bourland	4 – Shah	Worthington Arena (4,117); Bozeman, MT
November 14, 2024*; 7:00 p.m., ESPN+		at Montana	W 65–55	2–2	21 – Shah	9 – Lichtie	4 – Bourland	Dahlberg Arena (1,863); Missoula, MT
November 19, 2024*; 6:00 p.m., ESPN+		Life Pacific	W 82–36	3–2	17 – Shah	9 – Perez	7 – Shah	Mott Athletics Center (337); San Luis Obispo, CA
November 23, 2024*; 1:00 p.m., ESPN+		Idaho	L 54–74	3–3	14 – Shah	6 – Bourland	3 – Bourland	Mott Athletics Center (392); San Luis Obispo, CA
November 25, 2024*; 7:00 p.m., ACCNX		at Stanford	L 45–81	3–4	12 – 2 tied	6 – Robinson	2 – Carter	Maples Pavilion (2,733); Stanford, CA
December 5, 2024; 6:00 p.m., ESPN+		UC Davis	L 60–66	3–5 (0–1)	18 – Shah	9 – Lichtie	6 – Lichtie	Mott Athletics Center (518); San Luis Obispo, CA
December 7, 2024; 2:00 p.m., ESPN+		at Cal State Northridge	W 58–45	4–5 (1–1)	18 – Carter	10 – Carter	4 – Lichtie	Premier America Credit Union Arena (330); Northridge, CA
December 16, 2024*; 7:00 p.m., B1G+		at No. 1 UCLA	L 37–69	4–6	11 – Carter	5 – 2 tied	2 – 3 tied	Pauley Pavilion (2,356); Los Angeles, CA
December 20, 2024*; 2:00 p.m., ESPN+		Seattle	W 67–42	5–6	26 – Shah	9 – Carter	6 – Hiraki	Mott Athletics Center (495); San Luis Obispo, CA
December 28, 2024*; 1:00 p.m., ESPN+		at Southern Utah	W 66–58	6–6	25 – Shah	11 – Carter	3 – Goosby	America First Event Center (309); Cedar City, UT
January 2, 2025; 6:00 p.m., ESPN+		at UC Irvine	L 38–60	6–7 (1–2)	12 – Shah	12 – Carter	4 – Shah	Bren Events Center (792); Irvine, CA
January 4, 2025; 1:00 p.m., ESPN+		Hawaii	L 50–62	6–8 (1–3)	11 – Lichtie	6 – 2 tied	3 – Lichtie	Mott Athletics Center (448); San Luis Obispo, CA
January 9, 2025; 6:00 p.m., ESPN+		UC San Diego	W 61–56	7–8 (2–3)	27 – Shah	8 – Carter	5 – Shah	Mott Athletics Center (413); San Luis Obispo, CA
January 11, 2025; 4:00 p.m., ESPN+		at UC Santa Barbara; Blue–Green rivalry	W 51–50	8–8 (3–3)	14 – 2 tied	9 – Lichtie	3 – Hiraki	The Thunderdome (596); Santa Barbara, CA
January 16, 2025; 6:00 p.m., ESPN+		at UC Davis	L 51–63	8–9 (3–4)	16 – Lichtie	8 – Lichtie	3 – Shah	University Credit Union Center (692); Davis, CA
January 18, 2025; 2:00 p.m., ESPN+		UC Irvine	L 57–59	8–10 (3–5)	18 – Shah	15 – Lichtie	3 – 3 tied	Mott Athletics Center (531); San Luis Obispo, CA
January 25, 2025; 1:00 p.m., ESPN+/SPECTS		at Long Beach State	W 78–71	9–10 (4–5)	24 – Shah	6 – Shah	7 – Bourland	The Gold Mine (606); Long Beach, CA
January 30, 2025; 6:00 p.m., ESPN+		Cal State Bakersfield	W 51–42	10–10 (5–5)	12 – Carter	8 – Carter	3 – Lichtie	Mott Athletics Center (321); San Luis Obispo, CA
February 1, 2025; 2:00 p.m., ESPN+		UC Riverside	L 56–64	10–11 (5–6)	13 – Hiraki	9 – Lichtie	3 – Shah	Mott Athletics Center (634); San Luis Obispo, CA
February 6, 2025; 10:00 p.m., ESPN+		at Hawaii	L 43–67	10–12 (5–7)	12 – Shah	5 – Shah	2 – Lichtie	Stan Sheriff Center (1,672); Honolulu, HI
February 13, 2025; 6:00 p.m., ESPN+		Cal State Fullerton	L 64–67	10–13 (5–8)	20 – Shah	12 – Bourland	3 – Bourland	Mott Athletics Center (368); San Luis Obispo, CA
February 15, 2025; 2:00 p.m., ESPN+		Cal State Northridge	W 75–34	11–13 (6–8)	22 – Carter	5 – Perez	5 – Shah	Mott Athletics Center (443); San Luis Obispo, CA
February 20, 2025; 7:00 p.m., ESPN+		at UC San Diego	L 49–66	11–14 (6–9)	16 – Lichtie	9 – Lichtie	5 – Bourland	LionTree Arena (508); La Jolla, CA
February 22, 2025; 4:00 p.m., ESPN+		at UC Riverside	L 63–74	11–15 (6–10)	14 – Hiraki	7 – Lichtie	4 – Richards	SRC Arena (165); Riverside, CA
February 27, 2025; 6:00 p.m., ESPN+		UC Santa Barbara; Blue–Green rivalry	L 60–63	11–16 (6–11)	18 – Shah	10 – Carter	3 – Shah	Mott Athletics Center (723); San Luis Obispo, CA
March 1, 2025; 2:00 p.m., ESPN+		at Cal State Bakersfield	W 57–51	12–16 (7–11)	23 – Carter	11 – Carter	3 – Carter	Icardo Center (272); Bakersfield, CA
March 6, 2025; 7:00 p.m., ESPN+		at Cal State Fullerton	W 68–62	13–16 (8–11)	17 – Lichtie	7 – Lichtie	5 – Hiraki	Titan Gym (177); Fullerton, CA
March 8, 2025; 2:00 p.m., ESPN+		Long Beach State	L 64–72	13–17 (8–12)	27 – Carter	7 – Bourland	4 – Bourland	Mott Athletics Center (773); San Luis Obispo, CA
Big West tournament
March 12, 2025; 12:00 p.m., ESPN+	(8)	vs. (5) UC Santa Barbara; First round	W 56–54	14–17	17 – Lichtie	13 – Lichtie	3 – Lichtie	Lee's Family Forum; Henderson, NV
March 13, 2025; 12:00 p.m., ESPN+	(8)	vs. (4) UC San Diego; Quarterfinal	L 54–59	14–18	13 – Richards	7 – Richards	6 – Lichtie	Lee's Family Forum; Henderson, NV
*Non-conference game. ^{#}Rankings from AP poll. (#) Tournament seedings in parentheses. All times are in Pacific.
