= 2024–25 UC Santa Barbara Gauchos women's basketball team =

American college basketball season

2024–25 UC Santa Barbara Gauchos women's basketball
- Conference: Big West Conference
- Record: 18–13 (12–8 Big West)
- Head coach: Renee Jimenez (1st season)
- Assistant coaches: Chelsea Carlisle; Daisy Feder; Dario Frias; Kai Harris; Kelsey Forrester
- Home arena: The Thunderdome

2024–25 Big West women's basketball standings
	Conf.				Overall
Team	W		L	PCT	W		L	PCT
Hawai'i	16	–	4	.800	22	–	10	.688
UC Irvine	15	–	5	.750	21	–	10	.677
UC Davis	13	–	7	.650	21	–	12	.636
UC San Diego †	13	–	7	.650	20	–	16	.556
UC Santa Barbara	12	–	8	.600	18	–	13	.581
Long Beach State	12	–	8	.600	16	–	14	.533
UC Riverside	12	–	8	.600	17	–	15	.531
Cal Poly	8	–	12	.400	14	–	18	.438
Cal State Fullerton	5	–	15	.250	7	–	23	.233
Cal State Bakersfield	2	–	18	.100	2	–	28	.067
Cal State Northridge	2	–	18	.100	4	–	25	.138
† 2025 Big West tournament winner

The 2024–25 UC Santa Barbara Gauchos women's basketball team represented the University of California, Santa Barbara during the 2024–25 NCAA Division I women's basketball season. The Gauchos, led by first-year head coach Renee Jimenez, played their home games at The Thunderdome in Santa Barbara, California as members of the Big West Conference.

== Previous season ==
The Gauchos finished the 2023–24 season 16–15, 10–10 in Big West play to finish in sixth place. They were defeated by Long Beach State in the first round of the Big West tournament.

On March 20, 2024, head coach Bonnie Henrickson announced that she would be retiring, ending her lengthy coaching career, after leading the Gauchos for nine seasons. On April 17, it was announced that Cal State San Marcos head coach Renee Jimenez would be stepping down from her position as head coach, in order to take the same position at UC Santa Barbara.

== Roster ==
2024–25 UC Santa Barbara Gauchos women's basketball team
Players
Coaches

Pos.	#	Name	Height	Year	Previous school	Hometown
F	2	Zoe Borter	6 ft 0 in (1.83 m)	So	Beaverton High School	Beaverton, Oregon
G	3	Alyssa Marin (5Y)	5 ft 9 in (1.75 m)	Sr	Camarillo High School	Camarillo, California
F	5	Olivia Bradley	6 ft 1 in (1.85 m)	RS Fr	Urrbrae Agricultural High School	Adelaide, Australia
G	10	Anya Choice (5Y)	5 ft 8 in (1.73 m)	Sr	Cardinal Newman High School	Santa Rosa, California
F	11	Cayla Williams	6 ft 2 in (1.88 m)	Sr	Richmond	Vienna, Virginia
G	12	Bojana Radnjic	5 ft 9 in (1.75 m)	Fr	Hoosac School	Herceg Novi, Montenegro
C	13	Flora Goed	6 ft 4 in (1.93 m)	Sr	Casper College	Vienna, Austria
G	14	Kanani Coon	6 ft 2 in (1.88 m)	So	Okanagan Mission Secondary School	Kelowna, British Columbia
C	20	Laurel Rockwood	6 ft 4 in (1.93 m)	RS Jr	Foothill High School	Henderson, Nevada
F	21	Karena Eberts	6 ft 1 in (1.85 m)	Fr	Miramonte High School	Orinda, California
G	24	Arshiya Ranjitkar	5 ft 7 in (1.7 m)	Fr	Piedmont High School	Union City, California
F	25	Analillia Cabuena	6 ft 0 in (1.83 m)	Sr	Lincoln High School	Stockton, California
G	31	Martha Pietsch	5 ft 5 in (1.65 m)	Jr	Oregon State	Berlin, Germany
G	32	Jessica Grant	5 ft 8 in (1.73 m)	Jr	Mission Hills High School	San Marcos, California
G	35	Malani Mastora	5 ft 11 in (1.8 m)	Fr	Alameda High School	Alameda, California
G	55	Skylar Burke	5 ft 8 in (1.73 m)	Jr	Coeur d'Alene High School	Coeur d'Alene, Idaho

Head coach

- Renee Jimenez (San Francisco State)

Assistant coach(es)

- Chelsea Carlisle (UC San Diego)
- Daisy Feder (UC San Diego)
- Dario Frias (Cal State San Bernardino)
- Kai Harris (Missouri State)
- Kelsey Forrester (Cal State San Marcos)

Legend

- (C) Team captain
- (S) Suspended
- (I) Ineligible
- (W) Walk-on
- (5Y) Fifth-year senior
- Injured
- Current redshirt

Roster
Last update: January 24, 2025

== Schedule and results ==
Date time, TV	Rank^{#}	Opponent^{#}	Result	Record	High points	High rebounds	High assists	Site (attendance) city, state
Regular season
November 6, 2024*; 7:00 pm, ESPN+		Claremont-Mudd-Scripps	W 70–26	1–0	12 – Tied	10 – Rockwood	5 – Pietsch	The Thunderdome (378); Santa Barbara, CA
November 9, 2024*; 3:30 pm, ESPN+		at San Francisco	L 37–59	1–1	16 – Marin	5 – Borter	1 – Pietsch	Sobrato Center (516); San Francisco, CA
November 14, 2024*; 7:00 pm, ESPN+		Nevada	L 73–80 ^{OT}	1–2	31 – Marin	11 – Rockwood	3 – Burke	The Thunderdome (492); Santa Barbara, CA
November 17, 2024*; 2:00 pm, ESPN+		San Jose State	W 86–76	2–2	31 – Marin	6 – Burke	3 – Tied	The Thunderdome (501); Santa Barbara, CA
November 21, 2024*; 7:00 pm, ESPN+		Cal Lutheran	W 96–60	3–2	19 – Marin	7 – Rockwood	5 – Burke	The Thunderdome (489); Santa Barbara, CA
November 24, 2024*; 2:00 pm, ESPN+		San Diego	W 71–63 ^{OT}	4–2	21 – Burke	7 – Burke	5 – Marin	The Thunderdome (592); Santa Barbara, CA
November 29, 2024*; 1:30 pm, ESPN+		at Grand Canyon; GCU Thanksgiving Classic	L 58–69	4–3	15 – Marin	9 – Rockwood	2 – Burke	Global Credit Union Arena (482); Phoenix, AZ
November 30, 2024*; 11:00 am, GCU Lopes Live		vs. Seattle; GCU Thanksgiving Classic	W 72–62	5–3	22 – Borter	8 – Rockwood	4 – Pietsch	Global Credit Union Arena (131); Phoenix, AZ
December 5, 2024; 7:00 pm, ESPN+		at UC San Diego	W 80–66	6–3 (1–0)	29 – Marin	8 – Rockwood	4 – Marin	LionTree Arena (362); La Jolla, CA
December 7, 2024; 4:00 pm, ESPN+		UC Davis	L 50–72	6–4 (1–1)	12 – Marin	7 – Williams	2 – Marin	The Thunderdome (450); Santa Barbara, CA
December 15, 2024*; 2:00 pm, ESPN+		Pacific	W 63–50	7–4	18 – Burke	7 – Tied	3 – Tied	The Thunderdome (444); Santa Barbara, CA
December 20, 2024*; 6:00 pm, ESPN+		at Eastern Washington	L 46–54	7–5	11 – Burke	9 – Burke	2 – Grant	Reese Court (496); Cheney, WA
January 2, 2025; 7:00 pm, ESPN+		Hawai'i	W 72–62	8–5 (2–1)	14 – Williams	9 – Burke	3 – Tied	The Thunderdome (622); Santa Barbara, CA
January 9, 2025; 6:30 pm, ESPN+		at Cal State Bakersfield	W 61–57	9–5 (3–1)	20 – Marin	11 – Burke	2 – Burke	Icardo Center (269); Bakersfield, CA
January 11, 2025; 4:00 pm, ESPN+		Cal Poly; Blue–Green Rivalry	L 50–51	9–6 (3–2)	11 – Burke	9 – Borter	3 – Choice	The Thunderdome (596); Santa Barbara, CA
January 16, 2025; 6:00 pm, ESPN+		at UC Riverside	L 52–62	9–7 (3–3)	16 – Borter	4 – Borter	3 – Burke	SRC Arena (203); Riverside, CA
January 18, 2025; 2:00 pm, ESPN+		at UC Davis	W 63–50	10–7 (4–3)	19 – Grant	9 – Burke	3 – Marin	University Credit Union Center (816); Davis, CA
January 23, 2025; 7:00 pm, ESPN+		UC San Diego	L 43–62	10–8 (4–4)	13 – Marin	6 – Tied	2 – Burke	The Thunderdome (572); Santa Barbara, CA
January 25, 2025; 4:00 pm, ESPN+		Cal State Fullerton	L 61–64	10–9 (4–5)	13 – Marin	5 – Tied	3 – Tied	The Thunderdome (612); Santa Barbara, CA
January 30, 2025; 11:00 am, ESPN+		at Cal State Northridge	W 68–53	11–9 (5–5)	20 – Borter	5 – Burke	5 – Burke	Premier America Credit Union Arena (1,704); Northridge, CA
February 1, 2025; 2:00 pm, ESPN+		at Long Beach State	W 77–68	12–9 (6–5)	25 – Burke	11 – Burke	4 – Bradley	Walter Pyramid (1,112); Long Beach, CA
February 6, 2025; 7:00 pm, ESPN+		Cal State Bakersfield	W 51–40	13–9 (7–5)	15 – Borter	12 – Burke	3 – Grant	The Thunderdome (478); Santa Barbara, CA
February 8, 2025; 9:00 pm, ESPN+		at Hawai'i	L 58–65	13–10 (7–6)	20 – Burke	9 – Burke	4 – Burke	Stan Sheriff Center (2,129); Honolulu, HI
February 13, 2025; 7:00 pm, ESPN+		UC Irvine	W 62–52	14–10 (8–6)	18 – Marin	5 – Tied	5 – Marin	The Thunderdome (533); Santa Barbara, CA
February 15, 2025; 4:00 pm, ESPN+		UC Riverside	L 42–51	14–11 (8–7)	15 – Marin	6 – Burke	3 – Williams	The Thunderdome (736); Santa Barbara, CA
February 20, 2025; 7:00 pm, ESPN+		at Cal State Fullerton	W 80–56	15–11 (9–7)	18 – Marin	6 – Borter	3 – Choice	Titan Gym (143); Fullerton, CA
February 22, 2025; 4:00 pm, ESPN+		Long Beach State	W 73–58	16–11 (10–7)	18 – Tied	11 – Bradley	3 – Tied	The Thunderdome (965); Santa Barbara, CA
February 27, 2025; 6:00 pm, ESPN+		at Cal Poly; Blue–Green Rivalry	W 63–60	17–11 (11–7)	12 – Tied	8 – Bradley	3 – Burke	Mott Athletics Center (723); San Luis Obispo, CA
March 1, 2025; 4:00 pm, ESPN+		Cal State Northridge	W 74–52	18–11 (12–7)	23 – Marin	12 – Rockwood	6 – Marin	The Thunderdome (594); Santa Barbara, CA
March 8, 2025; 1:00 pm, ESPN+		at UC Irvine	L 49–62	18–12 (12–8)	11 – Tied	6 – Rockwood	3 – Burke	Bren Events Center (730); Irvine, CA
Big West tournament
March 12, 2025; 12:00 pm, ESPN+	(5)	vs. (8) Cal Poly; First round	L 54–56	18–13	23 – Marin	7 – Tied	3 – Marin	Lee's Family Forum; Henderson, NV
*Non-conference game. ^{#}Rankings from AP Poll. (#) Tournament seedings in parentheses. All times are in Pacific.
