= 2024–25 Hawaii Rainbow Wahine basketball team =

American college basketball season

2024–25 Hawaii Rainbow Wahine basketball

Big West regular season champions

WBIT, First round
- Conference: Big West Conference
- Record: 22–10 (16–4 Big West)
- Head coach: Laura Beeman (13th season)
- Associate head coach: Alex Delanian
- Assistant coaches: Derrick Florence; Khalilah Mitchell
- Home arena: Stan Sheriff Center

2024–25 Big West women's basketball standings
	Conf.				Overall
Team	W		L	PCT	W		L	PCT
Hawai'i	16	–	4	.800	22	–	10	.688
UC Irvine	15	–	5	.750	21	–	10	.677
UC Davis	13	–	7	.650	21	–	12	.636
UC San Diego †	13	–	7	.650	20	–	16	.556
UC Santa Barbara	12	–	8	.600	18	–	13	.581
Long Beach State	12	–	8	.600	16	–	14	.533
UC Riverside	12	–	8	.600	17	–	15	.531
Cal Poly	8	–	12	.400	14	–	18	.438
Cal State Fullerton	5	–	15	.250	7	–	23	.233
Cal State Bakersfield	2	–	18	.100	2	–	28	.067
Cal State Northridge	2	–	18	.100	4	–	25	.138
† 2025 Big West tournament winner

The 2024–25 Hawaii Rainbow Wahine basketball team represented the University of Hawaiʻi at Mānoa during the 2024–25 NCAA Division I women's basketball season. The Rainbow Wahine, led by 13th-year head coach Laura Beeman, played their home games at Stan Sheriff Center in Honolulu, Hawaii, as members of the Big West Conference.

== Previous season ==
The Rainbow Wahine finished the 2023–24 season 20–11, 17–3 in Big West play to finish as Big West regular season champions. They were upset by UC Davis in the semifinals of the Big West tournament. They received an automatic bid to the WBIT, where they would be defeated by California in the first round.

== Roster ==
2024–25 Hawaii Rainbow Wahine women's basketball team
Players
Coaches

Pos.	#	Name	Height	Year	Previous school	Hometown
G	1	Kelsie Imai	5 ft 7 in (1.7 m)	Sr	Waiakea High School	Pahoa, Hawaii
G	2	Mia 'Uhila	5 ft 8 in (1.73 m)	Sr	Portland State	Anchorage, Alaska
G	3	Lily Wahinekapu	5 ft 7 in (1.7 m)	Sr	Cal State Fullerton	Kaneohe, Hawaii
G	4	Jovi Lefotu	5 ft 8 in (1.73 m)	RS So	ʻIolani School	Kaneohe, Hawaii
F	8	Rebecca Moors	6 ft 2 in (1.88 m)	Fr	Westlake Girls High School	Auckland, New Zealand
F	10	Danijela Kujovic	6 ft 1 in (1.85 m)	Fr	Our Lady of Mercy College	Victoria, Australia
G	11	Kira-May Filemu	5 ft 11 in (1.8 m)	Fr	Westfields Sports High School	Wattle Grove, Australia
F	12	Imani Perez	6 ft 4 in (1.93 m)	Jr	Mullen High School	Denver, Colorado
G	13	Hallie Birdsong	5 ft 3 in (1.6 m)	Sr	Kalani High School	Honolulu, Hawaii
F/C	14	Brooklyn Rewers	6 ft 4 in (1.93 m)	Sr	Michigan State	Coeur d'Alene, Idaho
G	15	Daejah Phillips	5 ft 10 in (1.78 m)	Sr	Centennial High School	Las Vegas, Nevada
G	22	Jade Peacock	6 ft 0 in (1.83 m)	So	Hillcrest Christian College	Gold Coast, Australia
G	23	MeiLani McBee	5 ft 10 in (1.78 m)	Sr	Kennewick High School	Kennewick, Washington
C	24	Ritorya Tamilo	6 ft 5 in (1.96 m)	Fr	Baradene College	Auckland, New Zealand
F	34	Jacque David	5 ft 11 in (1.8 m)	Sr	William Chrisman High School	Independence, Missouri
C	53	Vivienne Berrett	6 ft 4 in (1.93 m)	So	Stanwood High School	Stanwood, Washington

Head coach

- Laura Beeman (Cal State San Bernardino)

Assistant coach(es)

- Alex Delanian (USC)
- Derrick Florence (Morehouse)
- Khalilah Mitchell (LSU)

Legend

- (C) Team captain
- (S) Suspended
- (I) Ineligible
- (W) Walk-on
- Injured
- Current redshirt

Roster
Last update: January 23, 2025

== Schedule and results ==
Date time, TV	Rank^{#}	Opponent^{#}	Result	Record	High points	High rebounds	High assists	Site (attendance) city, state
Exhibition
October 27, 2024*; 2:00 pm		at Hawaii–Hilo	W 69–50	–	13 – Rewers	9 – Perez	3 – Tied	Afook-Chinen Civic Auditorium (1,291); Hilo, HI
November 2, 2024*; 2:00 pm		vs. Chaminade	W 73–31	–	16 – Tamilo	5 – Tamilo	3 – Tied	Ka'ulaheanuiokamoku Gym (202); Pukalani, HI
Regular season
November 7, 2024*; 4:00 pm, ESPN+		at Portland	L 65–76	0–1	19 – Phillips	4 – Phillips	3 – Lefotu	Chiles Center (512); Portland, OR
November 9, 2024*; 5:30 pm, ESPN+		at Portland State	W 72–50	1–1	12 – McBee	6 – 'Uhila	3 – Tied	Viking Pavilion (437); Portland, OR
November 22, 2024*; 11:00 am, ESPN+		Louisiana–Monroe; Bank of Hawai‘i Classic	W 69–64	2–1	20 – Wahinekapu	8 – Tamilo	6 – Phillips	Stan Sheriff Center (2,694); Honolulu, HI
November 24, 2024*; 2:30 pm, ESPN+		Eastern Washington; Bank of Hawai‘i Classic	W 67–55	3–1	12 – McBee	8 – Wahinekapu	4 – Wahinekapu	Stan Sheriff Center (1,744); Honolulu, HI
November 29, 2024*; 2:30 pm, SPECTS/ESPN+		Fresno State; Rainbow Wahine Showdown	W 50–47	4–1	16 – Tamilo	7 – Tied	6 – Phillips	Stan Sheriff Center (1,658); Honolulu, HI
November 30, 2024*; 2:30 pm, ESPN+		UT Martin; Rainbow Wahine Showdown	W 47–39	5–1	10 – Wahinekapu	10 – Wahinekapu	3 – Wahinekapu	Stan Sheriff Center (1,552); Honolulu, HI
December 1, 2024*; 2:30 pm, SPECTS/ESPN+		No. 1 UCLA; Rainbow Wahine Showdown	L 49–70	5–2	10 – Wahinekapu	6 – Rewers	3 – Imai	Stan Sheriff Center (2,481); Honolulu, HI
December 7, 2024; 7:00 pm, SPECTS/ESPN+		Long Beach State	L 69–73 ^{OT}	5–3 (0–1)	20 – Wahinekapu	9 – Tied	3 – Tied	Stan Sheriff Center (1,762); Honolulu, HI
December 16, 2024*; 7:00 pm, SPECTSN/ESPN+		Arkansas–Pine Bluff	W 56–15	6–3	13 – Rewers	8 – Rewers	4 – Imai	Stan Sheriff Center (1,610); Honolulu, HI
December 20, 2024*; 1:30 pm, BallerTV		vs. Clemson; San Diego Classic	L 58–72	6–4	16 – Rewers	3 – Tied	6 – 'Uhila	Viejas Arena (205); San Diego, CA
December 21, 2024*; 1:30 pm, MWN		at San Diego State; San Diego Classic	L 52–54	6–5	11 – Phillips	5 – Tied	6 – Wahinekapu	Viejas Arena (1,410); San Diego, CA
January 2, 2025; 5:00 pm, ESPN+		at UC Santa Barbara	L 62–72	6–6 (0–2)	17 – Wahinekapu	7 – Phillips	3 – Wahinekapu	The Thunderdome (622); Santa Barbara, CA
January 4, 2025; 11:00 am, SPECTSN/ESPN+		at Cal Poly	W 62–50	7–6 (1–2)	14 – Tied	8 – Tamilo	7 – Wahinekapu	Mott Athletics Center (448); San Luis Obispo, CA
January 9, 2025; 7:00 pm, SPECTS/ESPN+		UC Riverside	W 61–47	8–6 (2–2)	15 – Rewers	9 – 'Uhila	5 – Wahinekapu	Stan Sheriff Center (1,562); Honolulu, HI
January 11, 2025; 7:00 pm, SPECTS/ESPN+		Cal State Fullerton	W 54–44	9–6 (3–2)	14 – Perez	6 – Tied	5 – Lefotu	Stan Sheriff Center (1,951); Honolulu, HI
January 16, 2025; 4:00 pm, ESPN+		at Cal State Northridge	W 75–47	10–6 (4–2)	19 – Perez	8 – 'Uhila	7 – 'Uhila	Premier America Credit Union Arena (160); Northridge, CA
January 18, 2025; 12:00 pm, ESPN+		at Cal State Bakersfield	W 66–37	11–6 (5–2)	15 – Rewers	6 – Tamilo	2 – Tied	Icardo Center (251); Bakersfield, CA
January 23, 2025; 7:00 pm, SPECTS/ESPN+		UC Davis	W 56–46	12–6 (6–2)	12 – Rewers	9 – Perez	2 – Wahinekapu	Stan Sheriff Center (1,652); Honolulu, HI
January 25, 2025; 7:00 pm, SPECTS/ESPN+		UC Irvine	W 46–42	13–6 (7–2)	13 – Wahinekapu	11 – Tamilo	4 – 'Uhila	Stan Sheriff Center (3,695); Honolulu, HI
January 30, 2025; 5:00 pm, ESPN+		at UC San Diego	W 65–63	14–6 (8–2)	19 – Wahinekapu	8 – Wahinekapu	4 – Imai	LionTree Arena (435); La Jolla, CA
February 1, 2025; 12:00 pm, ESPN+		at Cal State Fullerton	W 54–47	15–6 (9–2)	11 – Rewers	5 – Tied	2 – Tied	Titan Gym (307); Fullerton, CA
February 6, 2025; 7:00 pm, SPECTS/ESPN+		Cal Poly	W 67–43	16–6 (10–2)	15 – Lefotu	9 – Rewers	3 – 'Uhila	Stan Sheriff Center (1,672); Honolulu, HI
February 8, 2025; 7:00 pm, SPECTS/ESPN+		UC Santa Barbara	W 65–58	17–6 (11–2)	23 – 'Uhila	7 – 'Uhila	4 – 'Uhila	Stan Sheriff Center (2,129); Honolulu, HI
February 13, 2025; 4:00 pm, ESPN+		at Long Beach State	W 72–65	18–6 (12–2)	15 – Tamilo	7 – Tied	3 – Tied	Walter Pyramid (591); Long Beach, CA
February 15, 2025; 12:00 pm, ESPN+		at UC Irvine	W 49–44	19–6 (13–2)	12 – Imai	10 – Tamilo	3 – Imai	Bren Events Center (949); Irvine, CA
February 22, 2025; 7:00 pm, SPECTS/ESPN+		UC San Diego	W 49–44	20–6 (14–2)	13 – Wahinekapu	9 – Perez	7 – Imai	Stan Sheriff Center (2,781); Honolulu, HI
February 27, 2025; 4:00 pm, ESPN+		at UC Riverside	L 51–61	20–7 (14–3)	12 – Perez	7 – Wahinekapu	4 – Perez	SRC Arena (237); Riverside, CA
March 1, 2025; 12:00 pm, ESPN+		at UC Davis	L 66–74	20–8 (14–4)	15 – Lefotu	8 – Tamilo	3 – Tied	University Credit Union Center (1,198); Davis, CA
March 6, 2025; 7:00 pm, SPECTS/ESPN+		Cal State Bakersfield	W 66–51	21–8 (15–4)	12 – Imai	6 – Tamilo	4 – Filemu	Stan Sheriff Center (1,886); Honolulu, HI
March 8, 2025; 7:00 pm, SPECTS/ESPN+		Cal State Northridge	W 62–36	22–8 (16–4)	18 – Wahinekapu	13 – Rewers	3 – Tied	Stan Sheriff Center (3,579); Honolulu, HI
Big West tournament
March 14, 2025; 9:00 am, ESPN+	(1)	vs. (4) UC San Diego; Semifinals	L 49–51	22–9	12 – Wahinekapu	7 – Wahinekapu	6 – Wahinekapu	Lee's Family Forum; Henderson, NV
WBIT
March 20, 2025*; 3:30 pm, ESPN+		at (2) UNLV; First Round	L 46–63	22–10	18 – Wahinekapu	4 – Rewers	2 – Wahinekapu	Cox Pavilion (800); Paradise, NV
*Non-conference game. ^{#}Rankings from AP Poll. (#) Tournament seedings in parentheses. All times are in Hawaii–Aleutian.
