= 2024–25 UC San Diego Tritons women's basketball team =

American college basketball season

2024–25 UC San Diego Tritons women's basketball

Big West tournament champions

NCAA tournament, First Four
- Conference: Big West Conference
- Record: 20–16 (13–7 Big West)
- Head coach: Heidi VanDerveer (13th season)
- Associate head coach: Vanessa Nygaard
- Assistant coaches: Britinee Yasukochi; PhyNique Allen; Alexandria Young; Miranda Seto
- Home arena: LionTree Arena

2024–25 Big West women's basketball standings
	Conf.				Overall
Team	W		L	PCT	W		L	PCT
Hawai'i	16	–	4	.800	22	–	10	.688
UC Irvine	15	–	5	.750	21	–	10	.677
UC Davis	13	–	7	.650	21	–	12	.636
UC San Diego †	13	–	7	.650	20	–	16	.556
UC Santa Barbara	12	–	8	.600	18	–	13	.581
Long Beach State	12	–	8	.600	16	–	14	.533
UC Riverside	12	–	8	.600	17	–	15	.531
Cal Poly	8	–	12	.400	14	–	18	.438
Cal State Fullerton	5	–	15	.250	7	–	23	.233
Cal State Bakersfield	2	–	18	.100	2	–	28	.067
Cal State Northridge	2	–	18	.100	4	–	25	.138
† 2025 Big West tournament winner

The 2024–25 UC San Diego Tritons women's basketball team represented the University of California, San Diego during the 2024–25 NCAA Division I women's basketball season. The Tritons, led by 13th-year head coach Heidi VanDerveer, played their home games at LionTree Arena in La Jolla, California, as members of the Big West Conference.

This is the first year the team will be eligible for the NCAA tournament, as UC San Diego has officially completed their four-year mandatory transition to Division I sports.

== Previous season ==
The Tritons finished the 2023–24 season 12–19, 8–12 in Big West play to finish in a tie for seventh place. Since they were in the final year of the a four-year mandatory transition period from Division II to Division I, they were ineligible to participate in the Big West tournament.

== Roster ==
2024–25 UC San Diego Tritons women's basketball team
Players
Coaches

Pos.	#	Name	Height	Year	Previous school	Hometown
G	2	Grace Talbot	5 ft 7 in (1.7 m)	Jr	Chatfield Senior High School	Littleton, Colorado
G	3	Sumayah Sugapong	5 ft 7 in (1.7 m)	So	La Jolla Country Day School	San Diego, California
G	5	Gabby Louther	5 ft 11 in (1.8 m)	Jr	Pueblo West High School	Pueblo West, Colorado
F/C	11	Erin Condron	6 ft 4 in (1.93 m)	So	Braemar College	Woodend, Australia
G	12	Rosa Smith	5 ft 7 in (1.7 m)	RS So	Idaho	Kirkland, Washington
F	13	Meaali‘i Amosa	6 ft 1 in (1.85 m)	Sr	Pepperdine	Garden Grove, California
G	15	Sabrina Ma	5 ft 10 in (1.78 m)	Jr	San Jose State	San Francisco, California
G	20	Izzy Forsyth	6 ft 0 in (1.83 m)	Sr	Semiahmoo Secondary School	Vancouver, British Columbia
G/F	21	Nicki Polocheck	6 ft 0 in (1.83 m)	Fr	Memorial Senior High School	Houston, Texas
G	22	Gracie Gallegos	6 ft 1 in (1.85 m)	RS So	Mullen High School	Denver, Colorado
G	23	Eri Blithikioti	5 ft 11 in (1.8 m)	So	ACS Athens	Athens, Greece
F	24	Kayanna Spriggs	6 ft 2 in (1.88 m)	Sr	Cal State Northridge	San Diego, California
G	25	Junaé Mahan	5 ft 8 in (1.73 m)	RS So	Lincoln High School	Stockton, California
F	30	Damilola Sule	6 ft 0 in (1.83 m)	Sr	UC Merced	Bakersfield, California
G	32	Parker Montgomery	5 ft 7 in (1.7 m)	GS	Marlborough School	Porter Ranch, California
C	33	Emma Svoboda	6 ft 3 in (1.91 m)	Sr	Oklahoma	La Quinta, California

Head coach

- Heidi VanDerveer (College of Charleston)

Assistant coach(es)

- Vanessa Nygaard (Stanford)
- Britinee Yasukochi (Occidental)
- PhyNique Allen (Cal State Bakersfield)
- Alexandria Young (San Diego)
- Miranda Seto (UC San Diego)

Legend

- (C) Team captain
- (S) Suspended
- (I) Ineligible
- (W) Walk-on
- Injured
- Current redshirt

Roster
Last update: January 24, 2025

== Schedule and results ==
Date time, TV	Rank^{#}	Opponent^{#}	Result	Record	High points	High rebounds	High assists	Site (attendance) city, state
Regular season
November 4, 2024*; 7:00 pm, ESPN+		Occidental	W 86–51	1–0	15 – Ma	7 – Spriggs	3 – Blithikioti	LionTree Arena (317); La Jolla, CA
November 7, 2024*; 6:30 pm, ESPN+		at Sacramento State	L 60–71	1–1	15 – Mahan	7 – Mahan	4 – Sugapong	Hornets Nest (340); Sacramento, CA
November 10, 2024*; 2:00 pm, ESPN+		Arizona	L 54–65	1–2	14 – Montgomery	8 – Spriggs	3 – Blithikioti	LionTree Arena (754); La Jolla, CA
November 14, 2024*; 11:00 am, ESPN+		Saint Mary's	L 65–74 ^{2OT}	1–3	15 – Sugapong	9 – Spriggs	3 – Tied	LionTree Arena (2,649); La Jolla, CA
November 17, 2024*; 2:00 pm, ESPN+		Fresno State	L 53–65	1–4	22 – Ma	6 – Spriggs	4 – Sugapong	LionTree Arena (1,002); La Jolla, CA
November 22, 2024*; 5:30 pm, MWN		at Air Force	L 64–67 ^{OT}	1–5	16 – Gallegos	9 – Tied	5 – Sugapong	Clune Arena (691); Colorado Springs, CO
November 24, 2024*; 12:00 pm, SLN		at Denver	L 59–67 ^{OT}	1–6	17 – Sugapong	7 – Gallegos	3 – Sugapong	Hamilton Gymnasium (413); Denver, CO
November 29, 2024*; 2:00 pm, ACCNX		at Stanford	L 54–84	1–7	21 – Sugapong	6 – Sugapong	3 – Sugapong	Maples Pavilion (3,001); Stanford, CA
December 5, 2024; 7:00 pm, ESPN+		UC Santa Barbara	L 66–80	1–8 (0–1)	18 – Sugapong	8 – Spriggs	5 – Sugapong	LionTree Arena (362); La Jolla, CA
December 7, 2024; 2:00 pm, ESPN+		at Cal State Bakersfield	W 55–40	2–8 (1–1)	20 – Gallegos	9 – Gallegos	4 – Sugapong	Icardo Center (239); Bakersfield, CA
December 14, 2024*; 1:00 pm, ESPN+		at California Baptist	W 81–58	3–8	24 – Sugapong	12 – Sule	7 – Sugapong	Fowler Events Center (427); Riverside, CA
December 19, 2024*; 2:00 pm, ESPN+		Northern Kentucky; UC San Diego Classic	L 50–58	3–9	10 – Montgomery	10 – Spriggs	5 – Sugapong	LionTree Arena (335); La Jolla, CA
December 21, 2024*; 12:00 pm, ESPN+		La Salle; UC San Diego Classic	W 69–53	4–9	17 – Tied	15 – Spriggs	5 – Sugapong	LionTree Arena (357); La Jolla, CA
December 29, 2024*; 2:00 pm, ESPN+		Life Pacific	W 71–30	5–9	17 – Spriggs	9 – Tied	7 – Sugapong	LionTree Arena (404); La Jolla, CA
January 4, 2025; 2:00 pm, ESPN+		Cal State Fullerton	W 57–45	6–9 (1–2)	15 – Sugapong	9 – Blithikioti	4 – Sugapong	LionTree Arena (392); La Jolla, CA
January 9, 2025; 6:00 pm, ESPN+		at Cal Poly	L 56–61	6–10 (2–2)	23 – Sugapong	10 – Condron	3 – Tied	Mott Athletics Center (413); San Luis Obispo, CA
January 11, 2025; 2:00 pm, ESPN+		at UC Irvine	L 66–73	6–11 (2–3)	17 – Ma	12 – Spriggs	5 – Spriggs	Bren Events Center (877); Irvine, CA
January 16, 2025; 7:00 pm, ESPN+		Long Beach State	W 79–68	7–11 (3–3)	17 – Tied	8 – Condron	4 – Sugapong	LionTree Arena (1,982); La Jolla, CA
January 18, 2025; 2:00 pm, ESPN+		UC Riverside	W 59–58	8–11 (4–3)	17 – Ma	6 – Tied	5 – Sugapong	LionTree Arena (382); La Jolla, CA
January 23, 2025; 7:00 pm, ESPN+		at UC Santa Barbara	W 62–43	9–11 (5–3)	21 – Sugapong	11 – Ma	3 – Sugapong	The Thunderdome (572); Santa Barbara, CA
January 25, 2025; 2:00 pm, ESPN+		at Cal State Northridge	W 82–44	10–11 (6–3)	23 – Sugapong	7 – Gallegos	4 – Sugapong	Premier America Credit Union Arena (250); Northridge, CA
January 30, 2025; 7:00 pm, ESPN+		Hawai'i	L 63–65 ^{OT}	10–12 (6–4)	17 – Sugapong	18 – Condron	5 – Sugapong	LionTree Arena (435); La Jolla, CA
February 6, 2025; 6:00 pm, ESPN+		at UC Riverside	W 72–49	11–12 (7–4)	20 – Sugapong	10 – Spriggs	3 – Tied	SRC Arena (803); Riverside, CA
February 8, 2025; 2:00 pm, ESPN+		UC Irvine	L 49–56	11–13 (7–5)	15 – Sugapong	9 – Ma	2 – Tied	LionTree Arena (853); La Jolla, CA
February 13, 2025; 7:00 pm, ESPN+		Cal State Bakersfield	W 63–45	12–13 (8–5)	12 – Sugapong	9 – Sugapong	5 – Ma	LionTree Arena (501); La Jolla, CA
February 15, 2025; 2:00 pm, ESPN+		at UC Davis	W 65–63	13–13 (9–5)	23 – Sugapong	10 – Tied	2 – Sugapong	University Credit Union Center (702); Davis, CA
February 20, 2025; 7:00 pm, ESPN+		Cal Poly	W 66–49	14–13 (10–5)	14 – Ma	9 – Spriggs	5 – Gallegos	LionTree Arena (508); La Jolla, CA
February 22, 2025; 9:00 pm, ESPN+		at Hawai'i	L 44–49	14–14 (10–6)	12 – Tied	11 – Montgomery	2 – Gallegos	Stan Sheriff Center (2,781); Honolulu, HI
February 27, 2025; 7:00 pm, ESPN+		Cal State Northridge	W 78–64	15–14 (11–6)	17 – Montgomery	13 – Spriggs	6 – Sugapong	LionTree Arena (300); La Jolla, CA
March 1, 2025; 2:00 pm, ESPN+		at Cal State Fullerton	W 69–46	16–14 (12–6)	23 – Ma	11 – Spriggs	3 – Sugapong	Titan Gym (155); Fullerton, CA
March 6, 2025; 6:00 pm, ESPN+		at Long Beach State	W 82–51	17–14 (13–6)	18 – Sugapong	10 – Spriggs	9 – Sugapong	Walter Pyramid (623); Long Beach, CA
March 8, 2025; 2:00 pm, ESPN+		UC Davis	L 58–69	17–15 (13–7)	18 – Sugapong	9 – Gallegos	5 – Gallegos	LionTree Arena (472); La Jolla, CA
Big West tournament
March 13, 2025; 12:00 pm, ESPN+	(4)	vs. (8) Cal Poly; Quarterfinal	W 59–54	18–15	29 – Sugapong	11 – Spriggs	3 – Gallegos	Lee's Family Forum; Henderson, NV
March 14, 2025; 12:00 pm, ESPN+	(4)	vs. (1) Hawai'i; Semifinal	W 51–49	19–15	17 – Sugapong	10 – Gallegos	3 – Ma	Lee's Family Forum; Henderson, NV
March 15, 2025; 3:00 pm, ESPN+	(4)	vs. (3) UC Davis; Championship	W 75–66	20–15	24 – Gallegos	7 – Tied	3 – Tied	Lee's Family Forum; Henderson, NV
NCAA tournament
March 19, 2025; 6:00 pm, ESPNU	(16 S1)	vs. (16 S1) Southern; First Four	L 56–68	20–16	19 – Sugapong	5 – Sugapong	6 – Sugapong	Pauley Pavilion (603); Los Angeles, CA
*Non-conference game. ^{#}Rankings from AP Poll. (#) Tournament seedings in parentheses. All times are in Pacific.
