= 2024–25 UC Irvine Anteaters women's basketball team =

American college basketball season

2024–25 UC Irvine Anteaters women's basketball
- Conference: Big West Conference
- Record: 21–10 (15–5 Big West)
- Head coach: Tamara Inoue (9th season)
- Associate head coach: Cecilia Russell-Nava
- Assistant coaches: Derek Wynn; Tyler Ellis; Fabrice Sene; Ramia Griffin
- Home arena: Bren Events Center

2024–25 Big West women's basketball standings
| | Conf. | | | | Overall |
| Team | W | | L | PCT | W | | L | PCT |
|---|---|---|---|---|---|---|---|---|
| Hawai'i | 16 | – | 4 | .800 | 22 | – | 10 | .688 |
| UC Irvine | 15 | – | 5 | .750 | 21 | – | 10 | .677 |
| UC Davis | 13 | – | 7 | .650 | 21 | – | 12 | .636 |
| UC San Diego † | 13 | – | 7 | .650 | 20 | – | 16 | .556 |
| UC Santa Barbara | 12 | – | 8 | .600 | 18 | – | 13 | .581 |
| Long Beach State | 12 | – | 8 | .600 | 16 | – | 14 | .533 |
| UC Riverside | 12 | – | 8 | .600 | 17 | – | 15 | .531 |
| Cal Poly | 8 | – | 12 | .400 | 14 | – | 18 | .438 |
| Cal State Fullerton | 5 | – | 15 | .250 | 7 | – | 23 | .233 |
| Cal State Bakersfield | 2 | – | 18 | .100 | 2 | – | 28 | .067 |
| Cal State Northridge | 2 | – | 18 | .100 | 4 | – | 25 | .138 |
† 2025 Big West tournament winner

The 2024–25 UC Irvine Anteaters women's basketball team represented the University of California, Irvine during the 2024–25 NCAA Division I women's basketball season. The Anteaters, led by ninth-year head coach Tamara Inoue, played their home games at the Bren Events Center in Irvine, California as members of the Big West Conference.

== Previous season ==
The Anteaters finished the 2023–24 season 23–9, 16–4 in Big West play, to finish in second place. They defeated Long Beach State, and UC Davis to win the Big West tournament championship, to earn the conference's automatic bid to the NCAA tournament, and just their second ever trip to the tournament, and their first since 1995. They received the #13 seed in the Portland Regional 4, where they would fall to #4 region seed Gonzaga in the first round.

== Roster ==
2024–25 UC Irvine Anteaters women's basketball team
Players
Coaches

| Pos. | # | Name | Height | Year | Previous school | Hometown |
|---|---|---|---|---|---|---|
| PG | 1 | Jaida Brooks | 5 ft 6 in (1.68 m) | So | Mesa Community College | Phoenix, AZ |
| G | 2 | Haley Hernandez | 5 ft 11 in (1.8 m) | So | Archbishop Mitty High School | San Jose, CA |
| G | 3 | Nikki Tom | 5 ft 9 in (1.75 m) | Sr | Clovis West High School | Fresno, CA |
| G | 5 | Kimiko Kennedy | 6 ft 0 in (1.83 m) | Fr | Lynwood High School | Los Angeles, CA |
| F | 9 | Daniela Falcón Hernández | 6 ft 2 in (1.88 m) | RS Fr | Utah | Las Palmas, Spain |
| G | 10 | Lauryn Madsen | 5 ft 11 in (1.8 m) | Fr | Warden High School | Warden, WA |
| G | 11 | Amelia Scharpf | 6 ft 0 in (1.83 m) | Sr | Archbishop Mitty High School | San Jose, CA |
| PG | 12 | Shirel Nahum | 5 ft 9 in (1.75 m) | So | Wingate Academy | Ra'anana, Israel |
| PG | 13 | Déja Lee | 5 ft 9 in (1.75 m) | Sr | Semiahmoo Secondary School | Surrey, BC |
| F | 14 | Summah Hanson | 6 ft 3 in (1.91 m) | So | Sacramento State | Brisbane, Australia |
| G | 20 | Hunter Hernandez | 5 ft 9 in (1.75 m) | Jr | Archbishop Mitty High School | San Jose, CA |
| G | 21 | Olivia Williams | 6 ft 1 in (1.85 m) | Jr | Archbishop Mitty High School | South San Francisco, CA |
| F | 22 | Clara Djoko | 6 ft 0 in (1.83 m) | So | Lycée Marcelin-Berthelot | Entzheim, France |
| F | 24 | Nevaeh Dean | 6 ft 2 in (1.88 m) | GS | Cincinnati | Hamilton, OH |
| G | 33 | Ines Gnahore | 5 ft 9 in (1.75 m) | Jr | Salt Lake Community College | Orléans, France |
| G | 35 | Reese Noa | 5 ft 9 in (1.75 m) | Fr | North Torrance High School | Harbor City, CA |

Head coach

- Tamara Inoue (Long Beach State)

Assistant coach(es)

- Cecilia Russell-Nava (New Mexico State)
- Derek Wynn (Cal State Fullerton)
- Tyler Ellis (New Mexico State)
- Fabrice Sene (Orléans)
- Ramia Griffin (Vanguard)

Legend

- (C) Team captain
- (S) Suspended
- (I) Ineligible
- (W) Walk-on
- Injured
- Current redshirt

Roster
Last update: January 20, 2025

== Schedule and results ==
| Date time, TV | Rank^{#} | Opponent^{#} | Result | Record | High points | High rebounds | High assists | Site (attendance) city, state |
Regular season
| November 4, 2024*; 5:30 pm, ESPN+ | | New Mexico State | L 49–57 | 0–1 | 16 – Hanson | 7 – Hernandez | 7 – Tom | Bren Events Center (511); Irvine, CA |
| November 7, 2024*; 11:00 am, ESPN+ | | Pepperdine | W 65–56 | 1–1 | 14 – Hanson | 9 – Hanson | 6 – Lee | Bren Events Center (1,867); Irvine, CA |
| November 11, 2024*; 2:00 pm, ESPN+ | | William & Mary | W 72–55 | 2–1 | 29 – Hernandez | 7 – Williams | 6 – Lee | Bren Events Center (583); Irvine, CA |
| November 16, 2024*; 2:00 pm, ESPN+ | | Saint Mary's | W 64–61 | 3–1 | 15 – Hernandez | 6 – Dean | 4 – Hernandez | Bren Events Center (548); Irvine, CA |
| November 20, 2024*; 3:00 pm, FloHoops | | at Drexel | W 57–47 | 4–1 | 15 – Lee | 9 – Hanson | 4 – Lee | Daskalakis Athletic Center (430); Philadelphia, PA |
| November 21, 2024*; 3:00 pm, ESPN+ | | at Penn | W 72–68 ^{OT} | 5–1 | 20 – tied | 10 – Hanson | 4 – Lee | The Palestra (203); Philadelphia, PA |
| November 27, 2024*; 6:00 pm, MWN | | at New Mexico | L 62–65 | 5–2 | 20 – Lee | 8 – Scharpf | 6 – Tom | The Pit (4,669); Albuquerque, NM |
| November 30, 2024*; 12:00 pm, SLN | | at Denver | L 50–60 | 5–3 | 19 – Hanson | 9 – Hanson | 3 – Dean | Hamilton Gymnasium (339); Denver, CO |
| December 5, 2024; 6:30 pm, ESPN+ | | at Cal State Bakersfield | W 65–40 | 6–3 (1–0) | 12 – tied | 9 – Lee | 3 – Brooks | Icardo Center (320); Bakersfield, CA |
| December 15, 2024*; 1:00 pm, ESPN+ | | at Oregon State | W 60–48 | 7–3 | 11 – tied | 7 – Williams | 4 – Lee | Gill Coliseum (3,451); Corvallis, OR |
| December 19, 2024*; 6:00 pm, B1G+ | | at Oregon | L 43–71 | 7–4 | 9 – Hernandez | 6 – tied | 2 – tied | Matthew Knight Arena (4,508); Eugene, OR |
| January 2, 2025; 6:00 pm, ESPN+ | | Cal Poly | W 60–38 | 8–4 (2–0) | 18 – Hernandez | 7 – Hernandez | 4 – tied | Bren Events Center (792); Irvine, CA |
| January 4, 2025; 4:00 pm, ESPN+ | | at UC Riverside | L 54–59 | 8–5 (2–1) | 15 – Lee | 9 – Hernandez | 4 – Lee | SRC Arena (178); Riverside, CA |
| January 9, 2025; 6:00 pm, ESPN+ | | Cal State Northridge | W 68–39 | 9–5 (3–1) | 15 – Lee | 5 – tied | 4 – tied | Bren Events Center (632); Irvine, CA |
| January 11, 2025; 2:00 pm, ESPN+ | | UC San Diego | W 73–66 | 10–5 (4–1) | 15 – Hanson | 7 – Dean | 4 – tied | Bren Events Center (877); Irvine, CA |
| January 16, 2025; 7:00 pm, ESPN+ | | at Cal State Fullerton | W 79–63 | 11–5 (5–1) | 16 – Hernandez | 6 – tied | 3 – Tom | Titan Gym (123); Fullerton, CA |
| January 18, 2025; 2:00 pm, ESPN+ | | at Cal Poly | W 59–57 | 12–5 (6–1) | 18 – Hernandez | 10 – Hernandez | 2 – tied | Mott Athletics Center (531); San Luis Obispo, CA |
| January 23, 2025; 6:00 pm, ESPN+ | | UC Riverside | W 56-53 | 13-5 (7-1) | 12 – Williams | 8 – Hanson | 5 – Lee | Bren Events Center (460); Irvine, CA |
| January 25, 2025; 9:00 pm, ESPN+ | | at Hawai'i | L 42-46 | 13-6 (7-2) | 13 – Lee | 7 – Hanson | 4 – Tom | Stan Sheriff Center (3,695); Honolulu, HI |
| January 30, 2025; 6:00 pm, ESPN+ | | Long Beach State; Black and Blue Rivalry | W 61-47 | 14-6 (8-2) | 16 – Hernandez | 11 – Hernandez | 3 – Scharpf | Bren Events Center (672); Irvine, CA |
| February 1, 2025; 2:00 pm, ESPN+ | | at UC Davis | W 52-49 | 15-6 (9-2) | 13 – Hernandez | 9 – Hanson | 2 – Lee | University Credit Union Center (867); Davis, CA |
| February 8, 2025; 2:00 pm, ESPN+ | | at UC San Diego | W 56-49 | 16-6 (10-2) | 15 – Hernandez | 10 – Dean | 4 – Scharpf | LionTree Arena (853); La Jolla, CA |
| February 13, 2025; 7:00 pm, ESPN+ | | at UC Santa Barbara | L 52-62 | 16-7 (10-3) | 16 – Lee | 8 – Lee | 4 – Tom | The Thunderdome (533); Santa Barbara, CA |
| February 15, 2025; 2:00 pm, ESPN+ | | Hawai'i | L 44-49 | 16-8 (10-4) | 8 – Hernandez | 6 – Tom | 3 – Lee | Bren Events Center (949); Irvine, CA |
| February 20, 2025; 6:00 pm, ESPN+ | | at Cal State Northridge | W 100-56 | 17-8 (11-4) | 18 – Nahum | 7 – Hanson | 7 – Lee | Premier America Credit Union Arena (270); Northridge, CA |
| February 22, 2025; 2:00 pm, ESPN+ | | Cal State Bakersfield | W 60-49 | 18-8 (12-4) | 15 – Lee | 7 – Hernandez | 3 – Tom | Bren Events Center (617); Irvine, CA |
| February 27, 2025; 6:00 pm, ESPN+ | | Cal State Fullerton | W 62-34 | 19-8 (13-4) | 13 – Hanson | 10 – Hanson | 5 – Scharpf | Bren Events Center (945); Irvine, CA |
| March 1, 2025; 1:00 pm, SSN/ESPN+ | | at Long Beach State | L 52-73 | 19-9 (13-5) | 14 – Hernandez | 6 – Tom | 4 – Lee | Walter Pyramid (958); Long Beach, CA |
| March 6, 2025; 6:00 pm, ESPN+ | | UC Davis | W 55-53 | 20-9 (14-5) | 12 – Hernandez | 8 – Hanson | 6 – Lee | Bren Events Center (679); Irvine, CA |
| March 8, 2025; 1:00 pm, ESPN+ | | UC Santa Barbara; Senior Night | W 62-49 | 21-9 (15-5) | 13 – Lee | 8 – Hernandez | 5 – Lee | Bren Events Center (730); Irvine, CA |
Big West tournament
| March 14, 2025; 2:30 pm, ESPN+ | (2) | vs. (3) UC Davis; Semifinals | L 56-63 | 21-10 | 15 – Hernandez | 8 – Dean | 5 – Tom | Lee's Family Forum (1,627); Henderson, NV |
*Non-conference game. ^{#}Rankings from AP poll. (#) Tournament seedings in parentheses. All times are in Pacific.
