= 2025 Big West Conference women's basketball tournament =

American college basketball postseason tournament

- Classification: Division I
- Season: 2024–25
- Teams: 8
- Site: Lee's Family Forum; Henderson, Nevada
- Champions: UC San Diego (1st title)
- Winning coach: Heidi VanDerveer (1st title)
- MVP: Sumayah Sugapong (UC San Diego)
- Television: ESPN+

2024–25 Big West women's basketball standings
	Conf.				Overall
Team	W		L	PCT	W		L	PCT
Hawai'i	16	–	4	.800	22	–	10	.688
UC Irvine	15	–	5	.750	21	–	10	.677
UC Davis	13	–	7	.650	21	–	12	.636
UC San Diego †	13	–	7	.650	20	–	16	.556
UC Santa Barbara	12	–	8	.600	18	–	13	.581
Long Beach State	12	–	8	.600	16	–	14	.533
UC Riverside	12	–	8	.600	17	–	15	.531
Cal Poly	8	–	12	.400	14	–	18	.438
Cal State Fullerton	5	–	15	.250	7	–	23	.233
Cal State Bakersfield	2	–	18	.100	2	–	28	.067
Cal State Northridge	2	–	18	.100	4	–	25	.138
† 2025 Big West tournament winner

The 2025 Big West Conference women's basketball tournament was the postseason women's basketball tournament for the Big West Conference of the 2024–25 NCAA Division I women's basketball season. It was held March 12–15, 2025, at the Lee's Family Forum in Henderson, Nevada. The winner received the conference's automatic bid to the 2025 NCAA tournament.

UC San Diego defeated UC Davis in the championship game 75–66, their first Big West championship since joining the conference in 2020. They advanced to the NCAA Division I tournament in their first year of eligibility, completing their four-year transition to Division I sports.

== Seeds ==
In this format, the top two seeds receive automatic berths in the semifinals, the following two seeds are placed in the quarterfinals, and the remaining four seeds play each other in the first round. Big West commissioner Dan Butterly stated that the decision was made to improve the regular season champions odds of winning the tournament and thus receiving the automatic bid to the NCAA tournament.

Of the 11 conference teams, all 11 are eligible for tournament spots. UC San Diego is eligible for the first time, as it is the first year after their four-year transition required for teams transferring to Division I from Division II. Teams are seeded based on their performance within the conference, and teams with identical conference records are seeded using a tiebreaker system.

As has been the case since 2020, reseeding teams do not occur at any point.

Seed	School	Record	Tiebreaker
1	Hawai'i	16–4	
2	UC Irvine	15–5	
3	UC Davis	13–7	0–2 vs. UC Irvine, 1–1 vs. Hawai'i
4	UC San Diego	13–7	0–2 vs. UC Irvine, 0–2 vs. Hawai'i
5	UC Santa Barbara	12–8	1–1 vs. UCSD
6	Long Beach State	12–8	0–2 vs. UCSD, 2–0 vs. UCR
7	UC Riverside	12–8	0–2 vs. UCSD, 0–2 vs. LBSU
8	Cal Poly	8–12	
DNQ	Cal State Fullerton	5–15	
DNQ	Cal State Bakersfield	2–18	1–1 vs. CSUN, 1–1 vs. UCR
DNQ	Cal State Northridge	2–18	1–1 vs. CSUB, 0–2 vs. UCR

== Schedule and results ==
Game	Time	Matchup	Score	Television
First round – Wednesday, March 12
1	Noon	No. 5 UC Santa Barbara vs. No. 8 Cal Poly	54–56	ESPN+
2	2:30 p.m.	No. 6 Long Beach State vs. No. 7 UC Riverside	40–54	ESPN+
Quarterfinals – Thursday, March 13
3	Noon	No. 4 UC San Diego vs. No. 8 Cal Poly	59–54	ESPN+
4	2:30 p.m.	No. 3 UC Davis vs. No. 7 UC Riverside	61–50	ESPN+
Semifinals – Friday, March 14
5	Noon	No. 1 Hawai'i vs. No. 4 UC San Diego	49–51	ESPN+
6	2:30 p.m.	No. 2 UC Irvine vs. No. 3 UC Davis	56–63	ESPN+
Final – Saturday, March 15
7	3:00 p.m.	No. 4 UC San Diego vs. No. 3 UC Davis	75–66	ESPN+
*Game times in PDT. Rankings denote tournament seed.

== Bracket ==
First Round; Wednesday, March 12
5	UC Santa Barbara	54
8	Cal Poly	56
6	Long Beach State	40
7	UC Riverside	54

Quarterfinals; Thursday, March 13
4	UC San Diego	59
8	Cal Poly	54
3	UC Davis	61
7	UC Riverside	50

Semifinals; Friday, March 14
1	Hawai'i	49
4	UC San Diego	51
2	UC Irvine	56
3	UC Davis	63

Championship; Saturday, March 15
4	UC San Diego	75
3	UC Davis	66

== See also ==
2025 Big West Conference men's basketball tournament
