= 2024–25 Cal State Fullerton Titans women's basketball team =

American college basketball season

2024–25 Cal State Fullerton Titans women's basketball
- Conference: Big West Conference
- Record: 7–23 (5–15 Big West)
- Head coach: Jeff Harada (8th season)
- Assistant coaches: Nick Milan; Chelsea Stocks; Cassandra Lacey
- Home arena: Titan Gym

2024–25 Big West women's basketball standings
| | Conf. | | | | Overall |
| Team | W | | L | PCT | W | | L | PCT |
|---|---|---|---|---|---|---|---|---|
| Hawai'i | 16 | – | 4 | .800 | 22 | – | 10 | .688 |
| UC Irvine | 15 | – | 5 | .750 | 21 | – | 10 | .677 |
| UC Davis | 13 | – | 7 | .650 | 21 | – | 12 | .636 |
| UC San Diego † | 13 | – | 7 | .650 | 20 | – | 16 | .556 |
| UC Santa Barbara | 12 | – | 8 | .600 | 18 | – | 13 | .581 |
| Long Beach State | 12 | – | 8 | .600 | 16 | – | 14 | .533 |
| UC Riverside | 12 | – | 8 | .600 | 17 | – | 15 | .531 |
| Cal Poly | 8 | – | 12 | .400 | 14 | – | 18 | .438 |
| Cal State Fullerton | 5 | – | 15 | .250 | 7 | – | 23 | .233 |
| Cal State Bakersfield | 2 | – | 18 | .100 | 2 | – | 28 | .067 |
| Cal State Northridge | 2 | – | 18 | .100 | 4 | – | 25 | .138 |
† 2025 Big West tournament winner

The 2024–25 Cal State Fullerton Titans women's basketball team represented California State University, Fullerton during the 2024–25 NCAA Division I women's basketball season. The Titans were led by eighth-year head coach Jeff Harada, and played their home games at Titan Gym in Fullerton, California as a member of the Big West Conference.

The Titans finished the season with a 7–23 record, 5–15 in Big West play, to finish in ninth place.

== Previous season ==
The Titans finished the 2023–24 season 6–14, 10–21 in Big West play, to finish in ninth place. As the ninth seed in the 2024 Big West tournament they lost to fifth seed UC Davis 81–56.

== Roster ==
2024–25 Cal State Fullerton Titans women's basketball team
Players
Coaches

| Pos. | # | Name | Height | Year | Previous school | Hometown |
|---|---|---|---|---|---|---|
| F/C | 0 | Layla Davis | 6 ft 0 in (1.83 m) | Fr | Village Christian School | Lancaster, CA |
| G/F | 1 | Genna Wienecke | 5 ft 10 in (1.78 m) | So | Xavier College Prep High School | Palm Springs, CA |
| G | 2 | Maddy Tauro | 5 ft 7 in (1.7 m) | Fr | Calabasas High School | Calabasas, CA |
| G | 3 | Kaliana Salazar-Harrell | 5 ft 6 in (1.68 m) | RS So | Konawaena High School | Kailua-Kona, HI |
| G | 4 | Jana Falsdottir | 5 ft 4 in (1.63 m) | Fr | Verzlunarskoli Island Gymnasium | Keflavik, Iceland |
| G | 10 | Demonnie Lagway | 5 ft 10 in (1.78 m) | Jr | Palisades Charter High School | Los Angeles, CA |
| F/C | 12 | Eva Levingston | 6 ft 0 in (1.83 m) | So | Piedmont High School | Oakland, CA |
| F/C | 13 | Aixchel Hernandez | 6 ft 1 in (1.85 m) | Sr | Orangewood Academy | Chihuahua, Mexico |
| G | 22 | Madelynn Muniz | 5 ft 9 in (1.75 m) | RS Fr | Idaho | Phoenix, AZ |
| G | 23 | Emily Strachan | 5 ft 7 in (1.7 m) | Sr | Central Maine Community College | Lewiston, ME |
| G | 24 | Aaliyah Stanton | 5 ft 3 in (1.6 m) | So | UTEP | San Diego, CA |
| G/F | 55 | Samantha Schuler | 5 ft 10 in (1.78 m) | Fr | Whitney High School | Rocklin, CA |

Head coach

- Jeff Harada (Colorado)

Assistant coach(es)

- Nick Milan (Cal State Fullerton)
- Chelsea Stocks (Washington State)
- Cassandra Lacey (Redlands)

Legend

- (C) Team captain
- (S) Suspended
- (I) Ineligible
- (W) Walk-on
- Injured
- Current redshirt

Roster
Last update: November 1, 2024

== Schedule and results ==
| Date time, TV | Rank^{#} | Opponent^{#} | Result | Record | High points | High rebounds | High assists | Site (attendance) city, state |
Exhibition
| October 29, 2024*; 7:00 p.m. | | Concordia–Irvine | W 86–57 | | – | – | – | Titan Gym; Fullerton, CA |
Regular season
| November 4, 2024*; 6:00 p.m. | | at Pepperdine | L 57–59 | 0–1 | 13 – Stanton | 10 – Hernandez | 5 – Stanton | Firestone Fieldhouse (220); Malibu, CA |
| November 8, 2024*; 3:30 p.m. | | at Fordham | L 51–66 | 0–2 | 13 – Hernandez | 11 – Hernandez | 4 – Stanton | Rose Hill Gymnasium (364); The Bronx, NY |
| November 10, 2024*; 10:00 a.m. | | at LIU | L 52–63 | 0–3 | 13 – Muniz | 12 – Hernandez | 3 – 2 tied | Steinberg Wellness Center (121); Brooklyn, NY |
| November 14, 2024*; 7:00 p.m., ESPN+ | | Sacramento State | L 40–67 | 0–4 | 11 – Lagway | 10 – Hernandez | 1 – 3 tied | Titan Gym (266); Fullerton, CA |
| November 21, 2024*; 12:00 p.m., B1G+ | | at Washington | L 58–62 | 0–5 | 13 – Lagway | 7 – 2 tied | 4 – Hernandez | Hec Edmundson Pavilion (1,575); Seattle, WA |
| November 24, 2024*; 1:00 p.m., ESPN+ | | at Portland State | L 52–61 | 0–6 | 17 – Stanton | 10 – Levingston | 2 – Falsdottir | Viking Pavilion (385); Portland, OR |
| November 27, 2024*; 1:30 p.m., ESPN+ | | at Loyola Marymount | L 61–64 | 0–7 | 18 – Lagway | 9 – Levingston | 3 – Falsdottir | Gersten Pavilion (209); Los Angeles, CA |
| December 5, 2024; 6:00 p.m., ESPN+ | | at Long Beach State | L 56–67 | 0–8 (0–1) | 21 – Stanton | 10 – 2 tied | 3 – 2 tied | Walter Pyramid (779); Long Beach, CA |
| December 7, 2024; 2:00 p.m., ESPN+ | | UC Riverside | L 59–65 | 0–9 (0–2) | 16 – Hernandez | 6 – 2 tied | 3 – Falsdottir | Titan Gym (161); Fullerton, CA |
| December 11, 2024*; 6:00 p.m., ESPN+ | | San Diego State | L 58–61 | 0–10 | 12 – 3 tied | 11 – 2 tied | 2 – 3 tied | Titan Gym (234); Fullerton, CA |
| December 14, 2024*; 2:00 p.m., ESPN+ | | Chapman | W 80–39 | 1–10 | 18 – Stanton | 17 – Levingston | 4 – Tauro | Titan Gym (129); Fullerton, CA |
| December 29, 2024*; 2:00 p.m., ESPN+ | | Bethesda | W 100–40 | 2–10 | 18 – Stanton | 11 – Hernandez | 4 – 2 tied | Titan Gym (139); Fullerton, CA |
| January 2, 2025; 6:00 p.m., ESPN+ | | at Cal State Northridge | L 76–79 ^{OT} | 2–11 (0–3) | 18 – Stanton | 10 – Levingston | 4 – Lagway | Premier America Credit Union Arena (200); Northridge, CA |
| January 4, 2025; 2:00 p.m., ESPN+ | | at UC San Diego | L 45–57 | 2–12 (0–4) | 12 – Stanton | 11 – Levingston | 3 – Falsdottir | LionTree Arena (392); La Jolla, CA |
| January 9, 2025; 7:00 p.m., ESPN+ | | UC Davis | L 54–80 | 2–13 (0–5) | 24 – Stanton | 7 – Hernandez | 2 – Lagway | Titan Gym (153); Fullerton, CA |
| January 11, 2025; 9:00 p.m., ESPN+ | | at Hawaii | L 44–54 | 2–14 (0–6) | 18 – Stanton | 5 – 2 tied | 3 – Stanton | Stan Sheriff Center (1,951); Manoa, HI |
| January 16, 2025; 7:00 p.m., ESPN+ | | UC Irvine | L 63–79 | 2–15 (0–7) | 17 – Stanton | 9 – Levingston | 3 – 2 tied | Titan Gym (123); Fullerton, CA |
| January 18, 2025; 2:00 p.m., ESPN+ | | Long Beach State | L 60–72 | 2–16 (0–8) | 16 – Stanton | 10 – Levingston | 4 – Strachan | Titan Gym (193); Fullerton, CA |
| January 23, 2025; 6:30 p.m., ESPN+ | | at Cal State Bakersfield | W 63–58 | 3–16 (1–8) | 18 – Stanton | 12 – Levingston | 2 – 2 tied | Icardo Center (581); Bakersfield, CA |
| January 25, 2025; 4:00 p.m., ESPN+ | | at UC Santa Barbara | W 64–61 | 4–16 (2–8) | 19 – Stanton | 6 – Hernandez | 3 – 2 tied | The Thunderdome (612); Santa Barbara, CA |
| February 1, 2025; 2:00 p.m., ESPN+ | | Hawaii | L 47–54 | 5–16 (2–9) | 10 – Hernandez | 11 – Hernandez | 2 – 2 tied | Titan Gym (307); Fullerton, CA |
| February 6, 2025; 7:00 p.m., ESPN+ | | Cal State Northridge | W 65–61 | 5–17 (3–9) | 24 – Strachan | 10 – Levingston | 3 – Stanton | Titan Gym (96); Fullerton, CA |
| February 8, 2025; 2:00 p.m., ESPN+ | | at UC Davis | L 54–71 | 5–18 (3–10) | 12 – Stanton | 5 – 2 tied | 5 – Stanton | University Credit Union Center (907); Davis, CA |
| February 13, 2025; 6:00 p.m., ESPN+ | | at Cal Poly | W 67–64 | 6–18 (4–10) | 20 – Stanton | 10 – Levingston | 2 – Stanton | Mott Athletics Center (368); San Luis Obispo, CA |
| February 15, 2025; 2:00 p.m., ESPN+ | | Cal State Bakersfield | W 78–68 | 7–18 (5–10) | 18 – 2 tied | 10 – Levingston | 4 – Levingston | Titan Gym (215); Fullerton, CA |
| February 20, 2025; 7:00 p.m., ESPN+ | | UC Santa Barbara | L 56–80 | 7–19 (5–11) | 16 – Levingston | 6 – Hernandez | 2 – 3 tied | Titan Gym (143); Fullerton, CA |
| February 27, 2025; 6:00 p.m., ESPN+ | | at UC Irvine | L 34–62 | 7–20 (5–12) | 8 – Lagway | 6 – Hernandez | 2 – 3 tied | Bren Events Center (945); Irvine, CA |
| March 1, 2025; 2:00 p.m., ESPN+ | | UC San Diego | L 46–69 | 7–21 (5–13) | 18 – Stanton | 8 – Levingston | 2 – 3 tied | Titan Gym (135); Fullerton, CA |
| March 6, 2025; 7:00 p.m., ESPN+ | | Cal Poly | L 62–68 | 7–22 (5–14) | 20 – Stanton | 9 – Levingston | 3 – 2 tied | Titan Gym (177); Fullerton, CA |
| March 8, 2025; 4:00 p.m., ESPN+ | | at UC Riverside | L 51–61 | 7–23 (5–15) | 17 – Levingston | 11 – Hernandez | 4 – Hernandez | SRC Arena (197); Riverside, CA |
*Non-conference game. ^{#}Rankings from AP poll. (#) Tournament seedings in parentheses. All times are in Pacific.
