= 2024–25 Pacific Tigers women's basketball team =

American college basketball season

2024–25 Pacific Tigers women's basketball

WNIT, First round
- Conference: West Coast Conference
- Record: 15–19 (9–11 WCC)
- Head coach: Bradley Davis (10th season)
- Associate head coach: Amy Starr
- Assistant coaches: Amanda Brown; Jovana Subasic; Valerie Higgins
- Home arena: Alex G. Spanos Center

2024–25 West Coast Conference women's basketball standings
	Conf.				Overall
Team	W		L	PCT	W		L	PCT
Gonzaga	17	–	3	.850	24	–	11	.686
Portland	17	–	3	.850	31	–	5	.861
Washington State	14	–	6	.700	21	–	14	.600
Oregon State †	12	–	8	.600	19	–	16	.543
San Francisco	11	–	9	.550	15	–	16	.484
Saint Mary's	10	–	10	.500	14	–	17	.452
Pacific	9	–	11	.450	15	–	19	.441
Santa Clara	8	–	12	.400	14	–	17	.452
Loyola Marymount	7	–	13	.350	14	–	16	.467
Pepperdine	3	–	17	.150	8	–	22	.267
San Diego	2	–	18	.100	7	–	24	.226
† 2025 WCC tournament winner

The 2024–25 Pacific Tigers women's basketball team represented University of the Pacific in the 2024–25 NCAA Division I women's basketball season. The Tigers, led by tenth-year head coach Bradley Davis, are members of the West Coast Conference (WCC) and played their home games at the Alex G. Spanos Center in Stockton, California.

== Previous season ==
The Tigers finished the 2022–23 season 19–15, 8–8 in WCC play, to finish in fifth place. As the No. 5 seed in the WCC tournament, they defeated San Diego in the second round and San Francisco in the quarterfinals before losing in the semifinals to Gonzaga. They received an at-large bid to the WNIT where they defeated Cal Poly in the first round before losing in the second round to Minnesota.

== Offseason ==
=== Departures ===
Pacific departures
Name	Num	Pos.	Height	Year	Hometown	Reason for departure
Endigo Parker	00	C	6' 4"	Junior	Fullerton, CA	Named student assistant for Pacific
Kadie Deaton	1	G	5' 11"	Senior	Wausau, WI	Graduated
Josephine Millard	2	G	6' 2"	Graduate student	Nancy, France	Graduated
Rosie Schweizer	4	F	6' 1"	(redshirt) Senior	Canberra, Australia	Transferred to Idaho
Cecilia Homberg	11	F	6' 2"	Graduate student	Bjärred, Sweden	Graduated
Madelene Ennis	33	F	5' 11"	Graduate student	Burlingame, CA	Graduated

=== Incoming ===
Pacific incoming transfers
Name	Num	Pos.	Height	Year	Hometown	Previous school
Marina Radocaj	9	G/F	6' 2"	Sophomore	Richmond, BC	Arizona State
Luisa Anderegg	11	F	6' 2"	Junior	Cologne, Germany	Midland College

==== Recruiting ====
There was no recruiting class of 2024.

== Roster ==
2024–25 Pacific Tigers women's basketball team
Players
Coaches

Pos.	#	Name	Height	Year	Previous school	Hometown
G	3	Anaya James	5 ft 9 in (1.75 m)	Sr	West	Inglewood, CA
G	5	Stella Szabo	5 ft 11 in (1.8 m)	RS Fr	Luleå Gymnasieskola	Stockholm, Sweden
G/F	9	Marina Radocaj	6 ft 3 in (1.91 m)	So	R.A. McMath Secondary School; Arizona State	Richmond, BC
G	10	Sydney Ward	6 ft 0 in (1.83 m)	Jr	The Village	Houston, TX
F	11	Luisa Anderegg	6 ft 2 in (1.88 m)	Jr	Midland College	Cologne, Germany
G	12	Kailey Neave	6 ft 2 in (1.88 m)	Fr	Caulfield Grammar School; Dandenong Rangers	Botanic Ridge, Australia
C	14	Elizabeth Elliott	6 ft 1 in (1.85 m)	Sr	St. Mary's Academy (CA)	Inglewood, CA
G	15	Nyah Lowery	5 ft 11 in (1.8 m)	So	St. Mary's Parish School	Sacramento, CA
G	21	Daria Nestorov	5 ft 4 in (1.63 m)	Fr	Gymnasium Kraljevo	Zrenjanin, Serbia
F	22	Jamie Kent	6 ft 0 in (1.83 m)	So	Carondelet	Dublin, CA
G	23	Kenlee Durrill	5 ft 10 in (1.78 m)	So	Flatirons Academy	Denver, CO
G	24	Liz Smith	5 ft 9 in (1.75 m)	GS	IMG Academy	Dallas, TX
F	25	Lauren Glazier	6 ft 4 in (1.93 m)	Jr	Mount Si; Washington State	North Bend, WA
F	32	Tyla Fautua	6 ft 0 in (1.83 m)	Fr	Southern Districts Spartans	Brisbane, Australia
F	41	Alva Lindvall	6 ft 2 in (1.88 m)	Fr	Hagagymnasiet	Bjärred, Sweden

Head coach

- Bradley Davis (California)

Assistant coach(es)

- Amy Starr (Washington State)
- Amanda Brown (Gonzaga)
- Jovana Subasic (Oregon State)
- Valerie Higgins (Pacific)

Legend

- (C) Team captain
- (S) Suspended
- (I) Ineligible
- (W) Walk-on
- Injured
- Current redshirt

Roster
Last update: February 23, 2025

== Schedule and results ==
Date time, TV	Rank^{#}	Opponent^{#}	Result	Record	High points	High rebounds	High assists	Site (attendance) city, state
Regular season
November 4, 2024*; 11:00 a.m., ESPN+		Stanislaus State	W 87–47	1–0	14 – Elliott	7 – Elliott	8 – 2 tied	Alex G. Spanos Center (2,505); Stockton, CA
November 7, 2024*; 6:00 p.m., B1G+		at Washington	L 50–81	1–1	13 – Elliott	9 – Elliott	6 – James	Alaska Airlines Arena (1,717); Seattle, WA
November 15, 2024*; 6:00 p.m., ESPN+		Long Beach State	W 81–65	2–1	20 – Glazier	10 – James	7 – James	Alex G. Spanos Center (551); Stockton, CA
November 17, 2024*; 2:00 p.m., ESPN+		Northern Arizona	L 63–68	2–2	24 – Smith	15 – Ward	6 – Nestorov	Alex G. Spanos Center (522); Stockton, CA
November 20, 2024*; 4:00 p.m., ESPN+		at Columbia	L 50–84	2–3	13 – Smith	5 – Elliott	4 – Smith	Levien Gymnasium (742); New York, NY
November 24, 2024*; 9:00 a.m., ESPN+		at Yale	W 60–50	3–3	16 – Smith	6 – 2 tied	8 – James	John J. Lee Amphitheater (427); New Haven, CT
November 29, 2024*; 1:30 p.m., YouTube		vs. Lamar; Big Easy Classic Bayou Tournament	L 54–69	3–4	14 – Glazier	9 – Ward	4 – 2 tied	Alario Center (167); Westwego, LA
November 30, 2024*; 1:30 p.m., YouTube		vs. Houston; Big Easy Classic Bayou Tournament	W 64–60	4–4	26 – Elliott	9 – Elliott	7 – 2 tied	Alario Center (214); Westwego, LA
December 5, 2024; 6:00 p.m., ESPN+		Oregon State	W 66–63 ^{OT}	5–4 (1–0)	22 – James	7 – Elliott	10 – Smith	Alex G. Spanos Center (511); Stockton, CA
December 7, 2024*; 2:00 p.m., ESPN+		California	L 66–74	5–5	21 – Smith	10 – Elliott	7 – James	Alex G. Spanos Center (819); Stockton, CA
December 15, 2024*; 2:00 p.m., ESPN+		at UC Santa Barbara	L 50–63	5–6	16 – Elliott	7 – Elliott	4 – Smith	The Thunderdome (444); Santa Barbara, CA
December 21, 2024; 3:30 p.m., ESPN+		at Portland	L 71–84	5–7 (1–1)	24 – Elliott	11 – James	7 – James	Chiles Center (623); Portland, OR
December 28, 2024; 2:00 p.m., ESPN+		Saint Mary's	L 78–80 ^{OT}	5–8 (1–2)	30 – Smith	12 – Elliott	7 – James	Alex G. Spanos Center (1,027); Stockton, CA
December 30, 2024; 12:00 p.m., ESPN+		Washington State	L 66–74	5–9 (1–3)	17 – Smith	11 – Ward	4 – Ward	Alex G. Spanos Center (540); Stockton, CA
January 4, 2025; 2:00 p.m., ESPN+		at San Diego	W 72–66	6–9 (2–3)	20 – Elliott	10 – Elliott	5 – 2 tied	Jenny Craig Pavilion (173); San Diego, CA
January 9, 2025; 6:00 p.m., ESPN+		Santa Clara	W 75–64	7–9 (3–3)	19 – James	10 – Elliott	6 – Smith	Alex G. Spanos Center (614); Stockton, CA
January 11, 2025; 5:00 p.m., ESPN+		at Saint Mary's	L 44–64	7–10 (3–4)	13 – James	9 – Radocaj	5 – James	University Credit Union Pavilion (411); Moraga, CA
January 16, 2025; 6:00 p.m., ESPN+		Loyola Marymount	W 62–51	8–10 (4–4)	15 – 2 tied	9 – Kent	9 – James	Alex G. Spanos Center (537); Stockton, CA
January 18, 2025; 2:00 p.m., ESPN+		San Francisco	W 76–64	9–10 (5–4)	19 – James	6 – 2 tied	5 – 2 tied	Alex G. Spanos Center (594); Stockton, CA
January 23, 2025; 6:00 p.m., ESPN+		at Pepperdine	W 58–43	10–10 (6–4)	15 – James	9 – Ward	4 – James	Firestone Fieldhouse (165); Malibu, CA
January 25, 2025; 6:00 p.m., ESPN+		Oregon State	W 67–66 ^{OT}	11–10 (7–4)	24 – James	9 – Kent	4 – James	Alex G. Spanos Center (615); Stockton, CA
January 30, 2025; 6:00 p.m., ESPN+		at Washington State	L 70–82	11–11 (7–5)	19 – James	8 – Ward	3 – 2 tied	Beasley Coliseum (1,034); Pullman, WA
February 1, 2025; 2:00 p.m., ESPN+		at Gonzaga	L 64–68	11–12 (7–6)	19 – Eliott	10 – Ward	7 – James	McCarthey Athletic Center (5,328); Spokane, WA
February 6, 2025; 6:00 p.m., ESPN+		at Santa Clara	L 58–69	11–13 (7–7)	18 – Smith	8 – Smith	5 – James	Leavey Center (335); Santa Clara, CA
February 8, 2025; 1:00 p.m., ESPN+		Pepperdine	W 68–41	12–13 (8–7)	15 – James	13 – Kent	6 – James	Alex G. Spanos Center (581); Stockton, CA
February 13, 2025; 6:00 p.m., ESPN+		San Diego	L 72–75 ^{OT}	12–14 (8–8)	23 – Elliott	11 – Elliott	5 – Smith	Alex G. Spanos Center (567); Stockton, CA
February 15, 2025; 2:00 p.m., ESPN+		at San Francisco	L 67–90	12–15 (8–9)	18 – Smith	9 – Elliott	3 – James	Sobrato Center (245); San Francisco, CA
February 20, 2025; 6:00 p.m., ESPN+		at Loyola Marymount	W 63–49	13–15 (9–9)	18 – Elliott	9 – Elliott	6 – James	Gersten Pavilion (219); Los Angeles, CA
February 27, 2025; 6:00 p.m., ESPN+		Gonzaga	L 56–72	13–16 (9–10)	10 – 2 tied	5 – Smith	3 – Smith	Alex G. Spanos Center (689); Stockton, CA
March 1, 2025; 1:00 p.m., ESPN+		Portland	L 88–94 ^{OT}	13–17 (9–11)	19 – Smith	7 – Glazier	7 – James	Alex G. Spanos Center (640); Stockton, CA
WCC women's tournament
March 7, 2025; 2:30 p.m., ESPN+	(7)	vs. (11) San Diego; Second Round	W 64–52	14–17	19 – Smith	10 – Ward	4 – James	Orleans Arena (1,030); Paradise, NV
March 8, 2025; 2:30 p.m., ESPN+	(7)	vs. (6) Saint Mary's; Third Round	W 74–59	15–17	21 – Elliott	9 – Radocaj	5 – James	Orleans Arena (1,258); Paradise, NV
March 9, 2025; 2:00 p.m., ESPN+	(7)	vs. (3) Washington State; Quarterfinals	L 62–73	15–18	30 – James	8 – Ward	8 – Smith	Orleans Arena (1,505); Paradise, NV
WNIT
March 20, 2025*; 6:00 p.m., ESPN+		New Mexico State; First Round	L 49–54	15–19	16 – Elliot	6 – 2 tied	4 – James	Alex G. Spanos Center (516); Stockton, CA
*Non-conference game. ^{#}Rankings from AP poll. (#) Tournament seedings in parentheses. All times are in Pacific.

== See also ==
- 2024–25 Pacific Tigers men's basketball team
