= 2024–25 Loyola Marymount Lions women's basketball team =

American college basketball season

2024–25 Loyola Marymount Lions women's basketball
- Conference: West Coast Conference
- Record: 14–16 (7–13 WCC)
- Head coach: Aarika Hughes (4th season)
- Associate head coach: Brooke Atkinson
- Assistant coaches: Lauren Unger; Jody Burrows; Brad Johnson; Amanda Delgado
- Home arena: Gersten Pavilion

2024–25 West Coast Conference women's basketball standings
	Conf.				Overall
Team	W		L	PCT	W		L	PCT
Gonzaga	17	–	3	.850	24	–	11	.686
Portland	17	–	3	.850	31	–	5	.861
Washington State	14	–	6	.700	21	–	14	.600
Oregon State †	12	–	8	.600	19	–	16	.543
San Francisco	11	–	9	.550	15	–	16	.484
Saint Mary's	10	–	10	.500	14	–	17	.452
Pacific	9	–	11	.450	15	–	19	.441
Santa Clara	8	–	12	.400	14	–	17	.452
Loyola Marymount	7	–	13	.350	14	–	16	.467
Pepperdine	3	–	17	.150	8	–	22	.267
San Diego	2	–	18	.100	7	–	24	.226
† 2025 WCC tournament winner

The 2024–25 Loyola Marymount Lions women's basketball team represented the Loyola Marymount University in the 2024–25 NCAA Division I women's basketball season. The Lions, led by fourth-year coach Aarika Hughes, played their homes games at Gersten Pavilion and are members of the West Coast Conference.

== Previous season ==
The Lions finished the 2023–24 season 7–23, 4–14 in WCC play to finish in seventh place. As the No. 7 seed in the WCC tournament, they defeated to Saint Mary's in the first round before losing to Portland in the quarterfinals.

== Offseason ==
=== Departures ===
Loyola Marymount departures
Name	Num	Pos.	Height	Year	Hometown	Reason for departure
Da'Ja Hamilton	0	G	5'8"	Graduate student	Rancho Cucamonga, CA	Graduated
Ella Wedin	3	G	6'1"	Freshman	Happy Valley, OR	Transferred to Saint Mary's
Cynthia Ezeja	4	F	6'2"	(redshirt) Senior	Athens, Greece	Graduated
Daylee Dunn	5	G	5'10"	Senior	Fresno, CA	Transferred to Cincinnati
Amaya Oliver	10	F	6'2"	Senior	Richmond, CA	Transferred to Temple
Soufia Inoussa	11	G	5'8"	Senior	Stockholm, Sweden	Graduated
Sydney Gandy	14	G	5'8"	Senior	Long Beach, CA	Transferred to Southern Utah
Nicole Rodriguez	17	G	5'8"	Senior	Eastvale, CA	Transferred to SMU
Noelle Yancy	21	G	5'10"	Senior	Dallas, TX	Graduated
Alexis Mark	35	F	5'11"	Senior	Chatsworth, CA	Transferred to Portland

=== Incoming ===
Loyola Marymount incoming transfers
Name	Num	Pos.	Height	Year	Hometown	Previous school
Brandi Williams	0	G	5'6"	Graduate student	Lake Charles, LA	Louisiana
Carly Heidger	5	G	6'3"	(redshirt) Junior	Dacula, GA	Samford
Naudia Evans	7	G	5'6"	Senior	Waynesville, MO	Grand Canyon
Ali'a Matavao	11	F	6'0"	Sophomore	Las Vegas, NV	BYU
Lexi Boles	25	F/C	6'3"	Senior	Des Moines, IA	Illinois State
Paula Reus	30	F	6'1"	Senior	Palma de Mallorca, Spain	New Mexico

==== Recruiting ====
There was no recruiting class of 2024.

== Roster ==
2024–25 Loyola Marymount Lions women's basketball team
Players
Coaches

Pos.	#	Name	Height	Year	Previous school	Hometown
G	0	Brandi Williams	5 ft 6 in (1.68 m)	GS	Barbe; Louisiana	Lake Charles, LA
G	2	Mari Somvichian	5 ft 4 in (1.63 m)	So	Oakland Tech	Oakland, CA
G	3	Madison Watts	5 ft 10 in (1.78 m)	Fr	Leuzinger	San Pedro, CA
G	4	Allison Clarke	5 ft 11 in (1.8 m)	Fr	Rosary Academy	Anaheim, CA
G	5	Carly Heidger	6 ft 3 in (1.91 m)	RS So	Hebron Christian Academy; Samford	Dacula, GA
G	7	Naudia Evans	5 ft 6 in (1.68 m)	Sr	Waynesville; Grand Canyon	Waynesville, MO
G/F	10	Amelie Sitterud	6 ft 1 in (1.85 m)	So	Tahoma	Kirkland, WA
F	11	Ali'a Matavao	6 ft 0 in (1.83 m)	So	Liberty; BYU	Las Vegas, NV
F	22	Ava Toone	6 ft 1 in (1.85 m)	Sr	IMG Academy	Brooklyn, NY
G	23	Layla Curry	5 ft 9 in (1.75 m)	Jr	Centennial	Corona, CA
F/C	25	Lexi Boles	6 ft 3 in (1.91 m)	Sr	Dowling Catholic; Illinois State	Des Moines, IA
F	26	Aniyah Riddell	6 ft 1 in (1.85 m)	Fr	Desert Vista	Phoenix, AZ
F	30	Paula Reus Piza	6 ft 1 in (1.85 m)	Sr	IES Joaquim Blume; New Mexico	Palma de Mallorca, Spain
G	54	Zawadi Ogot	5 ft 11 in (1.8 m)	Fr	Santiago	Upland, CA
F	55	Maya Hernandez	6 ft 0 in (1.83 m)	So	Archbishop Mitty	San Jose, CA

Head coach

- Aarika Hughes (USC)

Assistant coach(es)

- Brooke Atkinson (Wichita State)
- Lauren Unger (UT Permian Basin)
- Jody Burrows (Northeastern)
- Brad Johnson
- Amanda Delgado (Oregon)

Legend

- (C) Team captain
- (S) Suspended
- (I) Ineligible
- (W) Walk-on
- Injured
- Current redshirt

Roster

== Schedule and results ==
Date time, TV	Rank^{#}	Opponent^{#}	Result	Record	High points	High rebounds	High assists	Site (attendance) city, state
Non-conference regular season
November 4, 2024*; 6:30 p.m., MW Network		at UNLV	L 57–73	0–1	14 – Williams	7 – Reus Piza	4 – Tied	Cox Pavilion; Paradise, NV
November 9, 2024*; 2:00 p.m., ESPN+		Bethesda	W 101–43	1–1	23 – Hernandez	12 – Matavao	11 – Evans	Gersten Pavilion (278); Los Angeles, CA
November 13, 2024*; 5:00 p.m., SLN		at South Dakota	W 71–67 ^{OT}	2–1	33 – Hernandez	10 – Tied	8 – Evans	Sanford Coyote Sports Center (1,394); Vermillion, SD
November 22, 2024*; 5:00 p.m., ESPN+		at Utah Valley	W 76–68	3–1	15 – Tied	8 – Evans	12 – Evans	UCCU Center (474); Orem, UT
November 27, 2024*; 1:30 p.m., ESPN+		Cal State Fullerton	W 64–61	4–1	13 – Tied	10 – Hernandez	8 – Evans	Gersten Pavilion (209); Los Angeles, CA
December 4, 2024*; 6:00 p.m., ESPN+		Life Pacific	W 83–43	5–1	12 – Williams	6 – Tied	6 – Evans	Gersten Pavilion (184); Los Angeles, CA
December 7, 2024*; 1:00 p.m., MW Network		at San Jose State	W 82–71	6–1	32 – Evans	5 – Tied	6 – Evans	Provident Credit Union Event Center (288); San Jose, CA
December 15, 2024*; 2:00 p.m., ESPN+		Wichita State	L 56–68	6–2	16 – Hernandez	9 – Hernandez	4 – Evans	Gersten Pavilion (293); Los Angeles, CA
WCC regular season
December 19, 2024; 6:00 p.m., ESPN+		Portland	L 48–83	6–3 (0–1)	21 – Williams	8 – Hernandez	7 – Evans	Gersten Pavilion (219); Los Angeles, CA
December 21, 2024; 2:00 p.m., ESPN+		at Saint Mary's	L 54–59	6–4 (0–2)	16 – Williams	6 – Hernandez	8 – Evans	University Credit Union Pavilion (278); Moraga, CA
December 28, 2024; 2:00 p.m., ESPN+		San Francisco	L 73–85	6–5 (0–3)	25 – Evans	6 – Heidger	7 – Evans	Gersten Pavilion (176); Los Angeles, CA
January 2, 2025; 6:00 p.m., ESPN+		at Oregon State	L 56–59	6–6 (0–4)	17 – Williams	11 – Hernandez	5 – Evans	Gill Coliseum (3,519); Corvallis, OR
January 4, 2025; 3:00 p.m., ESPN+		at Portland	L 61–80	6–7 (0–5)	15 – Heidger	8 – Evans	3 – Tied	Chiles Center (636); Portland, OR
January 16, 2025; 6:00 p.m., ESPN+		at Pacific	L 51–62	6–8 (0–6)	19 – Evans	13 – Hernandez	5 – Evans	Alex G. Spanos Center (537); Stockton, CA
January 18, 2025; 2:00 p.m., ESPN+		Gonzaga	L 58–69	6–9 (0–7)	28 – Evans	7 – Hernandez	2 – Tied	Gersten Pavilion (301); Los Angeles, CA
January 20, 2025; 2:00 p.m., ESPN+		San Diego; Rescheduled from January 9	W 55–52	7–9 (1–7)	15 – Tied	8 – Hernandez	7 – Evans	Gersten Pavilion (182); Los Angeles, CA
January 23, 2025; 6:00 p.m., ESPN+		Santa Clara	L 60–67	7–10 (1–8)	18 – Williams	10 – Hernandez	5 – Evans	Gersten Pavilion (191); Los Angeles, CA
January 25, 2025; 2:00 p.m., ESPN+		Washington State	W 79–76	8–10 (2–8)	37 – Evans	7 – Tied	4 – Evans	Gersten Pavilion (313); Los Angeles, CA
January 28, 2025; 4:00 p.m., ESPN+		at Pepperdine; Rescheduled from January 11	L 43–55	8–11 (2–9)	12 – Clarke	8 – Hernandez	3 – Williams	Firestone Fieldhouse; Malibu, CA
January 30, 2025; 6:00 p.m., ESPN+		at San Francisco	W 73–68	9–11 (3–9)	29 – Evans	7 – Hernandez	5 – Evans	Sobrato Center; San Francisco, CA
February 6, 2025; 6:00 p.m., ESPN+		Oregon State	L 49–66	9–12 (3–10)	19 – Williams	9 – Hernandez	8 – Evans	Gersten Pavilion (287); Los Angeles, CA
February 8, 2025; 12:00 p.m., ESPN+		at Santa Clara	W 69–62	10–12 (4–10)	24 – Williams	6 – Heidger	9 – Evans	Leavey Center (660); Santa Clara, CA
February 13, 2025; 6:00 p.m., ESPN+		at Washington State	L 51–63	10–13 (4–11)	20 – Evans	8 – Hernandez	4 – Evans	Beasley Coliseum (890); Pullman, WA
February 15, 2025; 1:00 p.m., ESPN+		at Gonzaga	L 57–69	10–14 (4–12)	14 – Williams	6 – Williams	5 – Evans	McCarthey Athletic Center (6,000); Spokane, WA
February 20, 2025; 6:00 p.m., ESPN+		Pacific	L 49–63	10–15 (4–13)	14 – Williams	7 – Hernandez	6 – Evans	Gersten Pavilion (219); Los Angeles, CA
February 22, 2025; 2:00 p.m., ESPN+		Pepperdine	W 58–49	11–15 (5–13)	11 – Evans	9 – Heidger	5 – Evans	Gersten Pavilion (233); Los Angeles, CA
February 27, 2025; 6:00 p.m., ESPN+		at San Diego	W 63–60	12–15 (6–13)	15 – Hernandez	6 – Hernandez	7 – Evans	Jenny Craig Pavilion (296); San Diego, CA
March 1, 2025; 4:00 p.m., ESPN+		Saint Mary's	W 65–61	13–15 (7–13)	18 – Tied	15 – Hernandez	9 – Evans	Gersten Pavilion (289); Los Angeles, CA
WCC women's tournament
March 7, 2025; 12:00 p.m., ESPN+	(9)	vs. (8) Santa Clara; Second Round	W 66–52	14–15	22 – Williams	14 – Hernandez	4 – Evans	Orleans Arena (828); Paradise, NV
March 8, 2025; 12:00 p.m., ESPN+	(9)	vs. (5) San Francisco; Third Round	L 66–75	14–16	18 – Evans	7 – Hernandez	5 – Hernandez	Orleans Arena (975); Paradise, NV
*Non-conference game. ^{#}Rankings from AP Poll. (#) Tournament seedings in parentheses. All times are in Pacific Time.

== See also ==
- 2024–25 Loyola Marymount Lions men's basketball team
