= 2024–25 Oregon State Beavers women's basketball team =

American college basketball season

2024–25 Oregon State Beavers women's basketball

WCC tournament champions

NCAA tournament, First Round
- Conference: West Coast Conference
- Record: 19–16 (12–8 WCC)
- Head coach: Scott Rueck (15th season)
- Assistant coaches: Deven Hunter; Sydney Wiese
- Home arena: Gill Coliseum

2024–25 West Coast Conference women's basketball standings
	Conf.				Overall
Team	W		L	PCT	W		L	PCT
Gonzaga	17	–	3	.850	24	–	11	.686
Portland	17	–	3	.850	31	–	5	.861
Washington State	14	–	6	.700	21	–	14	.600
Oregon State †	12	–	8	.600	19	–	16	.543
San Francisco	11	–	9	.550	15	–	16	.484
Saint Mary's	10	–	10	.500	14	–	17	.452
Pacific	9	–	11	.450	15	–	19	.441
Santa Clara	8	–	12	.400	14	–	17	.452
Loyola Marymount	7	–	13	.350	14	–	16	.467
Pepperdine	3	–	17	.150	8	–	22	.267
San Diego	2	–	18	.100	7	–	24	.226
† 2025 WCC tournament winner

The 2024–25 Oregon State Beavers women's basketball team represented Oregon State University during the 2024–25 NCAA Division I women's basketball season. The Beavers were led by fifteenth-year head coach Scott Rueck, and played their games at Gill Coliseum in Corvallis, Oregon as associate first-year members of the West Coast Conference (WCC).

== Previous season ==
The Beavers finished the 2023–24 season 27–8, 12–6 in Pac-12 play, to finish in fourth place. As the No. 4 seed in the Pac-12 tournament, they defeated Colorado in the quarterfinals before losing to Stanford in the semifinals. They received an at-large bid to the NCAA tournament as a No. 3 seed in the Albany Regional 1, where they defeated Eastern Washington and Nebraska in the first and second rounds, to advance to the Sweet Sixteen for the first time since 2019, where they defeated Notre Dame to advance to the Elite Eight for the first time since 2018. There, they lost to national champion South Carolina.

== Offseason ==
=== Departures ===
Oregon State departures
Name	Num	Pos.	Height	Year	Hometown	Reason for departure
Lily Hanford	2	G	6' 2"	Sophomore	DePere, WI	Transferred to Iowa State
Dominika Paurová	3	G	6' 1"	Freshman	Mladá Boleslav, Czech Republic	Transferred to Kentucky
Donovyn Hunter	4	G	6' 0"	Freshman	Medford, OR	Transferred to TCU
Raegan Beers	15	F	6' 4"	Sophomore	Littleton, CO	Transferred to Oklahoma
Talia von Oelfoffen	22	G	5' 11"	Junior	Pasco, WA	Transferred to USC
Adlee Blacklock	24	G	6' 0"	Sophomore	Lubbock, TX	Transferred to Texas Tech
Timea Gardiner	30	F	6' 3"	Sophomore	Ogden, UT	Transferred to UCLA
Martha Pietsch	31	G	5' 5"	Sophomore	Berlin, Germany	Transferred to UC Santa Barbara

=== Incoming ===
Oregon State incoming transfers
Name	Num	Pos.	Height	Year	Hometown	Previous school
Tiara Bolden	0	G	5' 11"	Senior	Eugene, OR	La Salle
Lucia Navarro	7	F	6' 0"	Sophomore	Valencia, Spain	Florida State
Mackenzie Shivers	12	G	5' 6"	Junior	Mesa, AZ	Mesa CC
Cartrina Ferreira	30	G	6' 0"	Graduate student	São Paulo, Brazil	Baylor

==== Recruiting ====
There was no recruiting class of 2024.

== Roster ==
2024–25 Oregon State Beavers women's basketball team
Players
Coaches

Pos.	#	Name	Height	Year	Previous school	Hometown
G	0	Tiara Bolden	5 ft 11 in (1.8 m)	Sr	Churchill HS; La Salle	Eugene, OR
G	1	Kennedie Shuler	5 ft 10 in (1.78 m)	So	Barlow HS	Gresham, OR
G	4	Ally Schimel	5 ft 10 in (1.78 m)	Fr	Corbett School	Corbett, OR
F	7	Lucia Navarro	6 ft 0 in (1.83 m)	So	NB Paterna; Florida State	Valencia, Spain
F	10	Susana Yepes	6 ft 0 in (1.83 m)	RS Jr	South Georgia Tech	Medellín, Colombia
G	11	AJ Marotte	6 ft 1 in (1.85 m)	Sr	Vista Ridge HS	Cedar Park, TX
F	16	Elisa Mehyar	6 ft 5 in (1.96 m)	Fr		Copenhagen, Denmark
G	30	Catarina Ferreira	6 ft 0 in (1.83 m)	GS	Baylor	São Paulo, Brazil
G	31	Cloe Vecina	5 ft 8 in (1.73 m)	Fr	Celta Baloncesto Feminino	Vigo, Spain
C	32	Sela Heide	6 ft 7 in (2.01 m)	Sr	Mount Si HS; California	North Bend, WA
F	53	Kelsey Rees	6 ft 5 in (1.96 m)	Sr	Centre of Excellence; Utah	Glenelg, Australia

Head coach

- Scott Rueck (Oregon State)

Assistant coach(es)

- Deven Hunter (Oregon State)
- Sydney Wiese (Oregon State)

Legend

- (C) Team captain
- (S) Suspended
- (I) Ineligible
- (W) Walk-on
- Injured
- Current redshirt

Roster

== Schedule and results ==
Date time, TV	Rank^{#}	Opponent^{#}	Result	Record	High points	High rebounds	High assists	Site (attendance) city, state
Exhibition
November 1, 2024*; 6:00 p.m.		Westmont	W 59–51		–	–	–	Gill Coliseum; Corvallis, OR
Regular season
November 8, 2024*; 4:30 p.m., MW Network		at Colorado State	L 59–65	0–1	16 – Rees	17 – Rees	5 – Shuler	Moby Arena (1,108); Fort Collins, CO
November 12, 2024*; 5:00 p.m., ESPN+		Northwest Nazarene	W 80–52	1–1	26 – Heide	11 – Heide	6 – Marotte	Gill Coliseum (3,479); Corvallis, OR
November 16, 2024*; 12:00 p.m.		vs. Minnesota; Briann January Classic	L 38–73	1–2	9 – Rees	7 – Heide	3 – Marotte	Desert Financial Arena; Tempe, AZ
November 17, 2024*; 1:30 p.m., ESPN+		at Arizona State; Briann January Classic	L 60–79	1–3	22 – Ferreira	11 – Ferreira	6 – Shuler	Desert Financial Arena (1,738); Tempe, AZ
November 22, 2024*; 5:00 p.m., B1G+		at No. 22 Illinois	L 66–85	1–4	16 – Marotte	11 – Ferreira	4 – tied	State Farm Center (3,891); Champaign, IL
November 25, 2024*; 4:30 p.m., FloHoops		vs. No. 2 UConn; Baha Mar Women's Championship semifinals	L 52–71	1–5	17 – Marotte	7 – Rees	4 – tied	Baha Mar Convention Center (567); Nassau, Bahamas
November 27, 2024*; 2:00 p.m., FloHoops		vs. Boston College; Baha Mar Women's Championship 3rd-place game	W 54–49	2–5	21 – Marotte	9 – Rees	4 – Shuler	Baha Mar Convention Center (417); Nassau, Bahamas
December 3, 2024*; 11:00 a.m., ESPN+		Grambling State	W 63–56	3–5	16 – Heide	12 – Heide	3 – Vecina	Gill Coliseum (7,881); Corvallis, OR
December 5, 2024; 6:00 p.m., ESPN+		at Pacific	L 63–66 ^{OT}	3–6 (0–1)	17 – Marotte	8 – Rees	4 – Rees	Alex G. Spanos Center (511); Stockton, CA
December 15, 2024*; 1:00 p.m., ESPN+		UC Irvine	L 48–60	3–7	8 – tied	7 – Ferreira	2 – tied	Gill Coliseum (3,451); Corvallis, OR
December 19, 2024*; 7:00 p.m., YouTube		vs. Western Kentucky; Maui Classic	W 80–58	4–7	26 – Ferreira	11 – Ferreira	4 – Ferreira	Seabury Hall; Makawao, HI
December 20, 2024*; 8:00 p.m., YouTube		vs. Miami (FL); Maui Classic	L 56–61	4–8	19 – Ferreira	9 – Rees	5 – Marotte	Seabury Hall (1,206); Makawao, HI
December 28, 2024; 1:00 p.m., ESPN2		at Gonzaga	W 71–67 ^{OT}	5–8 (1–1)	21 – Rees	9 – Rees	8 – Shuler	McCarthey Athletic Center (5,615); Spokane, WA
December 30, 2024; 6:00 p.m., ESPN+		at Portland	W 76–72 ^{OT}	6–8 (2–1)	25 – Rees	12 – Rees	5 – Shuler	Chiles Center (2,064); Portland, OR
January 2, 2025; 6:00 p.m., ESPN+		Loyola Marymount	W 59–56	7–8 (3–1)	17 – Rees	8 – tied	5 – Marotte	Gill Coliseum (3,519); Corvallis, OR
January 4, 2025; 12:00 p.m., ESPN+		at Washington State	L 52–66	7–9 (3–2)	17 – Rees	11 – Rees	2 – Marotte	Beasley Coliseum (997); Pullman, WA
January 9, 2025; 6:00 p.m., ESPN+		San Francisco	W 64–57	8–9 (4–2)	19 – Bolden	9 – Ferreira	5 – Ferreira	Gill Coliseum (3,651); Corvallis, OR
January 16, 2025; 6:00 p.m., ESPN+		at Santa Clara	W 74–72	9–9 (5–2)	18 – tied	8 – tied	4 – Marotte	Leavey Center (280); Santa Clara, CA
January 18, 2025; 6:00 p.m., ESPN+		Portland	L 61–86	9–10 (5–3)	14 – Rees	8 – Shuler	3 – Bolden	Gill Coliseum (4,695); Corvallis, OR
January 23, 2025; 6:00 p.m., ESPN+		at San Francisco	L 52–54	9–11 (5–4)	13 – Marotte	12 – Ferreira	4 – Ferreira	Sobrato Center (228); San Francisco, CA
January 25, 2025; 6:00 p.m., ESPN+		at Pacific	L 66–67 ^{OT}	9–12 (5–5)	22 – Rees	7 – Ferreira	5 – Ferreira	Alex G. Spanos Center (615); Stockton, CA
January 27, 2025; 7:00 p.m., ESPN+		Washington State	L 57–65	9–13 (5–6)	13 – Ferreira	7 – tied	4 – Bolden	Gill Coliseum (3,844); Corvallis, OR
January 30, 2025; 6:00 p.m., ESPN+		Pepperdine	W 63–54	10–13 (6–6)	13 – Ferreira	14 – Ferreira	4 – Rees	Gill Coliseum (3,729); Corvallis, OR
February 1, 2025; 2:00 p.m., ESPN+		Saint Mary's	W 80–45	11–13 (7–6)	19 – Rees	11 – Ferreira	8 – Shuler	Gill Coliseum (4,121); Corvallis, OR
February 6, 2025; 6:00 p.m., ESPN+		at Loyola Marymount	W 66–49	12–13 (8–6)	16 – Marotte	11 – Ferreira	6 – Shuler	Gersten Pavilion (287); Los Angeles, CA
February 8, 2025; 2:00 p.m., ESPN+		at San Diego	W 58–50	13–13 (9–6)	17 – Rees	8 – Rees	4 – Marotte	Jenny Craig Pavilion (1,689); San Diego, CA
February 13, 2025; 6:00 p.m., ESPN+		Gonzaga	L 62–66 ^{OT}	13–14 (9–7)	18 – Marotte	10 – Ferreira	3 – Shuler	Gill Coliseum (4,574); Corvallis, OR
February 20, 2025; 6:00 p.m., ESPN+		Santa Clara	W 68–51	14–14 (10–7)	18 – Marotte	9 – Heide	7 – Shuler	Gill Coliseum (3,751); Corvallis, OR
February 22, 2025; 2:00 p.m., ESPN+		San Diego	W 64–51	15–14 (11–7)	13 – Bolden	14 – Rees	7 – Shuler	Gill Coliseum (4,745); Corvallis, OR
February 27, 2025; 6:30 p.m., ESPN+		at Saint Mary's	L 66–69	15–15 (11–8)	18 – Rees	7 – tied	10 – Shuler	University Credit Union Pavilion (397); Moraga, CA
March 1, 2025; 1:00 p.m., ESPN+		at Pepperdine	W 73–46	16–15 (12–8)	24 – Rees	8 – Ferreira	4 – Shuler	Firestone Fieldhouse (403); Malibu, CA
WCC women's tournament
March 9, 2025; 11:30 a.m., ESPN+	(4)	vs. (5) San Francisco; Quarterfinals	W 61–59	17–15	19 – Ferreira	7 – tied	3 – tied	Orleans Arena (1,244); Paradise, NV
March 10, 2025; 12:00 p.m., ESPN+	(4)	vs. (1) Gonzaga; Semifinals	W 63–61	18–15	19 – Ferreira	9 – Ferreira	5 – Shuler	Orleans Arena (2,827); Paradise, NV
March 11, 2025; 1:00 p.m., ESPN2	(4)	vs. (2) Portland; Finals	W 59–46	19–15	16 – Ferreira	12 – Ferreira	3 – Rees	Orleans Arena (1,737); Paradise, NV
NCAA tournament
March 22, 2025*; 1:30 p.m., ESPNU	(14 B2)	at (3 B2) No. 12 North Carolina; First Round	L 49–70	19–16	15 – Rees	10 – Rees	7 – Shuler	Carmichael Arena (5,363); Chapel Hill, NC
*Non-conference game. ^{#}Rankings from AP poll. (#) Tournament seedings in parentheses. Birmingham 2=B2. All times are in Pacific.

== Rankings ==
Ranking movements Legend: ██ Increase in ranking ██ Decrease in ranking — = Not ranked RV = Received votes
	Week																				
Poll	Pre	1	2	3	4	5	6	7	8	9	10	11	12	13	14	15	16	17	18	19	Final
AP	—	—	—	—																	
Coaches	RV	RV	—	—																	

== See also ==
- 2024–25 Oregon State Beavers men's basketball team
