= 2024–25 San Francisco Dons women's basketball team =

American college basketball season

2024–25 San Francisco Dons women's basketball
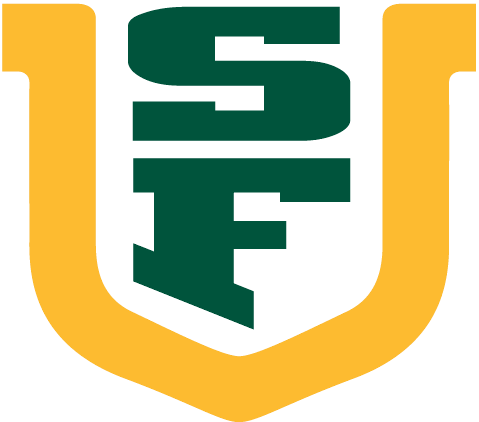
- Conference: West Coast Conference
- Record: 15–16 (11–9 WCC)
- Head coach: Molly Goodenbour (9th season)
- Associate head coach: Janell Jones
- Assistant coaches: Jamie Craighead Turner; Greg Rahn; Isaac Lu; Jasmine Gayles
- Home arena: Sobrato Center

2024–25 West Coast Conference women's basketball standings
| | Conf. | | | | Overall |
| Team | W | | L | PCT | W | | L | PCT |
|---|---|---|---|---|---|---|---|---|
| Gonzaga | 17 | – | 3 | .850 | 24 | – | 11 | .686 |
| Portland | 17 | – | 3 | .850 | 31 | – | 5 | .861 |
| Washington State | 14 | – | 6 | .700 | 21 | – | 14 | .600 |
| Oregon State † | 12 | – | 8 | .600 | 19 | – | 16 | .543 |
| San Francisco | 11 | – | 9 | .550 | 15 | – | 16 | .484 |
| Saint Mary's | 10 | – | 10 | .500 | 14 | – | 17 | .452 |
| Pacific | 9 | – | 11 | .450 | 15 | – | 19 | .441 |
| Santa Clara | 8 | – | 12 | .400 | 14 | – | 17 | .452 |
| Loyola Marymount | 7 | – | 13 | .350 | 14 | – | 16 | .467 |
| Pepperdine | 3 | – | 17 | .150 | 8 | – | 22 | .267 |
| San Diego | 2 | – | 18 | .100 | 7 | – | 24 | .226 |
† 2025 WCC tournament winner

The 2024–25 San Francisco Dons women's basketball team represented the University of San Francisco in the 2024–25 NCAA Division I women's basketball season. They were led by ninth-year head coach Molly Goodenbour. The Dons, as members of the West Coast Conference (WCC), played their home games at the Sobrato Center in San Francisco, California.

== Previous season ==
The Dons finished the 2023–24 season 14–16, 10–6 in WCC play, to finish in a tie for third place. They lost in the quarterfinals of the WCC tournament to Pacific.

== Offseason ==
=== Departures ===
San Francisco departures
| Name | Num | Pos. | Height | Year | Hometown | Reason for departure |
|---|---|---|---|---|---|---|
| Jasmine Gayles | 11 | G | 5'7" | Graduate student | Seattle, WA | Graduated |

=== Incoming ===
San Francisco incoming transfers
| Name | Num | Pos. | Height | Year | Hometown | Previous school |
|---|---|---|---|---|---|---|
| Emma Trawally Porta | 7 | F | 6'1" | Senior | Tiana, Spain | Detroit Mercy |

==== Recruiting ====
There was no recruiting class of 2024.

== Roster ==
2024–25 San Francisco Dons women's basketball team
Players
Coaches

| Pos. | # | Name | Height | Year | Previous school | Hometown |
|---|---|---|---|---|---|---|
| G | 1 | Luana Leite | 5 ft 7 in (1.7 m) | Sr | South Georgia Tech | Porto Feliz, Brazil |
| G | 2 | Kiana Moniz | 5 ft 5 in (1.65 m) | Fr | Sacared Heart Cathedral Prep | San Francisco, CA |
| G | 4 | Elle Papahronis | 5 ft 11 in (1.8 m) | RS Fr | Edmond North | Edmond, OK |
| F | 7 | Emma Trawally Porta | 6 ft 1 in (1.85 m) | Sr | Institut Thalassa; Detroit Mercy | Tiana, Spain |
| F | 10 | Lorena Barbosa | 6 ft 5 in (1.96 m) | RS Sr | Glória Azedia Bonetti | Itatiba, Brazil |
| G | 11 | Angeliki Ziaka | 6 ft 0 in (1.83 m) | Fr | ACS Athens | Athens, Greece |
| G | 12 | Freja Werth | 6 ft 1 in (1.85 m) | Sr | Riksbasketgymansiet Luleå; Albany | Arild, Sweden |
| F | 13 | Debora dos Santos | 6 ft 0 in (1.83 m) | RS Sr | Wasatch Academy; South Plains College | Rio de Janeiro, Brazil |
| F | 14 | Marina Hernandez | 6 ft 2 in (1.88 m) | Jr | Le Fuente San Luis | Alicante, Spain |
| G | 20 | Aya Kéita | 5 ft 9 in (1.75 m) | Sr | Kazinczy Ferenc Grammar School | Győr, Hungary |
| G | 22 | Paula Tirado | 5 ft 7 in (1.7 m) | So | IES Damià Campeny | Mataró, Spain |
| F | 24 | Sol Castro | 6 ft 1 in (1.85 m) | GS | Benito Quinquela Martín; Robert Morris | Río Colorado, Argentina |
| F | 25 | Seynabou Thiam | 6 ft 6 in (1.98 m) | GS | Galandou Diouf HS; Tarleton State | Dakar, Senegal |
| G | 32 | Cami Fulcher | 5 ft 8 in (1.73 m) | Sr | West Linn | West Linn, OR |
| G | 44 | Mia Vukšic | 6 ft 0 in (1.83 m) | Jr | Srednja strukovna škola Kansas | Šibenik, Croatia |

Head coach

- Molly Goodenbour (Stanford)

Assistant coach(es)

- Janell Jones (Oklahoma Christian)
- Jamie Turner (Oregon)
- Greg Rahn (Arkansas State)
- Isaac Lu (San Francisco)
- Jasmine Gayles (San Francisco)

Legend

- (C) Team captain
- (S) Suspended
- (I) Ineligible
- (W) Walk-on
- Injured
- Current redshirt

Roster
Last update: February 16, 2025

== Schedule and results ==
| Date time, TV | Rank^{#} | Opponent^{#} | Result | Record | High points | High rebounds | High assists | Site (attendance) city, state |
Non-conference regular season
| November 4, 2024*; 4:30 p.m., MW Network | | at Colorado State | L 47–52 | 0–1 | 13 – Werth | 9 – 2 tied | 3 – 2 tied | Moby Arena (1,182); Fort Collins, CO |
| November 9, 2024*; 3:30 p.m., ESPN+ | | UC Santa Barbara | W 59–37 | 1–1 | 14 – Dos Santos | 10 – Trawally Porta | 4 – Leite | Sobrato Center (516); San Francisco, CA |
| November 12, 2024*; 6:00 p.m., ESPN+ | | Portland State | W 62–56 | 2–1 | 17 – Dos Santos | 9 – 2 tied | 8 – Leite | Sobrato Center (348); San Francisco, CA |
| November 16, 2024*; 1:00 p.m., MW Network | | at San Diego State | L 62–73 | 2–2 | 15 – Papahronis | 10 – Trawally Porta | 4 – Ziaka | Viejas Arena (990); San Diego, CA |
| November 21, 2024*; 4:00 p.m., ESPN+ | | vs. Boise State; USF Legacy Showcase | L 57–59 | 2–3 | 18 – Werth | 9 – Dos Santos | 4 – Leite | Chase Center (453); San Francisco, CA |
| December 2, 2024*; 4:00 p.m., FloSports | | at Seton Hall | L 53–59 | 2–4 | 15 – Trawally Porta | 9 – Trawally Porta | 5 – 2 tied | Walsh Gymnasium (582); South Orange, NJ |
| December 4, 2024*; 8:00 a.m., ESPN+ | | at Columbia | L 79–81 | 2–5 | 24 – Werth | 10 – Werth | 5 – 2 tied | Levien Gymnasium (2,733); New York, NY |
| December 14, 2024*; 1:00 p.m., ESPN+ | | at Northern Arizona | L 83–92 | 2–6 | 23 – Werth | 8 – Trawally Porta | 8 – Ziaka | Rolle Activity Center (402); Flagstaff, AZ |
| December 17, 2024*; 11:00 a.m., ESPN+ | | Arizona State | W 67–64 | 3–6 | 17 – Dos Santos | 14 – Dos Santos | 3 – Leite | Sobrato Center; San Francisco, CA |
WCC regular season
| December 19, 2024; 6:00 p.m., ESPN+ | | Gonzaga | W 73–58 | 4–6 (1–0) | 18 – Trawally Porta | 8 – Dos Santos | 10 – Leite | Sobrato Center (358); San Francisco, CA |
| December 28, 2024; 2:00 p.m., ESPN+ | | at Loyola Marymount | W 85–73 | 5–6 (2–0) | 21 – Dos Santos | 6 – 2 tied | 5 – Ziaka | Gersten Pavilion (176); Los Angeles, CA |
| December 30, 2024; 6:00 p.m., ESPN+ | | at Santa Clara | W 65–53 | 6–6 (3–0) | 22 – Werth | 10 – Dos Santos | 5 – 2 tied | Leavey Center (241); Santa Clara, CA |
| January 2, 2025; 6:00 p.m., ESPN+ | | Saint Mary's | W 87–73 | 7–6 (4–0) | 22 – Ziaka | 10 – Dos Santos | 13 – Leite | Sobrato Center (294); San Francisco, CA |
| January 4, 2025; 2:00 p.m., ESPN+ | | Pepperdine | W 76–60 | 8–6 (5–0) | 26 – Dos Santos | 8 – Dos Santos | 6 – Ziaka | Sobrato Center (203); San Francisco, CA |
| January 9, 2025; 6:00 p.m., ESPN+ | | at Oregon State | L 57–64 | 8–7 (5–1) | 18 – Werth | 11 – Trawally Porta | 7 – Leite | Gill Coliseum (3,651); Corvallis, OR |
| January 11, 2025; 5:00 p.m., ESPN+ | | at Portland | L 60–74 | 8–8 (5–2) | 20 – Werth | 7 – Leite | 5 – Ziaka | Chiles Center (1,097); Portland, OR |
| January 16, 2025; 6:00 p.m., ESPN+ | | Washington State | L 58–74 | 8–9 (5–3) | 20 – Ziaka | 5 – 2 tied | 2 – 2 tied | Sobrato Center; San Francisco, CA |
| January 18, 2025; 2:00 p.m., ESPN+ | | at Pacific | L 64–76 | 8–10 (5–4) | 24 – Werth | 10 – Werth | 4 – 2 tied | Alex G. Spanos Center (594); Stockton, CA |
| January 23, 2025; 6:00 p.m., ESPN+ | | Oregon State | W 54–52 | 9–10 (6–4) | 20 – Werth | 8 – 2 tied | 9 – Leite | Sobrato Center (228); San Francisco, CA |
| January 25, 2025; 2:00 p.m., ESPN+ | | at San Diego | W 63–56 | 10–10 (7–4) | 26 – Werth | 8 – Trawally Porta | 4 – Ziaka | Jenny Craig Pavilion (270); San Diego, CA |
| January 30, 2025; 6:00 p.m., ESPN+ | | Loyola Marymount | L 68–73 | 10–11 (7–5) | 16 – Trawally Porta | 7 – Werth | 4 – Leite | Sobrato Center; San Francisco, CA |
| February 1, 2025; 2:00 p.m., ESPN+ | | Santa Clara | L 50–59 | 10–12 (7–6) | 18 – Werth | 9 – Papahronis | 3 – Kéita | Sobrato Center; San Francisco, CA |
| February 6, 2025; 6:00 p.m., ESPN+ | | at Pepperdine | W 72–48 | 11–12 (8–6) | 22 – Trawally Porta | 8 – Trawally Porta | 5 – 2 tied | Firestone Fieldhouse (160); Malibu, CA |
| February 8, 2025; 5:00 p.m., ESPN+ | | at Saint Mary's | L 49–52 | 11–13 (8–7) | 17 – Trawally Porta | 6 – 2 tied | 6 – Leite | University Credit Union Pavilion (430); Moraga, CA |
| February 15, 2025; 2:00 p.m., ESPN+ | | Pacific | W 80–67 | 12–13 (9–7) | 18 – Werth | 8 – Werth | 7 – Leite | Sobrato Center (245); San Francisco, CA |
| February 20, 2025; 6:00 p.m., ESPN+ | | at Washington State | L 59–67 | 12–14 (9–8) | 19 – Leite | 9 – Werth | 3 – Ziaka | Beasley Coliseum (1,072); Pullman, WA |
| February 22, 2025; 12:00 p.m., ESPN+ | | at Gonzaga | W 70–68 | 13–14 (10–8) | 19 – Werth | 7 – Werth | 6 – Leite | McCarthey Athletic Center (5,540); Spokane, WA |
| February 27, 2025; 6:00 p.m., ESPN+ | | Portland | L 67–68 | 13–15 (10–9) | 26 – Werth | 7 – Trawally Porta | 6 – Leite | Sobrato Center (305); San Francisco, CA |
| March 1, 2025; 2:00 p.m., ESPN+ | | San Diego | W 60–35 | 14–15 (11–9) | 30 – Werth | 10 – Werth | 6 – Kéita | Sobrato Center; San Francisco, CA |
WCC women's tournament
| March 8, 2025; 12:00 p.m., ESPN+ | (5) | vs. (9) Loyola Marymount; Third Round | W 75–66 | 15–15 | 24 – Werth | 9 – Trawally Porta | 3 – 3 tied | Orleans Arena (975); Paradise, NV |
| March 9, 2025; 11:30 a.m., ESPN+ | (5) | vs. (4) Oregon State; Quarterfinals | L 59–61 | 15–16 | 18 – Werth | 8 – Werth | 3 – 3 tied | Orleans Arena (1,244); Paradise, NV |
*Non-conference game. ^{#}Rankings from AP poll. (#) Tournament seedings in parentheses. All times are in Pacific.

== See also ==
- 2024–25 San Francisco Dons men's basketball team
