= 2025 West Coast Conference women's basketball tournament =

- Classification: Division I
- Season: 2024–25
- Teams: 11
- Site: Orleans Arena; Paradise, Nevada
- Champions: Oregon State
- Winning coach: Scott Rueck (1st title)
- Television: ESPN+, ESPN2

2024–25 West Coast Conference women's basketball standings
	Conf.				Overall
Team	W		L	PCT	W		L	PCT
Gonzaga	17	–	3	.850	24	–	11	.686
Portland	17	–	3	.850	31	–	5	.861
Washington State	14	–	6	.700	21	–	14	.600
Oregon State †	12	–	8	.600	19	–	16	.543
San Francisco	11	–	9	.550	15	–	16	.484
Saint Mary's	10	–	10	.500	14	–	17	.452
Pacific	9	–	11	.450	15	–	19	.441
Santa Clara	8	–	12	.400	14	–	17	.452
Loyola Marymount	7	–	13	.350	14	–	16	.467
Pepperdine	3	–	17	.150	8	–	22	.267
San Diego	2	–	18	.100	7	–	24	.226
† 2025 WCC tournament winner

The 2025 West Coast Conference women's basketball Tournament was the postseason women's basketball tournament for the West Coast Conference for the 2024–25 season. All tournament games were played at Orleans Arena in the Las Vegas-area community of Paradise, Nevada, from March 6–11, 2025. The winner received the conference's automatic bid to the 2025 NCAA tournament.

== Seeds ==
All 11 conference teams participated in the tournament. Teams were seeded by record within the conference, with a tiebreaker system to seed teams with identical conference records. The tiebreakers operated in the following order:

1. Head-to-head record
2. Record against the top-seeded team not involved in the tie, going down through the standings until the tie is broken
3. NET rating after the final regular-season conference games on March 2

Seed	School	Conf. record	Tiebreaker(s)
1	Gonzaga	17–3	2–0 vs Portland
2	Portland	17–3	0–2 vs Gonzaga
3	Washington State	14–6	
4	Oregon State	12–8	
5	San Francisco	11–9	
6	Saint Mary's	10–10	
7	Pacific	9–11	
8	Santa Clara	8–12	
9	Loyola Marymount	7–13	
10	Pepperdine	3–17	
11	San Diego	2–18	

== Schedule and results ==
Game	Time	Matchup	Score	Television
First Round - Thursday, March 6
1	12:00 pm	No. 10 Pepperdine vs. No. 11 San Diego	59–66	ESPN+
Second Round - Friday, March 7
2	12:00 pm	No. 8 Santa Clara vs. No. 9 Loyola Marymount	52–66	ESPN+
3	2:30 pm	No. 7 Pacific vs. No. 11 San Diego	64–52	ESPN+
Third Round – Saturday, March 8
4	12:00 pm	No. 5 San Francisco vs. No. 9 Loyola Marymount	75–66	ESPN+
5	2:30 pm	No. 6 Saint Mary's vs. No. 7 Pacific	59–74	ESPN+
Quarterfinals - Sunday, March 9
6	11:30 am	No. 4 Oregon State vs. No. 5 San Francisco	61–59	ESPN+
7	2:00 pm	No. 3 Washington State vs. No. 7 Pacific	73–62	ESPN+
Semifinals - Monday, March 10
8	12:00 pm	No. 1 Gonzaga vs. No. 4 Oregon State	61–63	ESPN+
9	2:30 pm	No. 2 Portland vs. No. 3 Washington State	72–57	ESPN+
Final – Tuesday, March 11
10	1:00 pm	No. 2 Portland vs. No. 4 Oregon State	46–59	ESPN2
*Game times in PST through the third round and PDT from the quarterfinals onward. Rankings denote tournament seed. Reference:

== Bracket ==
First round Thursday, March 6
10	Pepperdine	59
11	San Diego	66

Second round Friday, March 7
8	Santa Clara	52
9	Loyola Marymount	66
7	Pacific	64
11	San Diego	52

Third round Saturday, March 8
5	San Francisco	75
9	Loyola Marymount	66
6	Saint Mary's	59
7	Pacific	74

Quarterfinals; Sunday, March 9
4	Oregon State	61
5	San Francisco	59
3	Washington State	73
7	Pacific	62

Semifinals; Monday, March 10
1	Gonzaga	61
4	Oregon State	63
2	Portland	72
3	Washington State	57

Championship; Tuesday, March 11
4	Oregon State	59
2	Portland	46
