= 2024–25 San Diego Toreros women's basketball team =

American college basketball season

2024–25 San Diego Toreros women's basketball
- Conference: West Coast Conference
- Record: 7–24 (2–18 WCC)
- Head coach: Cindy Fisher (20th season)
- Associate head coach: Mary Ann Falcosky
- Assistant coaches: Jualeah Woods; Ryan Yablonsky
- Home arena: Jenny Craig Pavilion

2024–25 West Coast Conference women's basketball standings
	Conf.				Overall
Team	W		L	PCT	W		L	PCT
Gonzaga	17	–	3	.850	24	–	11	.686
Portland	17	–	3	.850	31	–	5	.861
Washington State	14	–	6	.700	21	–	14	.600
Oregon State †	12	–	8	.600	19	–	16	.543
San Francisco	11	–	9	.550	15	–	16	.484
Saint Mary's	10	–	10	.500	14	–	17	.452
Pacific	9	–	11	.450	15	–	19	.441
Santa Clara	8	–	12	.400	14	–	17	.452
Loyola Marymount	7	–	13	.350	14	–	16	.467
Pepperdine	3	–	17	.150	8	–	22	.267
San Diego	2	–	18	.100	7	–	24	.226
† 2025 WCC tournament winner

The 2024–25 San Diego Toreros women's basketball team represented the University of San Diego in the 2024–25 NCAA Division I women's basketball season. The Toreros, led by 20th-year head coach Cindy Fisher, played their home games at the Jenny Craig Pavilion in San Diego, California as members of the West Coast Conference (WCC).

== Previous season ==
The Toreros finished the 2023–24 season 9–22, 4–12 in WCC play, to finish in eighth place. As the No. 8 seed in the WCC tournament, they defeated Pepperdine in the first round before losing in the second round to Pacific.

== Offseason ==
=== Departures ===
San Diego departures
Name	Num	Pos.	Height	Year	Hometown	Reason for departure
Veronica Sheffey	2	G	5' 9"	Sophomore	Woodinville, WA	Transferred to San Diego State
Jess Finney	3	G	6' 0"	Junior	Scottsdale, AZ	Transferred to Loyola Chicago
Mila Wawszkowicz	4	G	5' 11"	Freshman	Maitland, Australia	Entered transfer portal
Dylan Horton	10	G	5' 9"	Graduate student	Inglewood, CA	Graduated
Maddie Vejsicky	14	G	6' 0"	Sophomore	New Concord, OH	Transferred to Akron
Melesungu Afeaki	21	F	6' 2"	Sophomore	San Bruno, CA	Transferred to Saint Mary's
Kasey Neubert	22	F	6' 1"	(redshirt) Senior	Elizabeth, CO	Graduated
Harsimran Kaur	23	F	6' 4"	Junior	Kapurthala, India	Transferred to Rhode Island

=== Incoming ===
San Diego incoming transfers
Name	Num	Pos.	Height	Year	Hometown	Previous school
Ava Ranson	0	G	5' 10"	(redshirt) Senior	Boise, ID	Cal State San Marcos
Jayden Rhodes	19	F	5' 11"	Junior	Keller, TX	Morehead State
Hallie Rhodes	20	G	5' 11"	Junior	Keller, TX	Morehead State
Truitt Reilly	21	C	6' 2"	Senior	Silverton, OR	Cal State San Marcos
Paris Santacaterina	22	G	5' 7"	Junior	Mackay, Australia	Dodge City CC

==== Recruiting ====
There was no recruiting class of 2024.

== Roster ==
2024–25 San Diego Toreros women's basketball team
Players
Coaches

Pos.	#	Name	Height	Year	Previous school	Hometown
G	0	Ava Ranson	5 ft 10 in (1.78 m)	RS Sr	Timberline; Cal State San Marcos	Boise, ID
F	1	Dresha Moore	6 ft 0 in (1.83 m)	Fr	Leuzinger	Hawthorne, CA
F	3	Lily Amor	5 ft 11 in (1.8 m)	Fr	Templestowe College	Melbourne, Australia
G	5	Lauren McCall	5 ft 6 in (1.68 m)	So	Timberline	Boise, ID
F	10	Courtney Wristen	6 ft 2 in (1.88 m)	Sr	Broomfield	Broomfield, CO
G	11	Malia Tharpe	6 ft 0 in (1.83 m)	So	Shenton College	Cottesloe, Australia
F	12	Erica Carr	6 ft 3 in (1.91 m)	Fr	South Grand Prairie	Grand Prairie, TX
F	15	Eva Ruse	6 ft 2 in (1.88 m)	Fr	Mulgrave School	North Vancouver, BC
G	19	Jayden Rhodes	5 ft 11 in (1.8 m)	Jr	L. D. Bell; Morehead State	Keller, TX
G	20	Hallie Rhodes	5 ft 11 in (1.8 m)	Jr	L. D. Bell; Morehead State	Keller, TX
F	21	Truitt Reilly	6 ft 2 in (1.88 m)	Sr	Silverton; Cal State San Marcos	Silverton, OR
G	22	Paris Santacaterina	5 ft 7 in (1.7 m)	Jr	St Patrick's College; Dodge City CC	Mackay, Australia
G	24	Kylie Horstmeyer	6 ft 0 in (1.83 m)	Jr	Redwood	Greenbrae, CA
G	30	Claire Gallagher	5 ft 11 in (1.8 m)	RS Sr	King's; Lafayette	Lake Forest Park, WA

Head coach

- Cindy Fisher (Eastern Wyoming College)

Assistant coach(es)

- Mary Ann Falcosky (Northern Arizona)
- Jualeah Woods (USC)
- Ryan Yablonsky (Texas)

Legend

- (C) Team captain
- (S) Suspended
- (I) Ineligible
- (W) Walk-on
- Injured
- Current redshirt

Roster
Last update: January 27, 2025

== Schedule and results ==
Date time, TV	Rank^{#}	Opponent^{#}	Result	Record	High points	High rebounds	High assists	Site (attendance) city, state
Exhibition
November 2, 2024*; 4:00 p.m.		Chapman						Jenny Craig Pavilion; San Diego, CA
Non-conference regular season
November 6, 2024*; 5:30 p.m., ESPN+		Biola	W 75–30	1–0	14 – Ranson	7 – tied	4 – Horstmeyer	Jenny Craig Pavilion (201); San Diego, CA
November 12, 2024*; 5:00 p.m., ESPN+		at Weber State	W 66–63	2–0	15 – Horstmeyer	9 – Reilly	4 – McCall	Dee Events Center (255); Ogden, UT
November 19, 2024*; 6:30 p.m., MW Network		at UNLV	L 54–88	2–1	13 – Ranson	5 – tied	3 – McCall	Cox Pavilion (848); Paradise, NV
November 24, 2024*; 2:00 p.m., ESPN+		at UC Santa Barbara	L 63–71 ^{OT}	2–2	17 – Horstmeyer	11 – Reilly	3 – Ranson	The Thunderdome (592); Santa Barbara, CA
November 29, 2024*; 2:00 p.m., ESPN+		Omaha; USD Thanksgiving Classic	L 66–70	2–3	16 – Horstmeyer	6 – tied	5 – Ranson	Jenny Craig Pavilion (186); San Diego, CA
November 30, 2024*; 4:00 p.m., ESPN+		Alabama A&M; USD Thanksgiving Classic	L 67–78	2–4	15 – Horstmeyer	13 – Wristen	4 – Ranson	Jenny Craig Pavilion (1,012); San Diego, CA
December 5, 2024*; 6:00 p.m., ESPN+		La Sierra	W 76–37	3–4	14 – Reilly	7 – tied	7 – Santacaterina	Jenny Craig Pavilion (128); San Diego, CA
December 8, 2024*; 1:00 p.m., MW Network		at Boise State	L 59–76	3–5	14 – Reilly	7 – Wristen	4 – Ranson	ExtraMile Arena (2,036); Boise, ID
December 14, 2024*; 2:00 p.m., ESPN+		Cal State Northridge	W 74–52	4–5	11 – Ranson	8 – Moore	4 – tied	Jenny Craig Pavilion (1,331); San Diego, CA
WCC regular season
December 19, 2024; 6:00 p.m., ESPN+		Washington State	L 42–65	4–6 (0–1)	10 – Ranson	8 – Horstmeyer	3 – Ranson	Jenny Craig Pavilion (203); San Diego, CA
December 21, 2024; 2:00 p.m., ESPN+		Gonzaga	L 59–66	4–7 (0–2)	13 – Horstmeyer	10 – Wristen	6 – McCall	Jenny Craig Pavilion (754); San Diego, CA
December 30, 2024; 2:00 p.m., ESPN+		at Saint Mary's	L 75–85	4–8 (0–3)	20 – Horstmeyer	6 – Reilly	7 – Ranson	University Credit Union Pavilion (326); Moraga, CA
January 2, 2025; 6:00 p.m., ESPN+		at Pepperdine	L 49–63	4–9 (0–4)	12 – Moore	9 – Moore	3 – McCall	Firestone Fieldhouse (180); Malibu, CA
January 4, 2025; 2:00 p.m., ESPN+		Pacific	L 66–72	4–10 (0–5)	17 – Reilly	11 – Reilly	11 – McCall	Jenny Craig Pavilion (173); San Diego, CA
January 11, 2025; 12:00 p.m., ESPN+		at Santa Clara	L 59–67	4–11 (0–6)	14 – Reilly	9 – Reilly	6 – Ranson	Leavey Center (287); Santa Clara, CA
January 18, 2025; 2:00 p.m., ESPN+		Pepperdine	L 66–68	4–12 (0–7)	13 – tied	10 – tied	6 – Reilly	Jenny Craig Pavilion (151); San Diego, CA
January 20, 2025; 2:00 p.m., ESPN+		at Loyola Marymount; Rescheduled from January 9	L 52–55	4–13 (0–8)	14 – Ranson	14 – Reilly	4 – Ranson	Gersten Pavilion (182); Los Angeles, CA
January 23, 2025; 6:00 p.m., ESPN+		Saint Mary's	L 63–72	4–14 (0–9)	25 – Reilly	8 – Moore	5 – tied	Jenny Craig Pavilion (158); San Diego, CA
January 25, 2025; 2:00 p.m., ESPN+		San Francisco	L 56–63	4–15 (0–10)	15 – Horstmeyer	7 – Moore	5 – Ranson	Jenny Craig Pavilion (270); San Diego, CA
January 30, 2025; 6:00 p.m., ESPN+		at Gonzaga	L 48–64	4–16 (0–11)	10 – Ranson	4 – tied	3 – Rhodes	McCarthey Athletic Center (5,006); Spokane, WA
February 1, 2025; 12:00 p.m., ESPN+		at Washington State	L 60–67	4–17 (0–12)	17 – Reilly	12 – Reilly	2 – Horstmeyer	Beasley Coliseum (1,203); Pullman, WA
February 6, 2025; 6:00 p.m., ESPN+		Portland	L 64–66	4–18 (0–13)	19 – Horstmeyer	12 – Reilly	4 – Ranson	Jenny Craig Pavilion (142); San Diego, CA
February 8, 2025; 2:00 p.m., ESPN+		Oregon State	L 50–58	4–19 (0–14)	16 – Reilly	5 – Reilly	4 – Reilly	Jenny Craig Pavilion (1,689); San Diego, CA
February 13, 2025; 6:00 p.m., ESPN+		at Pacific	W 75–72 ^{OT}	5–19 (1–14)	26 – Horstmeyer	9 – H. Rhodes	10 – Ranson	Alex G. Spanos Center (567); Stockton, CA
February 15, 2025; 2:00 p.m., ESPN+		Santa Clara	W 63–57	6–19 (2–14)	20 – Horstmeyer	18 – Reilly	3 – tied	Jenny Craig Pavilion (560); San Diego, CA
February 20, 2025; 6:00 p.m., ESPN+		at Portland	L 65–81	6–20 (2–15)	30 – Horstmeyer	7 – Reilly	5 – H. Rhodes	Chiles Center (756); Portland, OR
February 22, 2025; 2:00 p.m., ESPN+		at Oregon State	L 51–64	6–21 (2–16)	13 – Reilly	7 – Reilly	2 – tied	Gill Coliseum (4,745); Corvallis, OR
February 27, 2025; 6:00 p.m., ESPN+		Loyola Marymount	L 60–63	6–22 (2–17)	16 – Reilly	13 – Reilly	6 – Rhodes	Jenny Craig Pavilion (296); San Diego, CA
March 1, 2025; 2:00 p.m., ESPN+		at San Francisco	L 35–60	6–23 (2–18)	10 – Moore	9 – Moore	4 – Ranson	Sobrato Center; San Francisco, CA
WCC women's tournament
March 6, 2025; 12:00 p.m., ESPN+	(11)	vs. (10) Pepperdine; First Round	W 66–59	7–23	20 – tied	13 – Reilly	8 – Ranson	Orleans Arena; Paradise, NV
March 7, 2025; 2:30 p.m., ESPN+	(11)	vs. (7) Pacific; Second Round	L 52–64	7–24	18 – Rhodes	9 – Reilly	3 – Ranson	Orleans Arena (1,030); Paradise, NV
*Non-conference game. ^{#}Rankings from AP poll. (#) Tournament seedings in parentheses. All times are in Pacific.

== See also ==
- 2024–25 San Diego Toreros men's basketball team
