= 2024–25 Portland Pilots women's basketball team =

American college basketball season

2024–25 Portland Pilots women's basketball
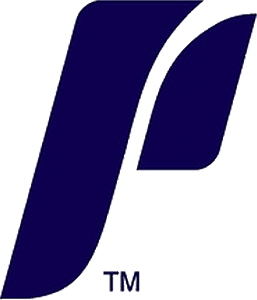

WCC regular season co-champions

WBIT, quarterfinals
- Conference: West Coast Conference
- Record: 31–5 (17–3 WCC)
- Head coach: Michael Meek (6th season)
- Assistant coaches: Tom Batsell; Sharon Rissmiller; Jerod Gibson7; Kianna Hamilton
- Home arena: Chiles Center

2024–25 West Coast Conference women's basketball standings
	Conf.				Overall
Team	W		L	PCT	W		L	PCT
Gonzaga	17	–	3	.850	24	–	11	.686
Portland	17	–	3	.850	31	–	5	.861
Washington State	14	–	6	.700	21	–	14	.600
Oregon State †	12	–	8	.600	19	–	16	.543
San Francisco	11	–	9	.550	15	–	16	.484
Saint Mary's	10	–	10	.500	14	–	17	.452
Pacific	9	–	11	.450	15	–	19	.441
Santa Clara	8	–	12	.400	14	–	17	.452
Loyola Marymount	7	–	13	.350	14	–	16	.467
Pepperdine	3	–	17	.150	8	–	22	.267
San Diego	2	–	18	.100	7	–	24	.226
† 2025 WCC tournament winner

The 2024–25 Portland Pilots women's basketball team represented the University of Portland in the 2024–25 NCAA Division I women's basketball season. The Pilots were led by sixth-year coach Michael Meek. They played their home games at Chiles Center and are members of the West Coast Conference.

The team achieved its best start in program history.

== Previous season ==
The Pilots finished the season 21–13, 10–6 in WCC play to finish in 3rd place. As the No. 3 seed in the WCC Tournament, they defeated Loyola Marymount in the quarterfinals, Santa Clara in the semifinals and Gonzaga in the championship to win the WCC Tournament. They received an automatic bid to the NCAA Tournament, where as the No. 13 seed in the Albany 2 region, they were beaten in the first round by Kansas State.

== Offseason ==
=== Departures ===
Portland departures
Name	Num	Pos.	Height	Year	Hometown	Reason for departure
Kennedy Dickie	12	F	6'0"	Graduate student	Kelowna, BC	Graduated
Kianna Hamilton	25	G	6'0"	(redshirt) Senior	Woodland Hills, CA	Graduated
Lucy Cochrane	30	F	6'6"	Senior	Melbourne, Australia	Graduated
Piath Gabriel	36	C	6'5"	Senior	Manchester, NH	Graduated

=== Incoming ===
Portland incoming transfers
Name	Num	Pos.	Height	Year	Hometown	Previous school
Trista Hull	16	F	6'2"	Senior	Yakima, WA	Boise State
Alexis Mark	35	F	5'11"	Graduate student	Chatsworth, CA	Loyola Marymount

==== Recruiting ====
There was no recruiting class of 2024.

== Roster ==
2024–25 Portland Pilots women's basketball team
Players
Coaches

Pos.	#	Name	Height	Year	Previous school	Hometown
G	1	McKelle Meek	5 ft 7 in (1.7 m)	Sr	Southridge	Beaverton, OR
F	2	Dyani Ananiev	6 ft 2 in (1.88 m)	So	Wyndham	St. Andrews, Australia
G	3	Florence Dallow	6 ft 2 in (1.88 m)	RS So	Epsom Girls'	Beaverton, OR
G	4	Melika Samia	5 ft 9 in (1.75 m)	RS So	Mount Maunganui College	Napier, New Zealand
G	5	Emme Shearer	6 ft 0 in (1.83 m)	Sr	Westlake Girls	Auckland, New Zealand
G	7	Tiffany Barbosa	5 ft 10 in (1.78 m)	Fr	RIG Luleå	Stockholm, Sweden
G	10	Natalie Fraley	6 ft 0 in (1.83 m)	Jr	Kelso; Utah State	Kelso, WA
G	11	Emma Strelein	5 ft 11 in (1.8 m)	RS Jr	Kennedy Baptist	Perth, Australia
G	14	Caitlin Monahan	5 ft 10 in (1.78 m)	Fr	Mercer Island	Mercer Island, WA
F/C	16	Trista Hull	6 ft 2 in (1.88 m)	Jr	La Salle; Boise State	Yakima, WA
F	20	Lainey Spear	6 ft 2 in (1.88 m)	So	Beaverton	Beaverton, OR
G	21	Anna Eddy	5 ft 9 in (1.75 m)	RS Sr	St. Mary's Academy; Seattle Pacific	Portland, OR
G	22	Rhyan Mogel	5 ft 10 in (1.78 m)	So	Clackamas	Happy Valley, OR
G	24	Maisie Burnham	6 ft 0 in (1.83 m)	Sr	Liberty HS; Eastern Washington	Spangle, WA
F/C	42	Ella Zimmerman	6 ft 4 in (1.93 m)	Fr	Redondo Union	Redondo Beach, CA

Head coach

- Michael Meek (Eastern Oregon)

Assistant coach(es)

- Tom Batsell (Pacific)
- Sharon Rissmiller (Portland)
- Jerod Gibson (Portland State)
- Kianna Hamilton (Portland)

Legend

- (C) Team captain
- (S) Suspended
- (I) Ineligible
- (W) Walk-on
- Injured
- Current redshirt

Roster

== Schedule and results ==
Date time, TV	Rank^{#}	Opponent^{#}	Result	Record	High points	High rebounds	High assists	Site (attendance) city, state
Exhibition
November 1, 2024*; 6:00 p.m.		Willamette	W 93–44		18 – Burnham	5 – Mark	8 – Meek	Chiles Center (334); Portland, OR
Non-conference regular season
November 7, 2024*; 6:00 p.m., KRCW/ESPN+		Hawaii	W 76–65	1–0	18 – Burnham	6 – Tied	4 – Tied	Chiles Center (512); Portland, OR
November 12, 2024*; 6:00 p.m., ESPN+		Corban	W 108–41	2–0	17 – Mark	7 – Mark	7 – Meek	Chiles Center (403); Portland, OR
November 17, 2024*; 2:00 p.m., ESPN+		at Eastern Washington	W 71–62	3–0	22 – Burnham	11 – Burnham	4 – Meek	Reese Court (1,090); Cheney, WA
November 19, 2024*; 6:00 p.m., ESPN+		Seattle	W 78–55	4–0	15 – Hull	6 – Tied	7 – Meek	Chiles Center (415); Portland, OR
November 23, 2024*; 3:00 p.m., ESPN+		California Baptist	W 85–66	5–0	18 – Shearer	8 – Mark	6 – Meek	Chiles Center (667); Portland, OR
November 29, 2024*; 3:00 p.m.		vs. Southern Utah; Nugget Classic	W 77–63	6–0	23 – Burnham	12 – Burnham	4 – Mark	Lawlor Events Center; Reno, NV
November 30, 2024*; 4:00 p.m.		vs. Central Michigan; Nugget Classic	W 68–58	7–0	18 – Shearer	8 – Mark	3 – Tied	Lawlor Events Center; Reno, NV
December 1, 2024*; 1:00 p.m., MW Network		at Nevada; Nugget Classic	W 88–72	8–0	26 – Shearer	8 – Mark	4 – Mark	Lawlor Events Center; Reno, NV
December 6, 2024*; 6:00 p.m., KRCW/ESPN+		Princeton	W 74–55	9–0	19 – Shearer	7 – Hull	4 – Tied	Chiles Center (665); Portland, OR
December 8, 2024*; 2:00 p.m., ESPN+		UTEP	W 83–67	10–0	25 – Burnham	8 – Mark	7 – Shearer	Chiles Center (603); Portland, OR
December 13, 2024*; 6:00 p.m., KRCW/ESPN+		Portland State	W 71–46	11–0	16 – Burnham	5 – Burnham	8 – Burnham	Chiles Center (557); Portland, OR
WCC regular season
December 19, 2024; 6:00 p.m., ESPN+		at Loyola Marymount	W 83–48	12–0 (1–0)	17 – Shearer	8 – Mark	5 – Meek	Gersten Pavilion (219); Los Angeles, CA
December 21, 2024; 3:30 p.m., ESPN+		Pacific	W 84–71	13–0 (2–0)	22 – Shearer	11 – Shearer	4 – Tied	Chiles Center (623); Portland, OR
December 28, 2024; 12:00 p.m., ESPN+		at Santa Clara	W 81–54	14–0 (3–0)	14 – Mark	13 – Mark	6 – Meek	Leavey Center (291); Santa Clara, CA
December 30, 2024; 6:00 p.m., ESPN+		Oregon State	L 72–76 ^{OT}	14–1 (3–1)	21 – Tied	6 – Tied	6 – Tied	Chiles Center (2,064); Portland, OR
January 2, 2025; 6:00 p.m., KRCW/ESPN+		Gonzaga	L 71–76	14–2 (3–2)	18 – Hull	5 – Hull	5 – Tied	Chiles Center (1,116); Portland, OR
January 4, 2025; 3:00 p.m., ESPN+		Loyola Marymount	W 80–61	15–2 (4–2)	16 – Shearer	7 – Burnham	11 – Meek	Chiles Center (636); Portland, OR
January 11, 2025; 5:00 p.m., KRCW/ESPN+		San Francisco	W 74–60	16–2 (5–2)	18 – Burnham	10 – Hull	4 – Mark	Chiles Center (1,097); Portland, OR
January 16, 2025; 6:00 p.m., ESPN+		at Gonzaga	L 65–66	16–3 (5–3)	20 – Burnham	6 – Hull	3 – Tied	McCarthey Athletic Center (5,414); Spokane, WA
January 18, 2025; 6:00 p.m., ESPN+		at Oregon State	W 86–61	17–3 (6–3)	26 – Burnham	7 – Tied	6 – Shearer	Gill Coliseum (4,695); Corvallis, OR
January 23, 2025; 6:00 p.m., ESPN+		at Washington State	W 83–65	18–3 (7–3)	24 – Shearer	12 – Mark	7 – Meek	Beasley Coliseum (1,015); Pullman, WA
January 30, 2025; 6:00 p.m., ESPN+		Saint Mary's	W 66–58	19–3 (8–3)	25 – Burnham	11 – Mark	10 – Shearer	Chiles Center (1,039); Portland, OR
February 1, 2025; 5:00 p.m., ESPN+		Pepperdine	W 76–52	20–3 (9–3)	24 – Shearer	11 – Hull	4 – Tied	Chiles Center (1,240); Portland, OR
February 6, 2025; 6:00 p.m., ESPN+		at San Diego	W 66–64	21–3 (10–3)	22 – Burnham	7 – Mark	5 – Meek	Jenny Craig Pavilion (142); San Diego, CA
February 10, 2025; 3:00 p.m., ESPN+		at Pepperdine; Rescheduled from January 9	W 77–75 ^{OT}	22–3 (11–3)	21 – Burnham	12 – Mark	5 – Tied	Firestone Fieldhouse (153); Malibu, CA
February 13, 2025; 6:30 p.m., ESPN+		at Saint Mary's	W 71–69	23–3 (12–3)	26 – Shearer	9 – Mark	11 – Mark	University Credit Union Pavilion (275); Moraga, CA
February 15, 2025; 3:00 p.m., ESPN+		Washington State	W 84–79	24–3 (13–3)	31 – Burnham	9 – Mark	11 – Meek	Chiles Center (1,518); Portland, OR
February 20, 2025; 6:00 p.m., ESPN+		San Diego	W 81–65	25–3 (14–3)	21 – Shearer	7 – Hull	7 – Meek	Chiles Center (756); Portland, OR
February 22, 2025; 5:00 p.m., ESPN+		Santa Clara	W 73–66	26–3 (15–3)	23 – Mark	11 – Mark	4 – Tied	Chiles Center (1,158); Portland, OR
February 27, 2025; 6:00 p.m., ESPN+		at San Francisco	W 68–67	27–3 (16–3)	20 – Shearer	10 – Hull	5 – Meek	Sobrato Center (305); San Francisco, CA
March 1, 2025; 1:00 p.m., ESPN+		at Pacific	W 94–88 ^{OT}	28–3 (17–3)	28 – Shearer	10 – Mark	3 – Shearer	Alex G. Spanos Center (640); Stockton, CA
WCC tournament
March 10, 2025; 2:30 p.m., ESPN+	(2)	vs. (3) Washington State; Semifinals	W 72–57	29–3	19 – Burnham	12 – Mark	4 – Shearer	Orleans Arena (2,936); Paradise, NV
March 11, 2025; 1:00 p.m., ESPN2	(2)	vs. (4) Oregon State; Championship	L 46–59	29–4	16 – Burnham	6 – Shearer	4 – Burnham	Orleans Arena (1,737); Paradise, NV
WBIT
March 20, 2025*; 7:00 p.m., ESPN+		at (2) Stanford; First round	W 69–68 ^{OT}	30–4	28 – Shearer	8 – Burnham	4 – Mark	Maples Pavilion (1,106); Stanford, CA
March 23, 2025*; 1:00 p.m., ESPN+		at (3) Seton Hall; Second round	W 61–55	31–4	15 – Shearer	6 – Tied	8 – Meek	Walsh Gymnasium (736); South Orange, NJ
March 27, 2025*; 4:00 p.m., ESPN+		at (4) Villanova; Quarterfinals	L 61–71	31–5	17 – Shearer	10 – Hull	7 – Meek	Finneran Pavilion (1,153); Villanova, PA
*Non-conference game. ^{#}Rankings from AP Poll. (#) Tournament seedings in parentheses. All times are in Pacific Time.

== See also ==
- 2024–25 Portland Pilots men's basketball team

== Rankings ==
Ranking movements Legend: ██ Increase in ranking ██ Decrease in ranking — = Not ranked RV = Received votes
	Week																			
Poll	Pre	1	2	3	4	5	6	7	8	9	10	11	12	13	14	15	16	17	18	Final
AP	—	—	—	—	—	—	—	—	—	RV	—	—	—	—	—	—	—	—		Not released
Coaches	—	—	—	—	—	—	—	—	—	—	—	—	—	—	—	—	—	—		
