= 2024–25 Santa Clara Broncos women's basketball team =

American college basketball season

2024–25 Santa Clara Broncos women's basketball
- Conference: West Coast Conference
- Record: 14–17 (8–12 WCC)
- Head coach: Michael Floyd (interim)
- Assistant coaches: Kristin Iwanaga; Kerri Nakamoto; Tahlia Garza
- Home arena: Leavey Center

2024–25 West Coast Conference women's basketball standings
	Conf.				Overall
Team	W		L	PCT	W		L	PCT
Gonzaga	17	–	3	.850	24	–	11	.686
Portland	17	–	3	.850	31	–	5	.861
Washington State	14	–	6	.700	21	–	14	.600
Oregon State †	12	–	8	.600	19	–	16	.543
San Francisco	11	–	9	.550	15	–	16	.484
Saint Mary's	10	–	10	.500	14	–	17	.452
Pacific	9	–	11	.450	15	–	19	.441
Santa Clara	8	–	12	.400	14	–	17	.452
Loyola Marymount	7	–	13	.350	14	–	16	.467
Pepperdine	3	–	17	.150	8	–	22	.267
San Diego	2	–	18	.100	7	–	24	.226
† 2025 WCC tournament winner

The 2024–25 Santa Clara Broncos women's basketball team represented Santa Clara University in the 2024–25 NCAA Division I women's basketball season. The Broncos were led by interim head coach Michael Floyd. The Broncos are members of the West Coast Conference and played their home games at the Leavey Center.

== Previous season ==
The Broncos finished the 2023–24 season 25–9, 12–4 in WCC play to finish in second place. As the No. 2 seed in the WCC tournament, they lost in the semifinals to Portland. They received an at-large bid to the WBIT where they defeated BYU in the first round before losing to Washington State in the second round.

Bill Carr announced his resignation from Santa Clara on October 12, 2024 after 8 seasons. Broncos associate head coach Floyd was tabbed as the interim head coach for the season.

== Offseason ==
=== Departures ===
Santa Clara Departures
Name	Num	Pos.	Height	Year	Hometown	Reason for Departure
Keeley Frawley	2	F	6'0"	Senior	Melbourne, Australia	Graduated
Lara Edmanson	13	G/F	6'0"	Senior	Melbourne, Australia	Transferred to Villanova
Jayde Cadee	22	G	5'11"	Senior	Melbourne, Australia	Graduated
Marya Hudgins	23	G	6'0"	Sophomore	Aurora, CO	Transferred to BYU
Rafailia Stergaki	24	G	5'10"	Junior	Thessaloniki, Greece	Transferred to Delta State
Ashley Hiraki	31	G	5'7"	Senior	San Jose, CA	Transferred to Cal Poly
Danja Stafford Collins	33	F	6'1"	Graduate Student	Orem, UT	Transferred to Utah Valley
Tess Heal	34	G	5'10"	Sophomore	Melbourne, Australia	Transferred to Stanford
Emma Shaffer	52	F	6'2"	Graduate Student	Cincinnati, OH	Graduated

=== Incoming ===
Santa Clara Incoming Transfers
Name	Num	Pos.	Height	Year	Hometown	Previous School
Mia Curtis	4	G	5'9"	Graduate Student	Minneapolis, MN	Dartmouth
Alana Goodchild	11	F	6'2"	Junior	Sydney, Australia	Northwestern
Kaya Ingram	20	G	5'8"	Graduate Student	Albuquerque, NM	Cornell
Hannah Rapp	21	G	5'10"	Senior	Melbourne, Australia	Saint Mary's
Irena Korolenko	23	F	6'0"	Graduate Student	Redmond, WA	Seattle

==== Recruiting ====
There was no recruiting class of 2024.

== Roster ==
2024–25 Santa Clara Broncos women's basketball team
Players
Coaches

Pos.	#	Name	Height	Year	Previous school	Hometown
G	0	Malia Latu	5 ft 8 in (1.73 m)	Sr	Menlo-Atherton HS; San Francisco	East Palo Alto, CA
G	4	Mia Curtis	5 ft 9 in (1.75 m)	GS	Minnehaha Academy; Dartmouth	Minneapolis, MN
F	5	Olivia Pollerd	6 ft 3 in (1.91 m)	Sr	Lake Ginninderra College; Washington	Melbourne, Australia
F	10	Georgia Grigoropoulou	6 ft 3 in (1.91 m)	Jr	ACS Athens	Athens, Greece
F	11	Alana Goodchild	6 ft 2 in (1.88 m)	Jr	AIS; Northwestern	Sydney, Australia
G	12	Maddie Naro	5 ft 7 in (1.7 m)	So	Beaverton HS	Beaverton, OR
F	13	Lauren Grover (W)	6 ft 1 in (1.85 m)	RS Sr	Santiago HS	Corona, CA
G	20	Kaya Ingram	5 ft 8 in (1.73 m)	GS	La Cueva HS; Cornell	Albuquerque, NM
G	21	Hannah Rapp	5 ft 10 in (1.78 m)	Sr	Avila College; Saint Mary's	Melbourne, Australia
F	23	Irena Korolenko	6 ft 0 in (1.83 m)	GS	Cedar Park Christian; Seattle	Redmond, WA
G	33	Gabby Harris (W)	5 ft 11 in (1.8 m)	Jr	Pinewood	Sunnyvale, CA

Head coach

- Michael Floyd (Murray State)

Assistant coach(es)

- Kristin Iwanaga (California)
- Kerri Nakamoto (Cal Poly)
- Tahlia Garza (UC Irvine)

Legend

- (C) Team captain
- (S) Suspended
- (I) Ineligible
- (W) Walk-on
- Injured
- Current redshirt

Roster

== Schedule and results ==
Date time, TV	Rank^{#}	Opponent^{#}	Result	Record	High points	High rebounds	High assists	Site (attendance) city, state
Exhibition
October 30, 2024*; 6:00 p.m.		Hawaii Pacific						Leavey Center; Santa Clara, CA
Non-conference regular season
November 4, 2024*; 6:00 p.m., ESPN+		UC Riverside	W 73–60	1–0	21 – Pollerd	7 – Pollerd	7 – Naro	Leavey Center (275); Santa Clara, CA
November 9, 2024*; 6:00 p.m., MW Network		at Fresno State	W 67–61	2–0	33 – Pollerd	8 – Grigoropoulou	6 – Naro	Save Mart Center (997); Fresno, CA
November 15, 2024*; 12:00 p.m., B1G+		at No. 3 USC	L 50–81	2–1	13 – Ingram	8 – Rapp	3 – Naro	Galen Center (3,594); Los Angeles, CA
November 19, 2024*; 4:00 p.m., ESPN+		Jessup	W 67–41	3–1	24 – Pollerd	8 – Rapp	5 – Naro	Leavey Center (132); Santa Clara, CA
November 24, 2024*; 2:00 p.m., ESPN+		UC Davis	L 70–74 ^{OT}	3–2	23 – Pollerd	9 – Pollerd	4 – Tied	Leavey Center (237); Santa Clara, CA
November 29, 2024*; 2:00 p.m., FloSports		vs. Butler; Gulf Coast Showcase quarterfinals	L 50–79	3–3	14 – Pollerd	6 – Grigoropoulou	4 – Naro	Hertz Arena (213); Estero, FL
November 30, 2024*; 10:30 a.m., FloSports		vs. New Mexico State; Gulf Coast Showcase consolation 2nd round	L 49–61	3–4	15 – Pollerd	8 – Goodchild	2 – Latu	Hertz Arena (245); Estero, FL
December 1, 2024*; 8:00 a.m., FloSports		vs. High Point; Gulf Coast Showcase 7th place game	W 74–65	4–4	15 – Tied	10 – Grigoropoulou	5 – Naro	Hertz Arena (203); Estero, FL
December 7, 2024*; 12:00 p.m., ESPN+		Cal Maritime	W 86–27	5–4	14 – Tied	11 – Rapp	4 – Naro	Leavey Center (275); Santa Clara, CA
December 15, 2024*; 2:00 p.m., ESPN+		North Texas	W 63–58	6–4	16 – Rapp	10 – Grigoropoulou	6 – Naro	Leavey Center (163); Santa Clara, CA
WCC regular season
December 19, 2024; 6:00 p.m., ESPN+		at Saint Mary's	L 56–64 ^{OT}	6–5 (0–1)	16 – Naro	13 – Rapp	4 – Pollerd	Leavey Center (243); Santa Clara, CA
December 21, 2024; 4:00 p.m., ESPN+		at Pepperdine	W 70–69	7–5 (1–1)	17 – Pollerd	8 – Tied	6 – Naro	Firestone Fieldhouse (209); Malibu, CA
December 28, 2024; 12:00 p.m., ESPN+		Portland	L 54–81	7–6 (1–2)	15 – Pollerd	11 – Grigoropoulou	6 – Naro	Leavey Center (291); Santa Clara, CA
December 30, 2024; 6:00 p.m., ESPN+		San Francisco	L 53–65	7–7 (1–3)	13 – Tied	12 – Pollerd	5 – Latu	Leavey Center (241); Santa Clara, CA
January 2, 2025; 6:00 p.m., ESPN+		at Washington State	W 68–62	8–7 (2–3)	21 – Latu	7 – Pollerd	5 – Naro	Beasley Coliseum (865); Pullman, WA
January 4, 2025; 2:00 p.m., ESPN+		at Gonzaga	L 56–82	8–8 (2–4)	13 – Pollerd	6 – Rapp	3 – Naro	McCarthey Athletic Center (5,280); Spokane, WA
January 9, 2025; 6:00 p.m., ESPN+		at Pacific	L 64–75	8–9 (2–5)	27 – Pollerd	7 – Grigoropoulou	5 – Naro	Alex G. Spanos Center (614); Stockton, CA
January 11, 2025; 12:00 p.m., ESPN+		San Diego	W 67–59	9–9 (3–5)	20 – Pollerd	10 – Pollerd	4 – Ingram	Leavey Center (287); Santa Clara, CA
January 16, 2025; 6:00 p.m., ESPN+		Oregon State	L 72–74	9–10 (3–6)	17 – tied	8 – Latu	9 – Pollerd	Leavey Center (280); Santa Clara, CA
January 18, 2025; 2:00 p.m., ESPN+		Washington State	L 47–74	9–11 (3–7)	15 – Latu	6 – Pollerd	2 – Naro	Leavey Center (299); Santa Clara, CA
January 23, 2025; 6:00 p.m., ESPN+		at Loyola Marymount	W 67–60	10–11 (4–7)	21 – Latu	9 – Pollerd	4 – Pollerd	Gersten Pavilion (191); Los Angeles, CA
January 25, 2025; 5:00 p.m., ESPN+		at Saint Mary's	W 74–67 ^{OT}	11–11 (5–7)	16 – Pollerd	7 – Ingram	6 – Latu	University Credit Union Pavilion (513); Moraga, CA
February 1, 2025; 2:00 p.m., ESPN+		at San Francisco	W 59–50	12–11 (6–7)	21 – Pollerd	11 – Pollerd	5 – Curtis	Sobrato Center; San Francisco, CA
February 6, 2025; 6:00 p.m., ESPN+		Pacific	W 69–58	13–11 (7–7)	22 – Pollerd	8 – Pollerd	7 – Latu	Leavey Center (335); Santa Clara, CA
February 8, 2025; 12:00 p.m., ESPN+		Loyola Marymount	L 62–69	13–12 (7–8)	23 – Pollerd	12 – Pollerd	6 – Naro	Leavey Center (660); Santa Clara, CA
February 13, 2025; 6:00 p.m., ESPN+		Pepperdine	W 54–46	14–12 (8–8)	15 – Latu	8 – Rapp	4 – Rapp	Leavey Center (365); Santa Clara, CA
February 15, 2025; 2:00 p.m., ESPN+		at San Diego	L 57–63	14–13 (8–9)	17 – Pollerd	5 – tied	5 – Ingram	Jenny Craig Pavilion (560); San Diego, CA
February 20, 2025; 6:00 p.m., ESPN+		at Oregon State	L 51–68	14–14 (8–10)	21 – Pollerd	7 – Grigoropoulou	3 – Ingram	Gill Coliseum (3,751); Corvallis, OR
February 22, 2025; 5:00 p.m., ESPN+		at Portland	L 66–73	14–15 (8–11)	15 – Pollerd	10 – Pollerd	5 – Naro	Chiles Center (1,158); Portland, OR
March 1, 2025; 2:00 p.m., ESPN+		Gonzaga	L 61–68	14–16 (8–12)	17 – Rapp	10 – Rapp	5 – Pollerd	Leavey Center (400); Santa Clara, CA
WCC Women's Tournament
March 7, 2025; 12:00 p.m., ESPN+	(8)	vs. (9) Loyola Marymount; Second Round	L 52–66	14–17	19 – Latu	9 – Pollerd	3 – tied	Orleans Arena (828); Paradise, NV
*Non-conference game. ^{#}Rankings from AP Poll. (#) Tournament seedings in parentheses. All times are in Pacific Time.

== See also ==
- 2024–25 Santa Clara Broncos men's basketball team
