= 2024–25 Saint Mary's Gaels women's basketball team =

American college basketball season

2024–25 Saint Mary's Gaels women's basketball

WNIT, First Round
- Conference: West Coast Conference
- Record: 14–17 (10–10 WCC)
- Head coach: Jeff Cammon (2nd season)
- Assistant coaches: Kevin Adams; Lexi Petersen; Brendan Wheeler; Brittany Boyd-Jones
- Home arena: University Credit Union Pavilion

2024–25 West Coast Conference women's basketball standings
	Conf.				Overall
Team	W		L	PCT	W		L	PCT
Gonzaga	17	–	3	.850	24	–	11	.686
Portland	17	–	3	.850	31	–	5	.861
Washington State	14	–	6	.700	21	–	14	.600
Oregon State †	12	–	8	.600	19	–	16	.543
San Francisco	11	–	9	.550	15	–	16	.484
Saint Mary's	10	–	10	.500	14	–	17	.452
Pacific	9	–	11	.450	15	–	19	.441
Santa Clara	8	–	12	.400	14	–	17	.452
Loyola Marymount	7	–	13	.350	14	–	16	.467
Pepperdine	3	–	17	.150	8	–	22	.267
San Diego	2	–	18	.100	7	–	24	.226
† 2025 WCC tournament winner

The 2024–25 Saint Mary's Gaels women's basketball team represented the Saint Mary's College of California in the 2024–25 NCAA Division I women's basketball season. The Gaels, led by second-year coach Jeff Cammon, play their homes games at University Credit Union Pavilion and are members of the West Coast Conference.

== Previous season ==
The Gaels finished the 2023–24 season 13–18, 6–10 in WCC play to finish in sixth place. As the No. 6 seed in the WCC tournament, they lost in the second round to Loyola Marymount.

== Offseason ==
=== Departures ===
Saint Mary's departures
Name	Num	Pos.	Height	Year	Hometown	Reason for departure
Makena Mastora	1	G	5'9"	Junior	Alameda, CA	Transferred to Pepperdine
Leia Hanafin	3	G	5'11"	Senior	Melbourne, Australia	Graduated
Tayla Dalton	10	G	5'9"	Senior	Auckland, New Zealand	Transferred to Gonzaga
Jasmine Farmer	11	G	5'9"	Junior	Hercules, CA	Mid season transferred
Ruby Vlahov	12	F	6'3"	Freshman	Perth, Australia	Transferred to UC Santa Barbara
Hannah Rapp	21	G	5'10"	Junior	Melbourne, Australia	Transferred to Santa Clara
Ellie Croco	22	F	6'1"	Senior	Lebanon, OR	Transferred to Western Washington
Ali Bamberger	33	F	6'3"	(redshirt) Senior	Walnut Creek, CA	Graduated

=== Incoming transfers ===
Saint Mary's incoming transfers
Name	Num	Pos.	Height	Year	Hometown	Previous school
Jada Hunter	0	G	5'10"	Sophomore	Vallejo, CA	Laney College
Sasha Murphy	4	G	5'10"	Junior	Culver City, CA	UC Riverside
Abby Shoff	5	F	6'0"	Junior	Redding, CA	Long Beach State
Kennedy Johnson	21	G	5'11"	Senior	Hayward, CA	Idaho
Melesungu Afeaki	22	F	6'2"	Junior	San Bruno, CA	San Diego
Mali Ennis	32	G	5'10"	Junior	Burlingame, CA	Skyline College
Ella Wedin	33	G	6'1"	Sophomore	Happy Valley, OR	Loyola Marymount

==== Recruiting ====
There was no recruiting class of 2024.

== Roster ==
2024–25 Saint Mary's Gaels women's basketball team
Players
Coaches

Pos.	#	Name	Height	Year	Previous school	Hometown
G	0	Jada Hunter	5 ft 10 in (1.78 m)	So	Christian Brothers; Laney College	Vallejo, CA
G	2	Amy Kurkowski	6 ft 1 in (1.85 m)	Fr	Emmanuel College	Melbourne, Australia
G	3	Mauriana Hashemian-Orr	5 ft 7 in (1.7 m)	Fr	Benson Tech Poly	Portland, OR
G	4	Sasha Murphy	5 ft 10 in (1.78 m)	Jr	Rolling Hills Prep; UC Riverside	Culver City, CA
F	5	Abigail Shoff	6 ft 0 in (1.83 m)	Jr	Enterprise; Long Beach State	Redding, CA
F	7	Edie Clarke	6 ft 4 in (1.93 m)	Fr	Geelong	Melbourne, Australia
G	8	Emily Foy	6 ft 1 in (1.85 m)	So	St. Francis Xavier's College	Newcastle, Australia
G	9	Maia Jones	5 ft 10 in (1.78 m)	RS So	Waimea College	Richmond, New Zealand
G	21	Kennedy Johnson	5 ft 11 in (1.8 m)	Sr	Bishop O'Dowd; Idaho	Hayward, CA
F	22	Melesungu Afeaki	6 ft 2 in (1.88 m)	Jr	Capuchino; San Diego	San Bruno, CA
G	23	Addison Wedin	5 ft 10 in (1.78 m)	RS Jr	La Salle	Milwaukie, OR
G	24	Zeryhia Aokuso	5 ft 10 in (1.78 m)	So	Amarillo	Amarillo, TX
F	31	Nadia Bernard	6 ft 4 in (1.93 m)	So	West Ranch	Santa Clarita, CA
G	32	Mali Ennis	5 ft 10 in (1.78 m)	Jr	St. Ignatius College Prep; Skyline College	Burlingame, CA
G	33	Ella Wedin	6 ft 1 in (1.85 m)	So	La Salle; Loyola Marymount	Happy Valley, OR

Head coach

- Jeff Cammon (Alcorn State)

Assistant coach(es)

- Kevin Adams (Cal Baptist)
- Lexi Petersen (Oregon)
- Brendan Wheeler (Cal State Northridge)
- Brittany Boyd-Jones (California)

Legend

- (C) Team captain
- (S) Suspended
- (I) Ineligible
- (W) Walk-on
- Injured
- Current redshirt

Roster

== Schedule and results ==
Date time, TV	Rank^{#}	Opponent^{#}	Result	Record	High points	High rebounds	High assists	Site (attendance) city, state
Exhibition
December 14, 2024*; 5:00 p.m.		Sonoma State						University Credit Union Pavilion; Moraga, CA
Non-conference regular season
November 4, 2024*; 6:00 p.m., ACCNX		at California	L 58–90	0–1	13 – Foy	7 – Foy	2 – Tied	Haas Pavilion (1,231); Berkeley, CA
November 9, 2024*; 1:00 p.m., ESPN+		Denver	W 69–64	1–1	19 – Johnson	6 – Tied	8 – Jones	University Credit Union Pavilion (425); Moraga, CA
November 14, 2024*; 11:00 a.m., ESPN+		at UC San Diego	W 74–65 ^{2OT}	2–1	28 – Jones	11 – Shoff	3 – Jones	LionTree Arena (2,649); San Diego, CA
November 16, 2024*; 2:00 p.m., ESPN+		at UC Irvine	L 61–64	2–2	17 – Johnson	8 – Johnson	5 – Jones	Bren Events Center (548); Irvine, CA
November 22, 2024*; 3:30 p.m.		vs. Eastern Washington; Bank of Hawai'i Classic	W 59–57	3–2	9 – Tied	4 – Tied	3 – Jones	Stan Sheriff Center (2,694); Honolulu, HI
November 24, 2024*; 2:00 p.m.		vs. Louisiana–Monroe; Bank of Hawai'i Classic	W 68–61	4–2	19 – Jones	6 – Johnson	6 – Jones	Stan Sheriff Center; Honolulu, HI
November 30, 2024*; 2:00 p.m., ESPN+		UC Riverside	L 41–49	4–3	9 – Johnson	5 – Johnson	4 – Hashemian-Orr	University Credit Union Pavilion (315); Moraga, CA
December 4, 2024*; 6:00 p.m., MW Network		at San Jose State	L 46–51	4–4	14 – Johnson	5 – Jones	3 – Foy	Provident Credit Union Event Center (327); San Jose, CA
December 7, 2024*; 2:00 p.m., ESPN+		California Baptist	L 68–71	4–5	14 – Foy	6 – Foy	6 – Hashemian-Orr	University Credit Union Pavilion (325); Moraga, CA
WCC regular season
December 19, 2024; 6:00 p.m., ESPN+		at Santa Clara	W 64–56 ^{OT}	5–5 (1–0)	25 – Johnson	9 – Johnson	8 – Aokuso	Leavey Center (243); Santa Clara, CA
December 21, 2024; 2:00 p.m., ESPN+		Loyola Marymount	W 59–54	6–5 (2–0)	15 – Johnson	7 – Johnson	12 – Aokuso	University Credit Union Pavilion (278); Moraga, CA
December 28, 2024; 2:00 p.m., ESPN+		at Pacific	W 80–78 ^{OT}	7–5 (3–0)	23 – Jones	5 – Tied	3 – Tied	Alex G. Spanos Center (1,027); Stockton, CA
December 30, 2024; 2:00 p.m., ESPN+		San Diego	W 85–75	8–5 (4–0)	21 – Aokuso	5 – Hunter	6 – Aokuso	University Credit Union Pavilion (326); Moraga, CA
January 2, 2025; 6:00 p.m., ESPN+		at San Francisco	L 73–87	8–6 (4–1)	19 – Shoff	4 – Tied	4 – Aokuso	Sobrato Center (294); San Francisco, CA
January 9, 2025; 6:30 p.m., ESPN+		Washington State	L 57–66	8–7 (4–2)	11 – Jones	6 – Shoff	5 – Hunter	University Credit Union Pavilion (312); Moraga, CA
January 11, 2025; 5:00 p.m., ESPN+		Pacific	W 64–44	9–7 (5–2)	18 – Foy	8 – Shoff	6 – Aokuso	University Credit Union Pavilion (411); Moraga, CA
January 16, 2025; 6:30 p.m., ESPN+		Pepperdine	W 56–41	10–7 (6–2)	14 – Johnson	9 – Jones	5 – Aokuso	University Credit Union Pavilion (302); Moraga, CA
January 23, 2025; 6:00 p.m., ESPN+		at San Diego	W 72–63	11–7 (7–2)	23 – Jones	5 – Clarke	4 – Jones	Jenny Craig Pavilion (158); San Diego, CA
January 25, 2025; 5:00 p.m., ESPN+		Santa Clara	L 67–74 ^{OT}	11–8 (7–3)	23 – Jones	12 – Johnson	6 – Aokuso	University Credit Union Pavilion (513); Moraga, CA
January 30, 2025; 6:00 p.m., ESPN+		at Portland	L 58–66	11–9 (7–4)	13 – Foy	8 – Johnson	5 – Aokuso	Chiles Center (1,039); Portland, OR
February 1, 2025; 2:00 p.m., ESPN+		at Oregon State	L 45–80	11–10 (7–5)	8 – Kurkowski	4 – Tied	3 – Hashemian-Orr	Gill Coliseum (4,121); Corvallis, OR
February 6, 2025; 6:30 p.m., ESPN+		Gonzaga	L 58–69	11–11 (7–6)	16 – Johnson	5 – Tied	6 – Aokuso	University Credit Union Pavilion (344); Moraga, CA
February 8, 2025; 5:00 p.m., ESPN+		San Francisco	W 52–49	12–11 (8–6)	16 – Jones	8 – Clarke	7 – Johnson	University Credit Union Pavilion (430); Moraga, CA
February 13, 2025; 6:30 p.m., ESPN+		Portland	L 69–71	12–12 (8–7)	17 – Foy	7 – Johnson	5 – Hunter	University Credit Union Pavilion (275); Moraga, CA
February 15, 2025; 1:00 p.m., ESPN+		at Pepperdine	W 68–54	13–12 (9–7)	16 – Aokuso	7 – Aokuso	5 – Hunter	Firestone Fieldhouse (233); Malibu, CA
February 20, 2025; 6:00 p.m., ESPN+		at Gonzaga	L 53–60	13–13 (9–8)	15 – Jones	5 – Jones	4 – Hunter	McCarthey Athletic Center (5,441); Spokane, WA
February 22, 2025; 11:00 a.m., ESPN+		at Washington State	L 62–72	13–14 (9–9)	17 – Aokuso	6 – Jones	5 – Jones	Beasley Coliseum (1,467); Pullman, WA
February 27, 2025; 6:30 p.m., ESPN+		Oregon State	W 69–66	14–14 (10–9)	27 – Jones	9 – Johnson	6 – Jones	University Credit Union Pavilion (397); Moraga, CA
March 1, 2025; 4:00 p.m., ESPN+		at Loyola Marymount	L 61–65	14–15 (10–10)	14 – Jones	8 – Johnson	4 – Tied	Gersten Pavilion (289); Los Angeles, CA
WCC women's tournament
March 8, 2025; 2:30 p.m., ESPN+	(6)	vs. (7) Pacific; Third Round	L 59–74	14–16	17 – Jones	15 – Johnson	5 – Aokuso	Orleans Arena (1,030); Paradise, NV
WNIT
March 20, 2025*; 4:30 p.m., ESPN+		at Texas Southern; First Round	L 50–54	14–17	14 – Tied	9 – Clarke	6 – Hunter	H&PE Arena (573); Houston, TX
*Non-conference game. ^{#}Rankings from AP Poll. (#) Tournament seedings in parentheses. All times are in Pacific Time.

== See also ==
- 2024–25 Saint Mary's Gaels men's basketball team
