= 2024–25 Gonzaga Bulldogs women's basketball team =

American college basketball season

2024–25 Gonzaga Bulldogs women's basketball

WCC regular season co-champions

WBIT, Quarterfinals
- Conference: West Coast Conference
- Record: 24–11 (17–3 WCC)
- Head coach: Lisa Fortier (11th season)
- Assistant coaches: Jordan Green; Stacy Clinesmith; Craig Fortier
- Home arena: McCarthey Athletic Center

2024–25 West Coast Conference women's basketball standings
	Conf.				Overall
Team	W		L	PCT	W		L	PCT
Gonzaga	17	–	3	.850	24	–	11	.686
Portland	17	–	3	.850	31	–	5	.861
Washington State	14	–	6	.700	21	–	14	.600
Oregon State †	12	–	8	.600	19	–	16	.543
San Francisco	11	–	9	.550	15	–	16	.484
Saint Mary's	10	–	10	.500	14	–	17	.452
Pacific	9	–	11	.450	15	–	19	.441
Santa Clara	8	–	12	.400	14	–	17	.452
Loyola Marymount	7	–	13	.350	14	–	16	.467
Pepperdine	3	–	17	.150	8	–	22	.267
San Diego	2	–	18	.100	7	–	24	.226
† 2025 WCC tournament winner

The 2024–25 Gonzaga Bulldogs women's basketball team represented Gonzaga University in the 2024–25 NCAA Division I women's basketball season. The Bulldogs (also informally referred to as the "Zags"), members of the West Coast Conference, were led by eleventh-year head coach Lisa Fortier and play home games at the McCarthey Athletic Center on the university campus in Spokane, Washington.

== Previous season ==
The Bulldogs finished the season at 32–4 and 16–0 in WCC play to win the WCC regular season championship. They advanced to the WCC women's tournament championship game where they lost to Portland. They received an at-large bid to the NCAA Women's Tournament as a 4th seed in Portland region 4 where they defeated UC Irvine and Utah first and second rounds to advance to the sweet sixteen for the first time since 2015, where they lost to Texas.

== Offseason ==
=== Departures ===
Due to COVID-19 disruptions throughout NCAA sports in 2020–21, the NCAA announced that the 2020–21 season would not count against the athletic eligibility of any individual involved in an NCAA winter sport, including women's basketball. This meant that all seniors in 2023–24 had the option to return for 2024–25.

Name	Number	Pos.	Height	Year	Hometown	Reason left
Destiny Burton	1	F	6'0"	Senior	Wichita, KS	Graduated
Payton Muma	3	G	5'8"	(redshirt) Sophomore	Highlands Ranch, CO	Transferred to Wyoming
Calli Stokes	10	F	5'11"	(redshirt) Sophomore	Redondo Beach, CA	Transferred to South Alabama for track and field
Kayleigh Truong	11	G	5'9"	GS Senior	Houston, TX	Graduated
Eliza Hollingsworth	12	F	6'2"	(redshirt) Senior	Melbourne, Australia	Graduated
Naya Ojukwu	13	F	6'0"	(redshirt) Freshman	Meridan, ID	Transferred to Morgan State
Kaylynne Truong	14	G	5'8"	GS Senior	Houston, TX	Graduated/2024 WNBA draft; selected 21st overall by Washington Mystics
Brynna Maxwell	22	G	6'0"	GS Senior	Gig Harbor, WA	Graduated/2024 WNBA draft; selected 13th overall by Chicago Sky

=== Incoming transfers ===
Name	Number	Pos.	Height	Year	Hometown	Previous school
Vera Gunaydin	2	G	5'9"	Junior	Ankara, Turkey	South Georgia Tech
Inês Bettencourt	8	G	5'9"	Junior	São Miguel, Portugal	UConn
Tayla Dalton	10	G	5'9"	GS Senior	Auckland, New Zealand	Saint Mary's
McKynnlie Dalan	22	F	6'1"	Sophomore	Montesano, WA	Minnesota

==== Recruiting ====
There was no recruiting class of 2024.

== Roster ==
2024–25 Gonzaga Bulldogs women's basketball team
Players
Coaches

Pos.	#	Name	Height	Year	Previous school	Hometown
F	0	Esther Little	6 ft 2 in (1.88 m)	RS Sr	Ipswich Basketball Academy	Ipswich, England
G	2	Vera Gunaydin	5 ft 9 in (1.75 m)	Jr	N/A; South Georgia Tech	Ankara, Turkey
G	4	Claire O'Connor	6 ft 0 in (1.83 m)	So	Lakeside	Bellevue, WA
G	5	Maud Huijbens	6 ft 3 in (1.91 m)	Sr	Syracuse	Hilversum, Netherlands
G	8	Inês Bettencourt	5 ft 9 in (1.75 m)	Jr	Clube União Sportiva; UConn	São Miguel, Portugal
G	10	Tayla Dalton	5 ft 9 in (1.75 m)	GS	Carmel College; Saint Mary's	Auckland, New Zealand
G	11	Allie Turner	5 ft 8 in (1.73 m)	Fr	John Burroughs	St. Louis, MO
G	12	Christabel Osarobo	5 ft 11 in (1.8 m)	Fr		Tudela, Spain
F	15	Yvonne Ejim	6 ft 1 in (1.85 m)	GS	Edge School	Calgary, AB
F	22	McKynnlie Dalan	6 ft 1 in (1.85 m)	So	Montesano; Minnesota	Montesano, WA
F	31	Ella Hopkins	6 ft 3 in (1.91 m)	RS Fr	Lourdes	Rochester, MN
F	33	Lauren Whittaker	6 ft 3 in (1.91 m)	RS Fr	St. Andrew's College	Cantebury, New Zealand
G	35	Bree Salenbien	6 ft 2 in (1.88 m)	RS Jr	Lenawee Christian	Adrian, MI

Head coach

- Lisa Fortier (Cal State Monterey Bay)

Assistant coach(es)

- Jordan Green (George Fox)
- Stacy Clinesmith (UC Santa Barbara)
- Craig Fortier (Cal State Monterey Bay)

Legend

- (C) Team captain
- (S) Suspended
- (I) Ineligible
- (W) Walk-on
- Injured
- Current redshirt

Roster

== Schedule and results ==
Date time, TV	Rank^{#}	Opponent^{#}	Result	Record	High points	High rebounds	High assists	Site (attendance) city, state
Exhibition
November 1, 2024*; 6:00 p.m.		College of Idaho	W 79–39		–	–	–	McCarthey Athletic Center; Spokane, WA
Non-conference regular season
November 5, 2024*; 6:00 p.m., ESPN+		Montana	W 82–69	1–0	18 – Turner	10 – Ejim	5 – Bettencourt	McCarthey Athletic Center (4,952); Spokane, WA
November 10, 2024*; 12:00 p.m., ESPN2		at Stanford	L 58–89	1–1	18 – Turner	8 – Ejim	3 – Huijbens	Maples Pavilion (3,865); Stanford, CA
November 14, 2024*; 6:00 p.m., SWX/ESPN+		California	L 65–86	1–2	27 – Ejim	9 – Huijbens	4 – Huijbens	McCarthey Athletic Center (5,060); Spokane, WA
November 17, 2024*; 1:00 p.m., SWX/ESPN+		Wyoming	W 62–51	2–2	17 – Bettencourt	11 – Ejim	2 – tied	McCarthey Athletic Center (5,268); Spokane, WA
November 21, 2024*; 6:00 p.m., ESPN+		Rice	W 72–69	3–2	22 – Ejim	11 – Ejim	4 – tied	McCarthey Athletic Center (4,876); Spokane, WA
November 24, 2024*; 1:00 p.m., MW Network		at New Mexico	W 81–68	4–2	26 – Ejim	17 – Ejim	8 – Ejim	The Pit (4,943); Albuquerque, NM
November 28, 2024*; 2:30 p.m., ESPN+		vs. Missouri State; Paradise Jam Reef Division	L 64–65	4–3	21 – Ejim	12 – Huijbens	5 – Ejim	Sports and Fitness Center (N/A); Saint Thomas, USVI
November 29, 2024*; 5:00 p.m., ESPN+		vs. Texas Tech; Paradise Jam Reef Division	L 49–67	4–4	14 – Turner	10 – Ejim	3 – Turner	Sports and Fitness Center (1,725); Saint Thomas, USVI
November 30, 2024*; 5:00 p.m., ESPN+		vs. Florida State; Paradise Jam Reef Division	L 54–95	4–5	20 – Ejim	7 – O'Connor	4 – Huijbens	Sports and Fitness Center (2,525); Saint Thomas, USVI
December 8, 2024*; 12:00 p.m., MW Network		at Colorado State	L 72–74 ^{OT}	4–6	22 – Ejim	19 – Huijbens	9 – Turner	Moby Arena (5,500); Fort Collins, CO
December 14, 2024*; 2:00 p.m., SWX/ESPN+		Eastern Washington	W 79–50	5–6	28 – Ejim	9 – Little	5 – Ejim	McCarthey Athletic Center (5,243); Spokane, WA
WCC regular season
December 19, 2024; 6:00 p.m., ESPN+		at San Francisco	L 58–73	5–7 (0–1)	20 – Ejim	6 – Huijbens	4 – Turner	Sobrato Center (358); San Francisco, CA
December 21, 2024; 2:00 p.m., ESPN+		at San Diego	W 66–59	6–7 (1–1)	29 – Ejim	8 – tied	4 – tied	Jenny Craig Pavilion (754); San Diego, CA
December 28, 2024; 1:00 p.m., ESPN2		Oregon State	L 67–71 ^{OT}	6–8 (1–2)	22 – Ejim	8 – Ejim	9 – Turner	McCarthey Athletic Center (5,615); Spokane, WA
December 30, 2024; 6:00 p.m., ESPN+		Pepperdine	W 75–54	7–8 (2–2)	23 – Ejim	9 – O'Connor	6 – Turner	McCarthey Athletic Center (5,165); Spokane, WA
January 2, 2025; 6:00 p.m., ESPN+		at Portland	W 76–71	8–8 (3–2)	19 – Huijbens	12 – Huijbens	6 – Turner	Chiles Center (1,116); Portland, OR
January 4, 2025; 2:00 p.m., ESPN+		Santa Clara	W 82–56	9–8 (4–2)	23 – Huijbens	10 – tied	8 – Ejim	McCarthey Athletic Center (5,280); Spokane, WA
January 11, 2025; 12:00 p.m., ESPN+		at Washington State	W 69–61	10–8 (5–2)	20 – Turner	13 – Huijbens	5 – tied	Beasley Coliseum (1,639); Pullman, WA
January 16, 2025; 6:00 p.m., SWX/ESPN+		Portland	W 66–65	11–8 (6–2)	35 – Ejim	13 – Ejim	6 – Turner	McCarthey Athletic Center (5,414); Spokane, WA
January 18, 2025; 2:00 p.m., ESPN+		at Loyola Marymount	W 69–58	12–8 (6–2)	23 – Turner	11 – Little	5 – Ejim	Gersten Pavilion (301); Los Angeles, CA
January 25, 2025; 1:00 p.m., ESPN+		at Pepperdine	W 81–53	13–8 (8–2)	29 – Ejim	12 – Ejim	4 – Ejim	Firestone Fieldhouse (160); Malibu, CA
January 30, 2025; 6:00 p.m., SWX/ESPN+		San Diego	W 64–48	14–8 (9–2)	25 – Ejim	8 – Ejim	6 – Bettencourt	McCarthey Athletic Center (5,006); Spokane, WA
February 1, 2025; 2:00 p.m., ESPN+		Pacific	W 68–64	15–8 (10–2)	23 – Ejim	12 – Ejim	4 – Salenbien	McCarthey Athletic Center (5,328); Spokane, WA
February 6, 2025; 6:30 p.m., ESPN+		at Saint Mary's	W 69–58	16–8 (11–2)	27 – Ejim	12 – Little	5 – Dalton	University Credit Union Pavilion (344); Moraga, CA
February 8, 2025; 2:00 p.m., SWX/ESPN+		Washington State	W 73–69 ^{OT}	17–8 (11–3)	16 – Ejim	17 – Ejim	5 – Turner	McCarthey Athletic Center (6,000); Spokane, WA
February 13, 2025; 6:00 p.m., ESPN+		at Oregon State	W 66–62 ^{OT}	18–8 (13–2)	31 – Ejim	9 – Ejim	4 – Dalton	Gill Coliseum (4,574); Corvallis, OR
February 15, 2025; 1:00 p.m., ESPN+		Loyola Marymount	W 69–57	19–8 (14–2)	16 – Ejim	11 – Little	4 – Dalan	McCarthey Athletic Center (6,000); Spokane, WA
February 20, 2025; 6:00 p.m., SWX/ESPN+		Saint Mary's	W 60–53	20–8 (15–2)	16 – Turner	11 – Little	3 – tied	McCarthey Athletic Center (5,441); Spokane, WA
February 22, 2025; 12:00 p.m., ESPN+		San Francisco	L 68–70	20–9 (15–3)	19 – Ejim	8 – Ejim	5 – Turner	McCarthey Athletic Center (5,540); Spokane, WA
February 27, 2025; 6:00 p.m., ESPN+		at Pacific	W 72–56	21–9 (16–3)	21 – Ejim	9 – Dalton	3 – tied	Alex G. Spanos Center (689); Stockton, CA
March 1, 2025; 2:00 p.m., ESPN+		at Santa Clara	W 68–61	22–9 (17–3)	23 – Turner	6 – Ejim	4 – Ejim	Leavey Center (400); Santa Clara, CA
WCC women's tournament
March 10, 2025; 12:00 p.m., ESPN+	(1)	vs. (4) Oregon State; Semifinals	L 61–63	22–10	18 – Ejim	14 – Ejim	4 – Little	Orleans Arena (2,827); Paradise, NV
WBIT
March 20, 2025*; 6:00 p.m., ESPN+	(4)	UTSA; First round	W 67–51	23–10	24 – Ejim	16 – Ejim	4 – tied	McCarthey Athletic Center (2,571); Spokane, WA
March 23, 2025*; 12:00 p.m., ESPN+	(4)	at (1) Colorado; Second round	W 64–55	24–10	15 – tied	10 – Ejim	tied – 5	CU Events Center (1,860); Boulder, CO
March 27, 2025*; 5:00 p.m., ESPN+	(4)	at (2) Minnesota; Quarterfinals	L 77–82 ^{OT}	24–11	27 – Ejim	15 – Ejim	6 – Bettencourt	Williams Arena (2,451); Minneapolis, MN
*Non-conference game. ^{#}Rankings from AP Poll. (#) Tournament seedings in parentheses. All times are in Pacific Time Zone.

== Rankings ==
Ranking movements Legend: RV = Received votes
	Week																				
Poll	Pre	1	2	3	4	5	6	7	8	9	10	11	12	13	14	15	16	17	18	19	Final
AP	RV																				
Coaches																					

== See also ==
- 2024–25 Gonzaga Bulldogs men's basketball team
