= 2024–25 Pepperdine Waves women's basketball team =

American college basketball season

2024–25 Pepperdine Waves women's basketball
- Conference: West Coast Conference
- Record: 8–22 (3–17 WCC)
- Head coach: Katie Faulkner (1st season)
- Assistant coaches: Erika Bean; Brian Porth; Joslyn Tinkle
- Home arena: Firestone Fieldhouse

2024–25 West Coast Conference women's basketball standings
	Conf.				Overall
Team	W		L	PCT	W		L	PCT
Gonzaga	17	–	3	.850	24	–	11	.686
Portland	17	–	3	.850	31	–	5	.861
Washington State	14	–	6	.700	21	–	14	.600
Oregon State †	12	–	8	.600	19	–	16	.543
San Francisco	11	–	9	.550	15	–	16	.484
Saint Mary's	10	–	10	.500	14	–	17	.452
Pacific	9	–	11	.450	15	–	19	.441
Santa Clara	8	–	12	.400	14	–	17	.452
Loyola Marymount	7	–	13	.350	14	–	16	.467
Pepperdine	3	–	17	.150	8	–	22	.267
San Diego	2	–	18	.100	7	–	24	.226
† 2025 WCC tournament winner

The 2024–25 Pepperdine Waves women's basketball team represented Pepperdine University in the 2024–25 NCAA Division I women's basketball season. The Waves, led by first-year head coach Katie Faulkner, play their homes games at Firestone Fieldhouse and are members of the West Coast Conference.

== Previous season ==
The Waves finished the 2023–24 season 5–25, 1–15 in WCC play to finish in last place. As the No. 9 seed in the WCC tournament, they lost in the second first to BYU.

== Offseason ==
=== Departures ===
Pepperdine departures
Name	Num	Pos.	Height	Year	Hometown	Reason for departure
Mi'Cole Cayton	5	G	5'9"	Graduate student	Stockton, CA	Graduated
Jane Nwaba	10	F	5'10"	Senior	Carson, CA	Transferred to Vanderbilt
Holly Griffiths	12	F	6'4"	Freshman	Melbourne, Australia	Transferred to Saint Mary's
Myra Gordon	15	G/F	6'0"	Graduate student	Fort Worth, TX	Graduated
Jorynn Ross	24	F	6'3"	Freshman	Milwaukee, WI	Transferred to Arizona
Alexis Griggsby	35	G	5'9"	Graduate student	Northridge, CA	Graduated

=== Incoming ===
Pepperdine incoming transfers
Name	Num	Pos.	Height	Year	Hometown	Previous school
Malia Mastora	5	G	5'10"	(redshirt) Senior	Alameda, CA	Cal State San Marcos
Ornela Muca	9	G	5'7"	Graduate student	Athens, Greece	California
Makena Mastora	12	G	5'9"	Senior	Alameda, CA	Saint Mary's

==== Recruiting ====
There was no recruiting class of 2024.

== Roster ==
2024–25 Pepperdine Waves women's basketball team
Players
Coaches

Pos.	#	Name	Height	Year	Previous school	Hometown
G	0	Addi Melone	5 ft 3 in (1.6 m)	Sr	Centennial; Eastern Arizona College	Las Vegas, NV
G	1	Hailey Johnson	5 ft 11 in (1.8 m)	RS So	JSerra Catholic	Coto de Caza, CA
G	2	Chloe Sotell	6 ft 0 in (1.83 m)	Fr	Montverde Academy	Stamford, CT
G	3	Ella Brubaker	6 ft 0 in (1.83 m)	Sr	Curtis; The Master's (CA)	University Place, WA
G	5	Malia Mastora	5 ft 11 in (1.8 m)	RS Sr	St. Joseph Notre Dame; Cal State San Marcos	Alameda, CA
G	9	Ornela Muca	5 ft 7 in (1.7 m)	GS	American Community School of Athens; California	Athens, Greece
G	11	Helena Friend	6 ft 0 in (1.83 m)	Sr	Blair Academy	Huntington Beach, CA
G	12	Makena Mastora	5 ft 9 in (1.75 m)	Sr	St. Joseph Notre Dame; Saint Mary's	Alameda, CA
G	13	Emerita Mashaire	6 ft 0 in (1.83 m)	Sr	HBA-Marsky; Buffalo	Helsinki, Finland
F/C	31	Megan Harkey	6 ft 6 in (1.98 m)	GS	Northwest Guilford; Xavier	Summerfield, NC
F	32	Maggie Vick	6 ft 2 in (1.88 m)	Sr	Lakeway Christian (TN); Iowa State	Morristown, TN
C	33	KK Brodie	6 ft 3 in (1.91 m)	Jr	Rock Bridge	Columbia, MO

Head coach

- Katie Faulkner (Montana)

Assistant coach(es)

- Erika Bean (Utah)
- Brian Porth (SMU)
- Joslyn Tinkle (Stanford)

Legend

- (C) Team captain
- (S) Suspended
- (I) Ineligible
- (W) Walk-on
- Injured
- Current redshirt

Roster

== Schedule and results ==
Date time, TV	Rank^{#}	Opponent^{#}	Result	Record	High points	High rebounds	High assists	Site (attendance) city, state
Exhibition
November 1, 2024*; 6:00 p.m.		Westcliff	W 73–42		–	–	–	Firestone Fieldhouse; Malibu, CA
Non-conference regular season
November 4, 2024*; 6:00 p.m., ESPN+		Cal State Fullerton	W 59–57	1–0	10 – Tied	5 – Tied	3 – Tied	Firestone Fieldhouse (220); Malibu, CA
November 7, 2024*; 11:00 a.m., ESPN+		at UC Irvine	L 56–65	1–1	13 – Mak. Mastora	4 – Tied	3 – Tied	Bren Events Center (1,867); Irvine, CA
November 12, 2024*; 11:30 a.m., B1G+		at No. 5 UCLA	L 54–91	1–2	20 – Muca	3 – Tied	3 – Muca	Pauley Pavilion (3,898); Los Angeles, CA
November 16, 2024*; 11:00 a.m., ESPN+		at California Baptist	W 75–64	2–2	27 – Muca	7 – Tied	2 – Tied	Fowler Events Center (740); Riverside, CA
November 18, 2024*; 6:00 p.m., ESPN+		UC Riverside	W 55–52 ^{OT}	3–2	20 – Brubaker	7 – Harkey	2 – Tied	Firestone Fieldhouse (183); Malibu, CA
November 27, 2024*; 2:00 p.m., ESPN+		at Cal State Northridge	W 84–58	4–2	18 – Mal. Mastora	8 – Mak. Mastora	5 – Mak. Mastora	Premier America Credit Union Arena (500); Northridge, CA
December 1, 2024*; 2:00 p.m., ESPN+		at Cal State Northridge	L 61–68	4–3	20 – Brubaker	7 – Brubaker	3 – Tied	Walter Pyramid (620); Long Beach, CA
December 6, 2024*; 6:00 p.m., ESPN+		Nevada	W 60–58 ^{OT}	5–3	20 – Brubaker	9 – Brubaker	4 – Mak. Mastora	Firestone Fieldhouse (227); Malibu, CA
December 15, 2024*; 1:00 p.m., MW Network		at New Mexico	L 59–82	5–4	24 – Sotell	5 – Tied	5 – Sotell	The Pit (4,575); Albuquerque, NM
WCC regular season
December 21, 2024; 4:00 p.m., ESPN+		Santa Clara	L 69–70	5–5 (0–1)	17 – Brubaker	7 – Harkey	3 – Tied	Firestone Fieldhouse (209); Malibu, CA
December 28, 2024; 12:00 p.m., ESPN+		at Washington State	L 46–67	5–6 (0–2)	15 – Brubaker	7 – Vick	1 – Tied	Beasley Coliseum (924); Pullman, WA
December 30, 2024; 6:00 p.m., ESPN+		at Gonzaga	L 54–75	5–7 (0–3)	17 – Brubaker	6 – Mak. Mastora	7 – Sotell	McCarthey Athletic Center (5,165); Spokane, WA
January 2, 2025; 6:00 p.m., ESPN+		San Diego	W 63–49	6–7 (1–3)	14 – Brubaker	8 – Sotell	7 – Sotell	Firestone Fieldhouse (180); Malibu, CA
January 4, 2025; 2:00 p.m., ESPN+		at San Francisco	L 60–76	6–8 (1–4)	16 – Sotell	7 – Mashaire	3 – Tied	Sobrato Center (203); San Francisco, CA
January 16, 2025; 6:30 p.m., ESPN+		at Saint Mary's	L 41–56	6–9 (1–5)	14 – Mak. Mastora	10 – Mak. Mastora	3 – Brubaker	University Credit Union Pavilion (302); Moraga, CA
January 18, 2025; 2:00 p.m., ESPN+		at San Diego	W 68–66	7–9 (2–5)	17 – Vick	8 – Mak. Mastora	6 – Sotell	Jenny Craig Pavilion (151); San Diego, CA
January 23, 2025; 6:00 p.m., ESPN+		Pacific	L 43–58	7–10 (2–6)	10 – Sotell	9 – Harkey	2 – Tied	Firestone Fieldhouse (165); Malibu, CA
January 25, 2025; 1:00 p.m., ESPN+		Gonzaga	L 53–81	7–11 (2–7)	13 – Mal. Mastora	6 – Mashaire	3 – Tied	Firestone Fieldhouse (160); Malibu, CA
January 28, 2025; 4:00 p.m., ESPN+		Loyola Marymount; Rescheduled from January 11	W 55–43	8–11 (3–7)	22 – Sotell	7 – Vick	4 – Sotell	Firestone Fieldhouse; Malibu, CA
January 30, 2025; 6:00 p.m., ESPN+		at Oregon State	L 54–63	8–12 (3–8)	15 – Muca	7 – Mashaire	4 – Sotell	Gill Coliseum (3,729); Corvallis, OR
February 1, 2025; 5:00 p.m., ESPN+		at Portland	L 52–76	8–13 (3–9)	12 – Tied	8 – Friend	4 – Harkey	Chiles Center (1,240); Portland, OR
February 6, 2025; 6:00 p.m., ESPN+		San Francisco	L 48–72	8–14 (3–10)	13 – Sotell	5 – Vick	3 – Mak. Mastora	Firestone Fieldhouse (160); Malibu, CA
February 8, 2025; 1:00 p.m., ESPN+		at Pacific	L 41–68	8–15 (3–11)	11 – Mak. Mastora	6 – Harkey	3 – Tied	Alex G. Spanos Center (581); Stockton, CA
February 10, 2025; 3:00 p.m., ESPN+		Portland; Reschedule from January 9	L 75–77 ^{OT}	8–16 (3–12)	17 – Sotell	6 – Tied	5 – Sotell	Firestone Fieldhouse (153); Malibu, CA
February 13, 2025; 6:00 p.m., ESPN+		at Santa Clara	L 46–54	8–17 (3–13)	13 – Muca	6 – Tied	3 – Tied	Leavey Center (365); Santa Clara, CA
February 15, 2025; 1:00 p.m., ESPN+		Saint Mary's	L 54–68	8–18 (3–14)	16 – Sotell	6 – Mak. Mastora	4 – Sotell	Firestone Fieldhouse (233); Malibu, CA
February 22, 2025; 2:00 p.m., ESPN+		at Loyola Marymount	L 49–58	8–19 (3–15)	18 – Brubaker	9 – Mak. Mastora	4 – Mak. Mastora	Gersten Pavilion (233); Los Angeles, CA
February 27, 2025; 1:00 p.m., ESPN+		Washington State	L 49–57	8–20 (3–16)	9 – Tied	7 – Mak. Mastora	4 – Sotell	Firestone Fieldhouse (163); Malibu, CA
March 1, 2025; 1:00 p.m., ESPN+		Oregon State	L 46–73	8–21 (3–17)	14 – Muca	5 – Mak. Mastora	3 – Sotell	Firestone Fieldhouse (403); Malibu, CA
WCC women's tournament
March 6, 2025; 12:00 p.m., ESPN+	(10)	vs. (11) San Diego; First Round	L 59–66	8–22	20 – Sotell	5 – Mashaire	4 – Sotell	Orleans Arena; Paradise, NV
*Non-conference game. ^{#}Rankings from AP Poll. (#) Tournament seedings in parentheses. All times are in Pacific Time.

== See also ==
- 2024–25 Pepperdine Waves men's basketball team
