= 2024–25 Washington State Cougars women's basketball team =

American college basketball season

2024–25 Washington State Cougars women's basketball

WNIT, Super 16
- Conference: West Coast Conference
- Record: 21–14 (14–6 WCC)
- Head coach: Kamie Ethridge (7th season)
- Assistant coaches: Laurie Koehn; Camille Williams; Matt Smith
- Home arena: Beasley Coliseum

2024–25 West Coast Conference women's basketball standings
| | Conf. | | | | Overall |
| Team | W | | L | PCT | W | | L | PCT |
|---|---|---|---|---|---|---|---|---|
| Gonzaga | 17 | – | 3 | .850 | 24 | – | 11 | .686 |
| Portland | 17 | – | 3 | .850 | 31 | – | 5 | .861 |
| Washington State | 14 | – | 6 | .700 | 21 | – | 14 | .600 |
| Oregon State † | 12 | – | 8 | .600 | 19 | – | 16 | .543 |
| San Francisco | 11 | – | 9 | .550 | 15 | – | 16 | .484 |
| Saint Mary's | 10 | – | 10 | .500 | 14 | – | 17 | .452 |
| Pacific | 9 | – | 11 | .450 | 15 | – | 19 | .441 |
| Santa Clara | 8 | – | 12 | .400 | 14 | – | 17 | .452 |
| Loyola Marymount | 7 | – | 13 | .350 | 14 | – | 16 | .467 |
| Pepperdine | 3 | – | 17 | .150 | 8 | – | 22 | .267 |
| San Diego | 2 | – | 18 | .100 | 7 | – | 24 | .226 |
† 2025 WCC tournament winner

The 2024–25 Washington State Cougars women's basketball team represented Washington State University during the 2024–25 NCAA Division I women's basketball season. The Cougars were led by seventh-year head coach Kamie Ethridge, and played their home games at Beasley Coliseum as affiliate members of the West Coast Conference.

== Previous season ==
The Cougars went 21–15, 7–11 in Pac-12 play to finish in a tie for eighth place. As a No. 9 seed in the Pac-12 women's tournament, they lost in the first round to California. They received an at-large bid to the WBIT as a No. 1 seed in the Washington State bracket, where they defeated Lamar in the first round, Santa Clara in the second round and Toledo in the quarterfinals, before losing to Illinois in the semifinals.

This was the team's final season as a Pac-12 member, as they would join West Coast Conference as affiliate member for the next two years.

== Offseason ==
=== Departures ===
Washington State departures
| Name | Num | Pos. | Height | Year | Hometown | Reason for departure |
|---|---|---|---|---|---|---|
| Charlisse Leger-Walker | 5 | G | 5'10" | Senior | Waikato, New Zealand | Transferred to UCLA |
| Jessica Clarke | 14 | C | 6'3" | Senior | North Vancouver, BC | Transferred to British Columbia |
| Johanna Teder | 21 | G | 5'8" | Graduate student | Tartu, Estonia | Transferred to Colorado |
| Beyonce Bea | 25 | G/F | 6'1" | Graduate student | Washougal, WA | Graduated/signed to play professionally in Belgium with AB Contern |
| Cia Eklöf | 45 | G | 5'10" | (redshirt) Freshman | Helsinki, Finland | Transferred to Rhode Island |
| Bella Murekatete | 55 | C | 6'3" | Graduate student | Ngoma Huye, Nigeria | Graduated/undrafted in 2024 WNBA draft; signed with the Phoenix Mercury |

=== Incoming ===
Washington State incoming transfers
| Name | Num | Pos. | Height | Year | Hometown | Previous school |
|---|---|---|---|---|---|---|
| Jean Chiu | 5 | G | 5'7" | Junior | Taipei, Taiwan | Taipei |

==== Recruiting ====
There was no recruiting class of 2024.

== Roster ==
2024–25 Washington State Cougars women's basketball team
Players
Coaches

| Pos. | # | Name | Height | Year | Previous school | Hometown |
|---|---|---|---|---|---|---|
| G | 1 | Tara Wallack | 6 ft 2 in (1.88 m) | Sr | Semiahmoo Secondary | South Surrey, BC |
| C | 3 | Candace Kpetikou | 6 ft 3 in (1.91 m) | RS Fr | Saint Joseph HS | Niamey, Niger |
| G | 5 | Jean Chiu | 5 ft 7 in (1.7 m) | Jr | New Taipei Municipal Tam-Shui Vocational HS; Taipei | Taipei, Taiwan |
| G | 7 | Alice Dart | 5 ft 10 in (1.78 m) | Fr | Moreton Bay College | Brisbane, Australia |
| G | 8 | Marta Alsina | 5 ft 11 in (1.8 m) | Fr | Institut Joaquim Blume | Barcelona, Spain |
| G | 10 | Eleonora Villa | 5 ft 8 in (1.73 m) | So | Costa Masnaga | Lissone, Italy |
| G | 11 | Astera Tuhina | 5 ft 9 in (1.75 m) | Jr | Deportivo Promete | Pristina, Kosovo |
| G | 12 | Kyra Gardner | 5 ft 11 in (1.8 m) | Jr | Raymond HS | Raymond, WA |
| F | 13 | Dayana Mendes | 6 ft 2 in (1.88 m) | Fr | INSEP | Paris, France |
| G/F | 15 | Keandra Koorits | 6 ft 2 in (1.88 m) | Fr | Audentes Sports Gymnasium | Tallinn, Estonia |
| G | 19 | Charlotte Abraham | 6 ft 0 in (1.83 m) | Fr | Lycée Marguerite de Flandre | Cambrai, France |
| C | 33 | Alex Covill | 6 ft 6 in (1.98 m) | So | Hellgate HS | Missoula, MT |
| G | 34 | Jenna Villa | 6 ft 1 in (1.85 m) | So | Arlington HS | Arlington, WA |

Head coach

- Kamie Ethridge (Texas)

Assistant coach(es)

- Laurie Koehn (Kansas State)
- Camille Williams (Wisconsin)
- Matt Smith

Legend

- (C) Team captain
- (S) Suspended
- (I) Ineligible
- (W) Walk-on
- Injured
- Current redshirt

Roster

== Schedule and results ==
| Date time, TV | Rank^{#} | Opponent^{#} | Result | Record | High points | High rebounds | High assists | Site (attendance) city, state |
Exhibition
| October 20, 2024*; 12:00 p.m. | | Lewis–Clark State College | W 99–54 | | – | – | – | Beasley Coliseum; Pullman, WA |
Non-conference regular season
| November 4, 2024*; 4:00 p.m., ESPN+ | | Eastern Washington | W 83–82 ^{OT} | 1–0 | 21 – Wallack | 7 – Tuhina | 5 – Wallack | Beasley Coliseum (906); Pullman, WA |
| November 7, 2024*; 7:00 p.m., ACCNX | | at Stanford | L 65–94 | 1–1 | 19 – E. Villa | 4 – Tied | 4 – E. Villa | Maples Pavilion (2,428); Stanford, CA |
| November 10, 2024*; 12:00 p.m., ESPN+ | | Idaho; Battle of the Palouse | W 71–60 | 2–1 | 14 – Wallack | 8 – Wallack | 5 – E. Villa | Beasley Coliseum (1,114); Pullman, WA |
| November 16, 2024*; 4:00 p.m., ESPN+ | | at Texas Tech | L 52–56 | 2–2 | 12 – E. Villa | 8 – Wallack | 3 – E. Villa | United Supermarkets Arena (4,467); Lubbock, TX |
| November 24, 2024*; 1:00 p.m., BTN | | at Iowa | L 43–72 | 2–3 | 11 – Tied | 7 – Tied | 3 – Tuhina | Carver–Hawkeye Arena (14,998); Iowa City, IA |
| November 28, 2024*; 1:00 p.m., FloSports | | vs. Norfolk State; Puerto Rico Shootout | W 68–60 | 3–3 | 22 – Wallack | 10 – Mendes | 5 – J. Villa | Roberto Clemente Coliseum (250); San Juan, PR |
| November 29, 2024*; 1:00 p.m., FloSports | | vs. Virginia; Puerto Rico Shootout | W 75–74 | 4–3 | 17 – E. Villa | 7 – Tied | 5 – E. Villa | Roberto Clemente Coliseum (250); San Juan, PR |
| November 30, 2024*; 12:00 p.m., FloSports | | vs. Drake; Puerto Rico Shootout | L 68–79 | 4–4 | 21 – Wallack | 7 – Covill | 5 – Tied | Roberto Clemente Coliseum (250); San Juan, PR |
| December 4, 2024*; 6:00 p.m., B1G+ | | at Oregon | L 70–85 | 4–5 | 18 – E. Villa | 7 – Tied | 5 – E. Villa | Matthew Knight Arena (4,756); Eugene, OR |
| December 13, 2024*; 6:00 p.m., ESPN+ | | BYU | L 57–72 | 4–6 | 16 – Wallack | 8 – Tied | 4 – Tuhina | Beasley Coliseum (901); Pullman, WA |
| December 15, 2024*; 12:00 p.m., ESPN+ | | Saint Martin's | W 76–48 | 5–6 | 20 – E. Villa | 10 – Kpetikou | 6 – Tuhina | Beasley Coliseum (839); Pullman, WA |
WCC regular season
| December 19, 2024; 6:00 p.m., ESPN+ | | at San Diego | W 65–42 | 6–6 (1–0) | 13 – Wallack | 5 – Tied | 4 – Wallack | Jenny Craig Pavilion (203); San Diego, CA |
| December 28, 2024; 12:00 p.m., ESPN+ | | Pepperdine | W 67–46 | 7–6 (2–0) | 12 – Tied | 6 – Tied | 5 – Alsina | Beasley Coliseum (924); Pullman, WA |
| December 30, 2024; 12:00 p.m., ESPN+ | | at Pacific | W 74–66 | 8–6 (3–0) | 20 – E. Villa | 9 – Wallack | 5 – Wallack | Alex G. Spanos Center (540); Stockton, CA |
| January 2, 2025; 6:00 p.m., ESPN+ | | Santa Clara | L 62–68 | 8–7 (3–1) | 15 – Covill | 10 – Wallack | 6 – Tuhina | Beasley Coliseum (865); Pullman, WA |
| January 4, 2025; 12:00 p.m., ESPN+ | | Oregon State | W 66–52 | 9–7 (4–1) | 19 – E. Villa | 14 – Wallack | 7 – Tuhina | Beasley Coliseum (997); Pullman, WA |
| January 9, 2025; 6:30 p.m., ESPN+ | | at Saint Mary's | W 66–57 | 10–7 (5–1) | 16 – E. Villa | 8 – Mendes | 3 – Tied | University Credit Union Pavilion (312); Moraga, CA |
| January 11, 2025; 12:00 p.m., ESPN+ | | Gonzaga | L 61–69 | 10–8 (5–2) | 24 – E. Villa | 4 – Tied | 6 – Tuhina | Beasley Coliseum (1,639); Pullman, WA |
| January 16, 2025; 6:00 p.m., ESPN+ | | at San Francisco | W 74–58 | 11–8 (6–2) | 16 – Wallack | 9 – Wallack | 7 – Tuhina | Sobrato Center; San Francisco, CA |
| January 18, 2025; 2:00 p.m., ESPN+ | | at Santa Clara | W 74–47 | 12–8 (7–2) | 21 – Covill | 8 – Tied | 5 – Tuhina | Leavey Center (299); Santa Clara, CA |
| January 23, 2025; 6:00 p.m., ESPN+ | | Portland | L 65–83 | 12–9 (7–3) | 13 – E. Villa | 6 – Tied | 4 – Tuhina | Beasley Coliseum (1,015); Pullman, WA |
| January 25, 2025; 2:00 p.m., ESPN+ | | at Loyola Marymount | L 76–79 | 12–10 (7–4) | 13 – Tied | 8 – Covill | 4 – Covill | Gersten Pavilion (313); Los Angeles, CA |
| January 27, 2025; 7:00 p.m., ESPN+ | | at Oregon State | W 65–57 | 13–10 (8–4) | 12 – Wallack | 8 – Kpetikou | 4 – E. Villa | Gill Coliseum (3,844); Corvallis, OR |
| January 30, 2025; 6:00 p.m., ESPN+ | | Pacific | W 82–70 | 14–10 (9–4) | 23 – E. Villa | 9 – Wallack | 4 – Tuhina | Beasley Coliseum (1,034); Pullman, WA |
| February 1, 2025; 12:00 p.m., ESPN+ | | San Diego | W 67–60 | 15–10 (10–4) | 22 – Wallack | 10 – Mendes | 3 – J. Villa | Beasley Coliseum (1,203); Pullman, WA |
| February 8, 2025; 2:00 p.m., ESPN+ | | at Gonzaga | L 69–73 ^{OT} | 15–11 (10–5) | 18 – Wallack | 7 – Tuhina | 6 – Tuhina | McCarthey Athletic Center (6,000); Spokane, WA |
| February 13, 2025; 6:00 p.m., ESPN+ | | Loyola Marymount | W 63–51 | 16–11 (11–5) | 15 – Tuhina | 11 – Mendes | 3 – Wallack | Beasley Coliseum (890); Pullman, WA |
| February 15, 2025; 3:00 p.m., ESPN+ | | at Portland | L 79–84 | 16–12 (11–6) | 16 – E. Villa | 8 – Mendes | 8 – Wallack | Chiles Center (1,518); Portland, OR |
| February 20, 2025; 6:00 p.m., ESPN+ | | San Francisco | W 67–59 | 17–12 (12–6) | 20 – Wallack | 12 – Wallack | 6 – Tuhina | Beasley Coliseum (1,072); Pullman, WA |
| February 22, 2025; 11:00 a.m., ESPN+ | | Saint Mary's | W 72–62 | 18–12 (13–6) | 16 – Mendes | 6 – Mendes | 5 – Wallack | Beasley Coliseum (1,467); Pullman, WA |
| February 27, 2025; 1:00 p.m., ESPN+ | | at Pepperdine | W 57–49 | 19–12 (14–6) | 14 – Mendes | 10 – Wallack | 6 – E. Villa | Firestone Fieldhouse (163); Malibu, CA |
WCC Women's Tournament
| March 9, 2025; 2:00 p.m., ESPN+ | (3) | vs. (7) Pacific; Quarterfinals | W 73–62 | 20–12 | 18 – Tuhina | 7 – Covill | 6 – Tuhina | Orleans Arena (1,505); Paradise, NV |
| March 10, 2025; 2:30 p.m., ESPN+ | (3) | vs. (2) Portland; Semifinals | L 57–72 | 20–13 | 11 – Tied | 13 – Mendes | 5 – Tuhina | Orleans Arena (2,936); Paradise, NV |
WNIT
| March 24, 2025*; 6:00 p.m., ESPN+ | | Utah Valley; 2nd Round | W 57–54 | 21–13 | 15 – E. Villa | 11 – Mendes | 3 – Tuhina | Beasley Coliseum (1,853); Pullman, WA |
| March 27, 2025*; 5:00 p.m., WDAY+ | | at North Dakota State; Super 16 | L 51–59 | 21–14 | 14 – Tied | 10 – Tuhina | 3 – Tied | Scheels Center (1,239); Fargo, ND |
*Non-conference game. ^{#}Rankings from AP Poll. (#) Tournament seedings in parentheses. All times are in Pacific Time.

== Rankings ==
Ranking movements
| | Week | | | | | | | | | | | | | | | | | | | | |
| Poll | Pre | 1 | 2 | 3 | 4 | 5 | 6 | 7 | 8 | 9 | 10 | 11 | 12 | 13 | 14 | 15 | 16 | 17 | 18 | 19 | Final |
|---|---|---|---|---|---|---|---|---|---|---|---|---|---|---|---|---|---|---|---|---|---|
| AP | | | | | | | | | | | | | | | | | | | | | Not released |
| Coaches | | | | | | | | | | | | | | | | | | | | | |

== See also ==
- 2024–25 Washington State Cougars men's basketball team
