= 2025–26 San Diego State Aztecs women's basketball team =

American college basketball season

2025–26 San Diego State Aztecs women's basketball

Mountain West regular season champions

WBIT, Quarterfinals
- Conference: Mountain West Conference
- Record: 27–6 (19–1 MW)
- Head coach: Stacie Terry-Hutson (13th season)
- Associate head coach: Kellie Lewis
- Assistant coaches: Gregg Gottlieb; Mel Boscarino; Justin Hutson; John Smith
- Home arena: Viejas Arena

2025–26 Mountain West Conference women's basketball standings
	Conf.				Overall
Team	W		L	PCT	W		L	PCT
San Diego State	19	–	1	.950	27	–	5	.844
UNLV	15	–	5	.750	21	–	11	.656
Colorado State †	15	–	5	.750	27	–	8	.771
New Mexico	14	–	6	.700	22	–	10	.688
Boise State	14	–	6	.700	25	–	9	.735
Grand Canyon	11	–	9	.550	13	–	19	.406
Fresno State	8	–	12	.400	15	–	18	.455
Wyoming	7	–	13	.350	10	–	20	.333
Air Force	7	–	13	.350	16	–	19	.457
Nevada	6	–	14	.300	10	–	21	.323
Utah State	2	–	18	.100	6	–	24	.200
San Jose State	2	–	18	.100	4	–	28	.125
† 2026 Mountain West tournament winner As of March 22, 2026

The 2025–26 San Diego State Aztecs women's basketball team represents San Diego State University during the 2025–26 NCAA Division I women's basketball season. The Aztecs, led by 13th-year head coach Stacie Terry-Hutson, play their home games at Viejas Arena in San Diego, California as members of the Mountain West Conference.

This season will mark San Diego State's last season as members of the Mountain West Conference, as they will be joining the newly reformed Pac-12 Conference, effective July 1, 2026.

== Previous season ==
The Aztecs finished the 2024–25 season 25–10, 11–7 in Mountain West play, to finish in a tie for fourth place. They defeated New Mexico, top-seeded UNLV, and Wyoming to win the Mountain West tournament championship, sending the Aztecs to their first NCAA tournament appearance since 2012. In the tournament, they would receive the No. 14 seed in the Spokane Regional 1, where they would be defeated by No. 3 seed LSU in the First Round.

== Preseason ==
On October 22, 2025, the Mountain West Conference released their preseason poll. San Diego State was picked to finish second in the conference, with three first-place votes.

=== Preseason rankings ===
MW Preseason Poll
Place	Team	Votes
1	UNLV	281 (19)
2	San Diego State	240 (3)
3	Colorado State	236 (1)
4	Boise State	210 (1)
5	New Mexico	207 (2)
6	Wyoming	194
7	Grand Canyon	177 (1)
8	Air Force	132
9	Fresno State	95
10	Nevada	92
11	Utah State	54
12	San Jose State	44
(#) first-place votes

=== Preseason All-MW Team ===
Preseason All-MW Team
Position	Player	Year
Guard	Naomi Panganiban	Sophomore

=== Preseason Freshman of the Year ===
Preseason Freshman of the Year
Player	Year	Position
Kendall Mosley	Freshman	Guard

== Roster ==
2025–26 San Diego State Aztecs women's basketball team
Players
Coaches

Pos.	#	Name	Height	Year	Previous school	Hometown
F	0	Kennedy Lee	6 ft 0 in (1.83 m)	Jr	Nevada	Louisville, Kentucky
G	1	Kendall Mosley	5 ft 11 in (1.8 m)	Fr	Prosper High School	Prosper, Texas
G	2	Ellie Chen	5 ft 5 in (1.65 m)	Jr	La Salle College Prep	South Pasadena, California
G	3	Alyssa Jackson	5 ft 11 in (1.8 m)	So	Vanden High School	Fairfield, California
G	4	CJ Latta	5 ft 10 in (1.78 m)	So	Utah State	Paul, Idaho
G/F	6	Sofia Kelemeni	6 ft 0 in (1.83 m)	Sr	San Jose State	Kavala, Greece
C	8	Aubrey Cook	6 ft 4 in (1.93 m)	Fr	Legend High School	Parker, Colorado
G	10	Nat Martinez	5 ft 7 in (1.7 m)	So	Piedmont High School	San Leandro, California
G	12	Kaelyn Hamilton	5 ft 9 in (1.75 m)	So	McKinney North High School	McKinney, Texas
F	13	Maria Konstantinidou	6 ft 2 in (1.88 m)	Jr	Fresno State	Thessaloniki, Greece
G	14	Nala Williams	5 ft 8 in (1.73 m)	Sr	Cal State Dominguez Hills	Long Beach, California
F	20	Bailey Barnhard	6 ft 1 in (1.85 m)	So	Del Norte High School	San Diego, California
G	24	Naomi Panganiban	5 ft 7 in (1.7 m)	So	La Jolla Country Day School	San Diego, California

Head coach

- Stacie Terry-Hutson (UT Arlington)

Assistant coach(es)

- Kellie Lewis (Boise State)
- Gregg Gottlieb (UCLA)
- Mel Boscarino (Dominican (CA))
- Justin Hutson (Cal State Bakersfield)
- John Smith (Dominican (CA))

Legend

- (C) Team captain
- (S) Suspended
- (I) Ineligible
- (W) Walk-on
- Injured
- Current redshirt

Roster
Last update: January 15, 2026

== Schedule and results ==
Date time, TV	Rank^{#}	Opponent^{#}	Result	Record	High points	High rebounds	High assists	Site (attendance) city, state
Non-conference regular season
November 3, 2025*; 7:00 pm, B1G+		vs. No. 3 UCLA; Orange County Hoops Classic	L 53–77	0–1	11 – Hamilton	7 – Barnhard	5 – Panganiban	Honda Center (1,500); Anaheim, CA
November 8, 2025*; 3:00 pm, MWN		Cal State San Marcos	W 95–35	1–1	14 – Martinez	6 – Tied	5 – Williams	Viejas Arena (2,528); San Diego, CA
November 12, 2025*; 6:00 pm, MWN		Cal State Northridge	W 91–70	2–1	24 – Lee	6 – Tied	6 – Williams	Viejas Arena (1,220); San Diego, CA
November 15, 2025*; 1:00 pm, MWN		Cal State Bakersfield	W 78–48	3–1	25 – Williams	10 – Williams	5 – Martinez	Viejas Arena (2,101); San Diego, CA
November 19, 2025*; 11:00 am, MWN		Santa Clara	L 47−72	3−2	12 – Tied	7 – Barnhard	3 – Martinez	Viejas Arena (3,707); San Diego, CA
November 22, 2025*; 12:30 pm		vs. Maryland Eastern Shore; Battle 4 Atlantis	W 58−45	4−2	13 – Barnhard	8 – Barnhard	8 – Williams	Imperial Arena (201); Paradise Island, Bahamas
November 24, 2025*; 9:00 am		vs. Penn State; Battle 4 Atlantis	L 67–83	4–3	24 – Martinez	5 – Barnhard	4 – Williams	Imperial Arena (367); Paradise Island, Bahamas
December 7, 2025*; 1:00 pm, MWN		Pacific	W 70–68	5–3	17 – Panganiban	8 – Williams	4 – Martinez	Viejas Arena (2,365); San Diego, CA
December 10, 2025*; 9:00 am, ESPN+		at Kansas State	W 64–53	6–3	22 – Martinez	7 – Tied	4 – Panganiban	Bramlage Coliseum (6,824); Manhattan, KS
Mountain West regular season
December 17, 2025; 6:30 pm, MWN		at Fresno State	W 63–53	7–3 (1–0)	15 – Panganiban	6 – Lee	2 – Tied	Save Mart Center (1,015); Fresno, CA
December 20, 2025; 1:00 pm, MWN		Boise State	W 83–54	8–3 (2–0)	18 – Panganiban	7 – Konstantinidou	5 – Williams	Viejas Arena (1,183); San Diego, CA
December 31, 2025; 1:00 pm, MWN		Air Force	W 62−51	9−3 (3–0)	12 – Williams	7 – Jackson	3 – Tied	Viejas Arena (1,274); San Diego, CA
January 3, 2026; 1:00 pm, MWN		at Wyoming	W 72–55	10–3 (4–0)	21 – Barnhard	5 – Tied	4 – Martinez	Arena-Auditorium (2,713); Laramie, WY
January 7, 2026; 6:00 pm, MWN		Grand Canyon	W 87–69	11–3 (5–0)	18 – Lee	9 – Lee	6 – Williams	Viejas Arena (1,161); San Diego, CA
January 10, 2026; 12:00 pm, MWN		at Utah State	W 73–72	12–3 (6–0)	23 – Panganiban	7 – Lee	4 – Tied	Smith Spectrum (678); Logan, UT
January 14, 2026; 11:00 am, MWN		New Mexico	W 73–56	13–3 (7–0)	15 – Lee	9 – Lee	5 – Williams	Viejas Arena (8,054); San Diego, CA
January 17, 2026; 2:00 pm, MWN		at UNLV	W 75–66 ^{OT}	14–3 (8–0)	20 – Panganiban	6 – Jackson	7 – Williams	Cox Pavilion (883); Paradise, NV
January 24, 2026; 1:00 pm, MWN		San Jose State	W 94–66	15–3 (9–0)	20 – Williams	12 – Lee	10 – Williams	Viejas Arena (1,701); San Diego, CA
January 28, 2026; 10:00 am, MWN		at Colorado State	W 46–44	16–3 (10–0)	15 – Hamilton	11 – Jackson	2 – Williams	Moby Arena (5,582); Fort Collins, CO
January 31, 2026; 1:00 pm, MWN		Nevada	W 67–54	17–3 (11–0)	16 – Panganiban	6 – Konstantinidou	3 – Tied	Viejas Arena (2,166); San Diego, CA
February 4, 2026; 5:00 pm, MWN		at Grand Canyon	L 44–57	17–4 (11–1)	15 – Panganiban	7 – Jackson	3 – Williams	Global Credit Union Arena (643); Phoenix, AZ
February 7, 2026; 2:00 pm, MWN		at San Jose State	W 81–52	18–4 (12–1)	16 – Lee	6 – Barnhard	4 – Tied	Provident Credit Union Event Center (633); San Jose, CA
February 11, 2026; 6:00 pm, MWN		Colorado State	W 64–61	19–4 (13–1)	15 – Hamilton	7 – Konstantinidou	3 – Williams	Viejas Arena (1,358); San Diego, CA
February 14, 2026; 1:00 pm, MWN		at Nevada	W 78–64	20–4 (14–1)	12 – Tied	5 – Tied	4 – Barnard	Lawlor Events Center (1,604); Reno, NV
February 18, 2026; 6:00 pm, MWN		UNLV	W 80–62	21–4 (15–1)	20 – Panganiban	11 – Williams	5 – Williams	Viejas Arena (2,135); San Diego, CA
February 21, 2026; 1:00 pm, MWN		Fresno State	W 68–59	22–4 (16–1)	14 – Williams	6 – Lee	6 – Williams	Viejas Arena (1,961); San Diego, CA
February 25, 2026; 5:30 pm, MWN		at Boise State	W 66–64	23–4 (17–1)	19 – Panganiban	6 – Tied	3 – Tied	ExtraMile Arena (2,321); Boise, ID
February 28, 2026; 1:00 pm, MWN		Wyoming	W 70–51	24–4 (18–1)	20 – Panganiban	6 – Barnhard	6 – Williams	Viejas Arena; San Diego, CA
March 3, 2026; 3:00 pm, MWN		at Air Force	W 74–57	25–4 (19–1)	22 – Martinez	8 – Lee	6 – Williams	Clune Arena (923); Air Force Academy, CO
Mountain West tournament
March 8, 2026; 12:00 p.m., MWN	(1)	vs. (9) Air Force; Quarterfinals	L 76–83	25–5	29 – Panganiban	5 – Barnhard	6 – Panganiban	Thomas & Mack Center (1,545); Paradise, NV
WBIT tournament
March 19, 2026*; 6:00 p.m., ESPN+	(4)	vs. UC Irvine; First Round	W 61–55	26–5	22 – Panganiban	9 – Barnhard	5 – Barnhard	Jenny Craig Pavilion (858); San Diego, CA
March 22, 2026*; 2:00 p.m., ESPN+	(4)	vs. McNeese; Second Round	W 56–41	27–5	11 – Barnhard	8 – Hamilton	5 – Williams	Jenny Craig Pavilion (812); San Diego, CA
March 26, 2026*; 4:30 p.m., ESPN+	(4)	at (2) Kansas; Quarterfinals	L 78–85	27–6	— – —	— – —	— – —	Allen Fieldhouse; Lawrence, KS
*Non-conference game. ^{#}Rankings from AP Poll. (#) Tournament seedings in parentheses. All times are in Pacific.
