= 2024–25 San Diego State Aztecs women's basketball team =

American college basketball season

2024–25 San Diego State Aztecs women's basketball

Mountain West tournament champions

NCAA tournament, First Round
- Conference: Mountain West Conference
- Record: 25–10 (11–7 MW)
- Head coach: Stacie Terry-Hutson (12th season)
- Associate head coach: Kellie Lewis
- Assistant coaches: Jon Silver; Gregg Gottlieb; Mel Boscarino; Justin Hutson
- Home arena: Viejas Arena

2024–25 Mountain West Conference women's basketball standings
	Conf.				Overall
Team	W		L	PCT	W		L	PCT
UNLV	16	–	2	.889	26	–	8	.765
Wyoming	14	–	4	.778	22	–	12	.647
Colorado State	13	–	5	.722	22	–	10	.688
San Diego State †	11	–	7	.611	25	–	10	.714
New Mexico	11	–	7	.611	18	–	14	.563
Fresno State	8	–	10	.444	19	–	15	.559
Air Force	7	–	11	.389	18	–	15	.545
Boise State	7	–	11	.389	18	–	15	.545
Nevada	6	–	12	.333	11	–	21	.344
Utah State	3	–	15	.167	4	–	27	.129
San Jose State	3	–	15	.167	10	–	22	.313
† 2025 Mountain West tournament winner

The 2024–25 San Diego State Aztecs women's basketball team represented San Diego State University during the 2024–25 NCAA Division I women's basketball season. The Aztecs, led by 12th-year head coach Stacie Terry-Hutson, played their home games at Viejas Arena in San Diego, California, as members of the Mountain West Conference.

== Previous season ==
The Aztecs finished the 2023–24 season 22–13, 10–8 in Mountain West play to finish in a four-way tie for fourth place. They lost in the championship of the Mountain West Conference Women's Basketball tournament to UNLV.

== Roster ==
2024–25 San Diego State Aztecs women's basketball team
Players
Coaches

Pos.	#	Name	Height	Year	Previous school	Hometown
G	0	Khylee Pepe	5 ft 11 in (1.8 m)	Sr	Bishop Montgomery High School	Long Beach, California
G	1	Erin Houpt	5 ft 6 in (1.68 m)	Jr	Mercer	Danville, Illinois
G	2	Ellie Chen	5 ft 5 in (1.65 m)	So	La Salle College Prep	South Pasadena, California
G	3	Alyssa Jackson	5 ft 11 in (1.8 m)	So	Vanden High School	Fairfield, California
G	4	Veronica Sheffey	5 ft 9 in (1.75 m)	Jr	San Diego	Woodinville, Washington
G	5	Trinity Zamora	6 ft 0 in (1.83 m)	RS Fr	Piedmont High School	Oakland, California
G	10	Mia Davis	6 ft 0 in (1.83 m)	So	Dream City Christian	Phoenix, Arizona
G	11	Jazlen Green	5 ft 11 in (1.8 m)	Sr	California	Upland, California
G	12	Kaelyn Hamilton	5 ft 9 in (1.75 m)	Fr	McKinney North High School	McKinney, Texas
G	13	Meghan Fiso	5 ft 10 in (1.78 m)	Sr	Michigan	Seattle, Washington
F	20	Bailey Barnhard	6 ft 1 in (1.85 m)	Fr	Del Norte High School	San Diego, California
G	21	Nat Martinez	5 ft 7 in (1.7 m)	Fr	Piedmont High School	San Leandro, California
G	22	Natalija Grizelj	5 ft 9 in (1.75 m)	Jr	Saint Francis High School	Sunnyvale, California
F	23	Kim Villalobos	6 ft 0 in (1.83 m)	Sr	Chaminade College Prep	Los Angeles, California
G	24	Naomi Panganiban	5 ft 7 in (1.7 m)	Fr	La Jolla Country Day School	San Diego, California
F	31	Cali Clark	6 ft 3 in (1.91 m)	Sr	Colorado State	Centennial, Colorado
F	32	Adryana Quezada	5 ft 10 in (1.78 m)	Sr	Utah State	Frisco, Texas

Head coach

- Stacie Terry-Hutson (UT Arlington)

Assistant coach(es)

- Kellie Lewis (Boise State)
- Jon Silver (UCLA)
- Gregg Gottlieb (UCLA)
- Mel Boscarino (Dominican (CA))
- Justin Hutson (Cal State Bakersfield)

Legend

- (C) Team captain
- (S) Suspended
- (I) Ineligible
- (W) Walk-on
- Injured
- Current redshirt

Roster
Last update: December 11, 2024

== Schedule and results ==
Date time, TV	Rank^{#}	Opponent^{#}	Result	Record	Site (attendance) city, state
Non-conference regular season
November 4, 2024*; 6:00 pm		Cal State San Marcos	W 76–48	1–0	Viejas Arena (806); San Diego, CA
November 8, 2024*; 5:00 pm, ESPN+		at UC Davis	W 83–77 ^{OT}	2–0	University Credit Union Center (712); Davis, CA
November 11, 2024*; 6:00 pm		Idaho State	W 62–51	3–0	Viejas Arena (917); San Diego, CA
November 16, 2024*; 1:00 pm, MW Network		San Francisco	W 73–62	4–0	Viejas Arena (990); San Diego, CA
November 20, 2024*; 5:00 pm, ESPN+		at California Baptist	W 78–66	5–0	Fowler Events Center (758); Riverside, CA
November 22, 2024*; 6:00 pm, ESPN+		at Cal State Bakersfield	W 88–46	6–0	Icardo Center; Bakersfield, CA
November 28, 2024*; 10:30 am, FloHoops		vs. Wisconsin; Cancún Challenge Mayan Division	W 73–67	7–0	Hard Rock Hotel Riviera Maya (250); Cancún, Mexico
November 29, 2024*; 10:30 am, FloHoops		vs. VCU; Cancún Challenge Mayan Division	W 55–46	8–0	Hard Rock Hotel Riviera Maya (211); Cancún, Mexico
November 30, 2024*; 8:00 am, FloHoops		vs. Providence; Cancún Challenge Mayan Division	L 54–55	8–1	Hard Rock Hotel Riviera Maya (100); Cancún, Mexico
December 6, 2024*; 11:00 am, ESPN+		Bethesda	W 107–36	9–1	Viejas Arena (6,906); San Diego, CA
December 11, 2024*; 6:00 pm, ESPN+		at Cal State Fullerton	W 61–58	10–1	Titan Gym (234); Fullerton, CA
December 19, 2024*; 3:30 pm, MW Network		Stephen F. Austin; San Diego Classic	L 80–89 ^{2OT}	10–2	Viejas Arena (724); San Diego, CA
December 21, 2024*; 3:30 pm, MW Network		Hawaii; San Diego Classic	W 54–52	11–2	Viejas Arena (1,410); San Diego, CA
Mountain West regular season
December 29, 2024; 1:00 pm, MW Network		Boise State	W 74–59	12–2 (1–0)	Viejas Arena (2,565); San Diego, CA
January 1, 2025; 12:00 pm, MW Network		at Colorado State	L 56–67	12–3 (1–1)	Moby Arena (1,480); Fort Collins, CO
January 4, 2025; 1:00 pm, MW Network		New Mexico	L 59–68	12–4 (1–2)	Viejas Arena (1,529); San Diego, CA
January 8, 2025; 6:30 pm, MW Network		at Nevada	W 81–62	13–4 (2–2)	Lawlor Events Center (1,228); Reno, NV
January 11, 2025; 1:00 pm, MW Network		at Wyoming	L 71–78	13–5 (2–3)	Arena-Auditorium (2,344); Laramie, WY
January 15, 2025; 6:00 pm, MW Network		Colorado State	L 58–62	13–6 (2–4)	Viejas Arena (1,353); San Diego, CA
January 18, 2025; 1:00 pm, MW Network		at Utah State	W 85–66	14–6 (3–4)	Smith Spectrum (519); Logan, UT
January 22, 2025; 6:00 pm, MW Network		San Jose State	L 57–68	14–7 (3–5)	Viejas Arena (1,191); San Diego, CA
January 25, 2025; 1:00 pm, MW Network		UNLV	W 59–58	15–7 (4–5)	Viejas Arena (2,154); San Diego, CA
February 1, 2025; 1:00 pm, MW Network		at New Mexico	W 59–46	16–7 (5–5)	The Pit (5,186); Albuquerque, NM
February 5, 2025; 6:00 pm, MW Network		at Fresno State	W 61–57	17–7 (6–5)	Save Mart Center (961); Fresno, CA
February 8, 2025; 1:00 pm, MW Network		Wyoming	L 51–64	17–8 (6–6)	Viejas Arena (1,830); San Diego, CA
February 12, 2025; 6:30 pm, MW Network		at UNLV	L 65–75	17–9 (6–7)	Cox Pavilion (928); Paradise, NV
February 15, 2025; 1:00 pm, MW Network		Utah State	W 78–63	18–9 (7–7)	Viejas Arena (1,456); San Diego, CA
February 19, 2025; 11:00 am, MW Network		Nevada	W 72–43	19–9 (8–7)	Viejas Arena (4,088); San Diego, CA
February 22, 2025; 2:00 pm, MW Network		at San Jose State	W 82–60	20–9 (9–7)	Provident Credit Union Event Center (677); San Jose, CA
February 26, 2025; 10:00 am, MW Network		at Air Force	W 66–63	21–9 (10–7)	Clune Arena (1,139); Colorado Springs, CO
March 4, 2025; 6:00 pm, MW Network		Fresno State	W 75–61	22–9 (11–7)	Viejas Arena (1,824); San Diego, CA
Mountain West tournament
March 10, 2025; 2:30 pm, MW Network	(4)	vs. (5) New Mexico; Quarterfinals	W 63–53	23–9	Thomas & Mack Center (1,998); Paradise, NV
March 11, 2025; 5:00 pm, MW Network	(4)	vs. (1) UNLV; Semifinals	W 71–59	24–9	Thomas & Mack Center; Paradise, NV
March 12, 2025; 7:30 pm, CBSSN	(4)	vs. (2) Wyoming; Championship	W 72–68 ^{3OT}	25–9	Thomas & Mack Center; Paradise, NV
NCAA tournament
March 22, 2025*; 7:15 p.m., ESPN	(14 S1)	at (3 S1) No. 10 LSU; First round	L 48–103	25–10	Pete Maravich Assembly Center (9,288); Baton Rouge, LA
*Non-conference game. ^{#}Rankings from AP Poll. (#) Tournament seedings in parentheses. S1=Spokane 1. All times are in Pacific.
