= 2024–25 Boise State Broncos women's basketball team =

American college basketball season

2024–25 Boise State Broncos women's basketball
- Conference: Mountain West Conference
- Record: 18–15 (7–11 MW)
- Head coach: Gordy Presnell (20th season)
- Assistant coaches: Heather Sower; Cariann Ramirez; Mike Petrino
- Home arena: ExtraMile Arena

2024–25 Mountain West Conference women's basketball standings
	Conf.				Overall
Team	W		L	PCT	W		L	PCT
UNLV	16	–	2	.889	26	–	8	.765
Wyoming	14	–	4	.778	22	–	12	.647
Colorado State	13	–	5	.722	22	–	10	.688
San Diego State †	11	–	7	.611	25	–	10	.714
New Mexico	11	–	7	.611	18	–	14	.563
Fresno State	8	–	10	.444	19	–	15	.559
Air Force	7	–	11	.389	18	–	15	.545
Boise State	7	–	11	.389	18	–	15	.545
Nevada	6	–	12	.333	11	–	21	.344
Utah State	3	–	15	.167	4	–	27	.129
San Jose State	3	–	15	.167	10	–	22	.313
† 2025 Mountain West tournament winner

The 2024–25 Boise State Broncos women's basketball team represented Boise State University during the 2024–25 NCAA Division I women's basketball season. The Broncos, led by 20th-year head coach Gordy Presnell, played their home games at ExtraMile Arena in Boise, Idaho, as members of the Mountain West Conference.

== Previous season ==
The Broncos finished the 2023–24 season 21–14, 10–8 in Mountain West play to finish in a four-way tie for fourth place. They lost in the semifinals of the Mountain West tournament to San Diego State. They received an at-large bid into the WNIT, where they would be defeated by Montana in the first round.

== Roster ==
2024–25 Boise State Broncos women's basketball team
Players
Coaches

Pos.	#	Name	Height	Year	Previous school	Hometown
G	0	Tatum Thompson	6 ft 1 in (1.85 m)	Jr	Woodinville High School	Woodinville, Washington
G	1	Mya Hansen	5 ft 9 in (1.75 m)	Jr	Billings Central Catholic High School	Billings, Montana
G	2	Linsey Lovrovich	5 ft 9 in (1.75 m)	Sr	Peninsula High School	Gig Harbor, Washington
F	3	Josee Steadman	5 ft 11 in (1.8 m)	RS Jr	Colorado Mesa	Blackfoot, Idaho
G	4	Dani Bayes	5 ft 11 in (1.8 m)	Jr	Sheldon College	Brisbane, Australia
G	5	Allie Hueckman	5 ft 10 in (1.78 m)	RS Jr	Burns High School	Burns, Oregon
G	6	Milly Sharp	5 ft 9 in (1.75 m)	Fr	Ballarat Miners	Ballarat, Australia
F	9	Libby Hutton	6 ft 0 in (1.83 m)	Fr	Perry Lakes Hawks	Perth, Australia
C	10	Madeline Cooke	6 ft 3 in (1.91 m)	Sr	The Master's University	Meridian, Idaho
G	12	Mary Kay Naro	5 ft 11 in (1.8 m)	RS Sr	Beaverton High School	Beaverton, Oregon
F	15	Alyssa Christensen	6 ft 3 in (1.91 m)	Sr	College of Southern Idaho	New Plymouth, Idaho
G	22	Teryn Gardner	5 ft 9 in (1.75 m)	Fr	Mead High School	Spokane, Washington
F	23	Elodie Lalotte	6 ft 1 in (1.85 m)	RS Sr	Orangewood Academy	Paris, France
G	24	Jayda Clark	5 ft 4 in (1.63 m)	Sr	Richland High School	Richland, Washington
G	30	Mackenzie Naro	5 ft 8 in (1.73 m)	Sr	Beaverton High School	Beaverton, Oregon
G	32	Natalie Pasco	5 ft 10 in (1.78 m)	Jr	San Ramon Valley High School	Danville, California
F	33	Abby Muse	6 ft 3 in (1.91 m)	RS Sr	Heritage High School	Brentwood, California

Head coach

- Gordy Presnell (Northwest Nazarene)

Assistant coach(es)

- Heather Sower (Boise State)
- Cariann Ramirez (Boise State)
- Mike Petrino (Montana State Billings)

Legend

- (C) Team captain
- (S) Suspended
- (I) Ineligible
- (W) Walk-on
- Injured
- Current redshirt

Roster
Last update: December 12, 2024

== Schedule and results ==
Date time, TV	Rank^{#}	Opponent^{#}	Result	Record	Site (attendance) city, state
Exhibition
November 2, 2024*; 1:00 pm		Bushnell	W 87–38	–	ExtraMile Arena (–); Boise, ID
Non-conference regular season
November 4, 2024*; 6:30 pm, MW Network		Eastern Oregon	W 87–57	1–0	ExtraMile Arena (1,050); Boise, ID
November 10, 2024*; 2:00 pm, MW Network		Colorado	W 50–47	2–0	ExtraMile Arena (1,537); Boise, ID
November 14, 2024*; 6:30 pm, MW Network		UC Riverside	W 72–57	3–0	ExtraMile Arena (1,090); Boise, ID
November 18, 2024*; 12:00 pm, MW Network		College of Idaho	W 86–34	4–0	ExtraMile Arena (3,488); Boise, ID
November 21, 2024*; 5:00 pm		at San Francisco; USF Legacy Tournament	W 59–57	5–0	Chase Center (453); San Francisco, CA
November 24, 2024*; 2:00 pm, MW Network		Weber State	W 96–46	6–0	ExtraMile Arena (1,366); Boise, ID
November 29, 2024*; 9:00 am, FloHoops		vs. Illinois State; Gulf Coast Showcase quarterfinals	W 79–76	7–0	Hertz Arena (213); Estero, FL
November 30, 2024*; 3:00 pm, FloHoops		vs. No. 12 West Virginia; Gulf Coast Showcase semifinals	L 47–82	7–1	Hertz Arena (314); Estero, FL
December 1, 2024*; 3:00 pm, FloHoops		vs. Butler; Gulf Coast Showcase 3rd place game	L 64–70	7–2	Hertz Arena (274); Estero, FL
December 6, 2024*; 1:00 pm, MW Network		Utah Tech	W 90–56	8–2	ExtraMile Arena (1,189); Boise, ID
December 8, 2024*; 2:00 pm, MW Network		San Diego	W 76–59	9–2	ExtraMile Arena (2,036); Boise, ID
December 18, 2024*; 1:00 pm, B1G+		vs. Furman; Husky Classic	W 74–65	10–2	Hec Edmundson Pavilion; Seattle, WA
December 19, 2024*; 1:00 pm, B1G+		vs. North Dakota State; Husky Classic	L 66–70	10–3	Hec Edmundson Pavilion; Seattle, WA
Mountain West regular season
December 29, 2024; 2:00 pm, MW Network		at San Diego State	L 59–74	10–4 (0–1)	Viejas Arena (2,565); San Diego, CA
January 1, 2025; 6:30 pm, MW Network		Air Force	W 66–55	11–4 (1–1)	ExtraMile Arena (1,649); Boise, ID
January 4, 2025; 6:00 pm, MW Network		UNLV	L 57–61	11–5 (1–2)	ExtraMile Arena (1,946); Boise, ID
January 8, 2025; 6:00 pm, MW Network		at Utah State	W 82–77	12–5 (2–2)	Smith Spectrum (609); Logan, UT
January 11, 2025; 2:00 pm, MW Network		at Fresno State	L 62–68	12–6 (2–3)	Save Mart Center (1,308); Fresno, CA
January 15, 2025; 6:30 pm, MW Network		San Jose Sttae	W 93–64	13–6 (3–3)	ExtraMile Arena (1,251); Boise, ID
January 18, 2025; 2:00 pm, MW Network		Nevada	W 61–53	14–6 (4–3)	ExtraMile Arena (1,937); Boise, ID
January 21, 2025; 6:30 pm, MW Network		at Colorado State	L 70–79	14–7 (4–4)	Moby Arena (1,156); Fort Collins, CO
January 28, 2025*; 6:30 pm, MW Network		New Mexico	W 89–80	15–7 (5–4)	ExtraMile Arena (1,467); Boise, ID
February 1, 2025; 2:00 pm, MW Network		at Wyoming	L 45–79	15–8 (5–5)	Arena-Auditorium (2,716); Laramie, WY
February 5, 2025; 7:30 pm, MW Network		at Nevada	L 61–69	15–9 (5–6)	Lawlor Events Center (1,362); Reno, NV
February 8, 2025; 1:00 pm, MW Network		Colorado State	L 61–67	15–10 (5–7)	ExtraMile Arena (1,730); Boise, ID
February 13, 2025; 7:00 pm, MW Network		at New Mexico	L 83–88	15–11 (5–8)	The Pit (4,705); Albuquerque, NM
February 15, 2025; 1:00 pm, MW Network		Fresno State	L 63–67	15–12 (5–9)	ExtraMile Arena (1,752); Boise, ID
February 18, 2025; 6:30 pm, MW Network		Wyoming	W 78–73	16–12 (6–9)	ExtraMile Arena (1,594); Boise, ID
February 26, 2025; 7:30 pm, MW Network		at UNLV	L 53–83	16–13 (6–10)	Cox Pavilion (1,234); Paradise, NV
March 1, 2025; 1:00 pm, MW Network		at Air Force	L 68–75	16–14 (6–11)	Clune Arena (751); Colorado Springs, CO
March 4, 2025; 6:30 pm, MW Network		Utah State	W 72–59	17–14 (7–11)	ExtraMile Arena (2,180); Boise, ID
Mountain West tournament
March 9, 2025; 3:00 pm, MW Network	(8)	vs. (9) Nevada; First round	W 54–48	18–14	Thomas & Mack Center; Paradise, NV
March 10, 2025; 1:00 pm, MW Network	(8)	vs. (1) UNLV; Quarterfinals	L 70–80	18–15	Thomas & Mack Center; Paradise, NV
*Non-conference game. ^{#}Rankings from AP Poll. (#) Tournament seedings in parentheses. All times are in Mountain.
