= 2024–25 Colorado State Rams women's basketball team =

American college basketball team season

2024–25 Colorado State Rams women's basketball
- Conference: Mountain West Conference
- Record: 22-10 (13-5 MW)
- Head coach: Ryun Williams (13th season)
- Assistant coaches: Rico Burkett (7th season); Buck Scheel (1st season); Kasondra McKay (2nd season); Annie Brady (1st season)
- Home arena: Moby Arena

2024–25 Mountain West Conference women's basketball standings
	Conf.				Overall
Team	W		L	PCT	W		L	PCT
UNLV	16	–	2	.889	26	–	8	.765
Wyoming	14	–	4	.778	22	–	12	.647
Colorado State	13	–	5	.722	22	–	10	.688
San Diego State †	11	–	7	.611	25	–	10	.714
New Mexico	11	–	7	.611	18	–	14	.563
Fresno State	8	–	10	.444	19	–	15	.559
Air Force	7	–	11	.389	18	–	15	.545
Boise State	7	–	11	.389	18	–	15	.545
Nevada	6	–	12	.333	11	–	21	.344
Utah State	3	–	15	.167	4	–	27	.129
San Jose State	3	–	15	.167	10	–	22	.313
† 2025 Mountain West tournament winner

The 2024–25 Colorado State Rams women's basketball team represented Colorado State University in the 2024–25 NCAA Division I women's basketball season. The Rams, led by thirteenth-year head coach Ryun Williams, played their home games at Moby Arena, Fort Collins, Colorado, as members of the Mountain West Conference.

== Previous season ==
During the 2023–24 season, Colorado State went 20–11 (10–8 MW) to finish tied for fourth in the Mountain West standings with Nevada, San Diego State, and Boise State. In the Mountain West tournament, they defeated Nevada in the quarterfinals before ultimately falling 52–62 against UNLV in the semifinals.

== Roster ==
2024–25 Colorado State Rams women's basketball team
Players
Coaches

Pos.	#	Name	Height	Year	Previous school	Hometown
F	0	Kaylee Headrick	5 ft 10 in (1.78 m)	Jr	Riverton High School	Bluffdale, UT
G	1	Kloe Froebe	5 ft 8 in (1.73 m)	Fr	Lincoln Community High School	Lincoln, IL
G	2	Brooke Carlson	5 ft 8 in (1.73 m)	Fr	Batavia High School	Batavia, IL
G	3	Avree Antony	5 ft 10 in (1.78 m)	RS Fr	Sun Prairie High School	Sun Prairie, WI
F	5	Jadyn Fife	6 ft 0 in (1.83 m)	RS So	Liberty Christian School	North Richland Hills, TX
F	10	Joseana Vaz	6 ft 0 in (1.83 m)	RS Sr	Casper College	Praia, Cape Verde
F	12	Ann Zachariah	6 ft 2 in (1.88 m)	RS So	Howard College	Kerala, India
G	14	Marta Leimane	6 ft 0 in (1.83 m)	Jr	Riga 47th Secondary	Ventspils, Latvia
G	20	Sanna Ström	6 ft 0 in (1.83 m)	Sr	Kansas	Luleå, Sweden
F	21	Emma Ronsiek	6 ft 2 in (1.88 m)	GS	Creighton	Sioux Falls, SD
G	23	Caitlin Kramer	6 ft 3 in (1.91 m)	Fr	Air Academy High School	Colorado Springs, CO
F	24	Olivia Pawlicki	6 ft 1 in (1.85 m)	Fr	Shakopee High School	Shakopee, MN
G	30	Hannah Ronsiek	5 ft 11 in (1.8 m)	Jr	O'Gorman Catholic High School	Sioux Falls, SD
G	31	McKenna Murphy	5 ft 11 in (1.8 m)	Fr	Elkhorn North High School	Omaha, NE
G	32	Hannah Simental	5 ft 8 in (1.73 m)	GS	Northern Colorado	Pueblo West, CO

Head coach

- Ryun Williams (South Dakota)

Assistant coach(es)

- Rico Burkett (North Dakota)
- Buck Scheel (Waldorf)
- Kassondra McKay (Louisiana Tech)
- Annie Brady (Colorado State)

Legend

- (C) Team captain
- (S) Suspended
- (I) Ineligible
- (W) Walk-on
- Injured
- Current redshirt

Roster
Last update: January 7, 2025

== Schedule ==
Date time, TV	Rank^{#}	Opponent^{#}	Result	Record	Site (attendance) city, state
Exhibition
October 29, 2024*; 6:30 p.m.		Regis	W 68–57	–	Moby Arena; Fort Collins, CO
Non-conference regular season
November 4, 2024*; 5:30 p.m., MW Network		San Francisco	W 52–47	1–0	Moby Arena (1,182); Fort Collins, CO
November 8, 2024*; 5:30 p.m., MW Network		Oregon State	W 65–59	2–0	Moby Arena (1,108); Fort Collins, CO
November 13, 2024*; 11:00 a.m., ESPN+		at BYU	L 55–69	2–1	Marriott Center (5,154); Provo, UT
November 16, 2024*; 1:00 p.m., MW Network		Columbia (MO)	W 85–28	3–1	Moby Arena (1,288); Fort Collins, CO
November 19, 2024*; 6:30 p.m., MW Network		Southern	W 78–47	4–1	Moby Arena (1,084); Fort Collins, CO
November 23, 2024*; 6:00 p.m., MW Network		Northern Arizona	L 80–84	4–2	Moby Arena (1,354); Fort Collins, CO
November 25, 2024*; 6:30 p.m., MW Network		Black Hills State	W 59–39	5–2	Moby Arena (1,199); Fort Collins, CO
November 29, 2024*; 11:30 a.m.		vs. Kent State; Puerto Rico College Sports Tours Thanksgiving Clásico	W 60–54	6–2	Coliseo Rubén Rodríguez (1); Bayamón, Puerto Rico
November 30, 2024*; 11:30 a.m.		vs. Brown; Puerto Rico College Sports Tours Thanksgiving Clásico	L 63–69	6–3	Coliseo Rubén Rodríguez (100); Bayamón, Puerto Rico
December 8, 2024*; 1:00 p.m., MW Network		Gonzaga	W 74–72 ^{OT}	7–3	Moby Arena (5,500); Fort Collins, CO
December 16, 2024*; 6:30 p.m., MW Network		UTEP	W 70–52	8–3	Moby Arena (1,343); Fort Collins, CO
December 20, 2024*; 2:00 p.m., Baller TV		vs. Georgia; San Diego State Classic	W 72–56	9–3	Viejas Arena; San Diego, CA
December 21, 2024*; 2:00 p.m., Baller TV		vs. Stephen F. Austin; San Diego State Classic	L 69–80	9–4	Viejas Arena; San Diego, CA
Mountain West regular season
December 29, 2024; 2:00 p.m., MW Network		at Utah State	W 83–74	10–4 (1–0)	Smith Spectrum (444); Logan, UT
January 1, 2025; 1:00 p.m., MW Network		San Diego State	W 67–56	11–4 (2–0)	Moby Arena (1,480); Fort Collins, CO
January 4, 2025; 1:00 p.m., MW Network		San Jose State	W 87–51	12–4 (3–0)	Moby Arena (1,538); Fort Collins, CO
January 8, 2025; 7:30 p.m., MW Network		at UNLV	L 61–70	12–5 (3–1)	Cox Pavilion (875); Las Vegas, NV
January 15, 2025; 7:00 p.m., MW Network		at San Diego State	W 62–58	13–5 (4–1)	Viejas Arena (1,353); San Diego, CA
January 18, 2025; 1:00 p.m., MW Network		New Mexico	L 74–78	13–6 (4–2)	Moby Arena (2,338); Fort Collins, CO
January 21, 2025; 6:30 p.m., MW Network		Boise State	W 79–70	14–6 (5–2)	Moby Arena (1,156); Fort Collins, CO
January 25, 2025; 2:00 p.m., MW Network		at Wyoming	W 61–56	15–6 (6–2)	Arena-Auditorium (2,692); Laramie, WY
February 1, 2025; 1:00 p.m., MW Network		Air Force	L 71–75	15–7 (6–3)	Moby Arena (1,868); Fort Collins, CO
February 4, 2025; 8:30 p.m., Fox Sports 1		at New Mexico	W 69–63	16–7 (7–3)	The Pit (4,414); Albuquerque, NM
February 8, 2025; 1:00 p.m., MW Network		at Boise State	W 67–61	17–7 (8–3)	ExtraMile Arena (1,730); Boise, ID
February 12, 2025; 11:00 a.m., MW Network		Utah State	W 72–54	18–7 (9–3)	Moby Arena (6,008); Fort Collins, CO
February 15, 2025; 1:00 p.m., MW Network		at Air Force	W 65–58	19–7 (10–3)	Clune Arena (1,070); Colorado Springs, CO
February 19, 2025; 6:30 p.m., MW Network		Fresno State	W 68–48	20–7 (11–3)	Moby Arena (1,412); Fort Collins, CO
February 22, 2025; 1:00 p.m., MW Network		UNLV	L 65–69	20–8 (11–4)	Moby Arena (2,559); Fort Collins, CO
February 26, 2025; 7:30 p.m., MW Network		at Nevada	W 61–45	21–8 (12–4)	Lawlor Events Center (1,596); Reno, NV
March 1, 2025; 5:00 p.m., MW Network		Wyoming	L 55–68	21–9 (12–5)	Moby Arena (2,612); Fort Collins, CO
March 4, 2024; 7:00 p.m., MW Network		at San Jose State	W 90–70	22–9 (13–5)	Provident Credit Union Event Center (612); San Jose, CA
Mountain West tournament
March 10, 2025; 8:30 p.m., MW Network	(3)	vs. (6) Fresno State; Quarterfinals	L 52–54	22–10	Thomas & Mack Center (1,998); Las Vegas, NV
*Non-conference game. ^{#}Rankings from AP poll. (#) Tournament seedings in parentheses. All times are in Mountain Time.

== See also ==
- 2024–25 Colorado State Rams men's basketball team
