= 2024–25 Air Force Falcons women's basketball team =

American college basketball season

2024–25 Air Force Falcons women's basketball

WNIT, First Round
- Conference: Mountain West Conference
- Record: 18–15 (7–11 MW)
- Head coach: Stacy McIntyre (1st season)
- Associate head coach: Adam Wardenburg
- Assistant coaches: Rynae Rasley; Lauren Brocke; Xojian Harry
- Home arena: Clune Arena

2024–25 Mountain West Conference women's basketball standings
	Conf.				Overall
Team	W		L	PCT	W		L	PCT
UNLV	16	–	2	.889	26	–	8	.765
Wyoming	14	–	4	.778	22	–	12	.647
Colorado State	13	–	5	.722	22	–	10	.688
San Diego State †	11	–	7	.611	25	–	10	.714
New Mexico	11	–	7	.611	18	–	14	.563
Fresno State	8	–	10	.444	19	–	15	.559
Air Force	7	–	11	.389	18	–	15	.545
Boise State	7	–	11	.389	18	–	15	.545
Nevada	6	–	12	.333	11	–	21	.344
Utah State	3	–	15	.167	4	–	27	.129
San Jose State	3	–	15	.167	10	–	22	.313
† 2025 Mountain West tournament winner

The 2024–25 Air Force Falcons women's basketball team represented the United States Air Force Academy during the 2024–25 NCAA Division I women's basketball season. The Falcons, led by first-year head coach Stacy McIntyre, played their home games at Clune Arena in Colorado Springs, Colorado as members of the Mountain West Conference.

== Previous season ==
The Falcons finished the 2023–24 season 15–17, 8–10 in Mountain West play, to finish in eighth place. They were upset by Fresno State in the first round of the Mountain West tournament.

On April 1, 2024, head coach Chris Gobrecht announced her retirement from the program after nine seasons. On April 25, longtime associate head coach Stacy McIntyre was promoted to the head coaching position.

== Roster ==
2024–25 Air Force Falcons women's basketball team
Players
Coaches

Pos.	#	Name	Height	Year	Previous school	Hometown
G	0	Jordyn DeVaughn	5 ft 6 in (1.68 m)	So	Lone Star High School	Little Elm, TX
G	1	Alexis Cortez	5 ft 11 in (1.8 m)	So	Allen High School	Allen, TX
G	2	Milahnie Perry	5 ft 7 in (1.7 m)	Jr	Seffner Christian Academy	Tampa, FL
G	4	Madison Smith	5 ft 8 in (1.73 m)	Sr	Connell High School	Connell, WA
F	5	Sydney Roundtree	6 ft 0 in (1.83 m)	Fr	Bishop Kenny High School	Jacksonville, FL
G	10	Jayda McNabb	5 ft 10 in (1.78 m)	So	USAFA Prep	Rapid City, SD
F	12	Tanah Gorman	6 ft 0 in (1.83 m)	Fr	Bishop Ireton High School	Huntingtown, MD
G	13	Keelie O'Hollaren	5 ft 10 in (1.78 m)	So	Lakeridge High School	Lake Oswego, OR
F	23	Parker Brown	6 ft 0 in (1.83 m)	Jr	Mead High School	Spokane, WA
G	24	Marissa Hargrave	5 ft 8 in (1.73 m)	So	Andress High School	El Paso, TX
G	25	Emma Lytle	5 ft 7 in (1.7 m)	Fr	Valor Christian High School	Denver, CO
F	31	Emily Adams	6 ft 0 in (1.83 m)	Jr	Bishop Fenwick High School	Lebanon, OH
G	40	Jo Huntimer	5 ft 7 in (1.7 m)	Sr	ʻIolani School	Honolulu, HI

Head coach

- Stacy McIntyre (Kentucky)

Assistant coach(es)

- Adam Wardenburg (Utah State)
- Rynae Rasley (CCNY)
- Lauren Brocke (Colorado State)
- Xojian Harry (BYU)

Legend

- (C) Team captain
- (S) Suspended
- (I) Ineligible
- (W) Walk-on
- Injured
- Current redshirt

Roster
Last update: December 11, 2024

== Schedule and results ==
Date time, TV	Rank^{#}	Opponent^{#}	Result	Record	Site (attendance) city, state
Exhibition
October 28, 2024*; 6:30 p.m.		MSU Denver			Clune Arena; Colorado Springs, CO
Non-conference regular season
November 4, 2024*; 4:30 p.m., MW Network		Regis	W 94–64	1–0	Clune Arena (485); Colorado Springs, CO
November 8, 2024*; 4:00 p.m., MW Network		South Dakota	W 73–66	2–0	Clune Arena (252); Colorado Springs, CO
November 11, 2024*; 6:00 p.m., ESPN+		at Northern Colorado	W 73–66	3–0	Bank of Colorado Arena (605); Greeley, CO
November 15, 2024*; 4:00 p.m., ESPN+		at Army	L 51–57	3–1	Christl Arena (948); West Point, NY
November 19, 2024*; 6:30 p.m., MW Network		UCCS	W 71–52	4–1	Clune Arena (588); Colorado Springs, CO
November 22, 2024*; 6:30 p.m., MW Network		UC San Diego	W 67–64	5–1	Clune Arena (691); Colorado Springs, CO
November 28, 2024*; 4:30 p.m.		vs. Milwaukee; Puerto Rico Clasico	W 56–40	6–1	Coliseo Rubén Rodríguez (100); Bayamón, Puerto Rico
November 30, 2024*; 2:30 p.m.		vs. Winthrop; Puerto Rico Clasico	W 62–47	7–1	Coliseo Rubén Rodríguez (100); Bayamón, Puerto Rico
December 4, 2024*; 6:30 p.m., MW Network		Utah Valley	W 76–58	8–1	Clune Arena (798); Colorado Springs, CO
December 7, 2024*; 1:00 p.m., MW Network		Seattle	W 82–44	9–1	Clune Arena (613); Colorado Springs, CO
December 17, 2024*; 7:00 p.m., B1G+		at Oregon	L 36–98	9–2	Matthew Knight Arena (4,551); Eugene, OR
December 20, 2024*; 2:00 p.m., ESPN+		at Portland State	W 69–40	10–2	Viking Pavilion (363); Portland, OR
Mountain West regular season
December 29, 2024; 1:00 p.m., MW Network		New Mexico	L 63–69	10–3 (0–1)	Clune Arena (684); Colorado Springs, CO
January 1, 2025; 6:30 p.m., MW Network		at Boise State	L 55–66	10–4 (0–2)	ExtraMile Arena (1,649); Boise, ID
January 4, 2025; 12:00 p.m., MW Network		Nevada	L 55–58	10–5 (0–3)	Clune Arena (604); Colorado Springs, CO
January 11, 2025; 2:00 p.m., MW Network		at San Jose State	L 84–90	10–6 (0–4)	Provident Credit Union Event Center (314); San Jose, CA
January 15, 2025; 7:00 p.m., MW Network		at UNLV	L 51–84	10–7 (0–5)	Cox Pavilion (957); Paradise, NV
January 18, 2025; 1:00 p.m., MW Network		Fresno State	W 65–36	11–7 (1–5)	Clune Arena (543); Colorado Springs, CO
January 22, 2025; 4:00 p.m., MW Network		Wyoming	L 50–62	11–8 (1–6)	Clune Arena (466); Colorado Springs, CO
January 25, 2025; 2:00 p.m., MW Network		at Nevada	L 59–62	11–9 (1–7)	Lawlor Events Center (1,614); Reno, NV
January 29, 2025; 6:30 p.m., MW Network		Utah State	W 78–66	12–9 (2–7)	Clune Arena (635); Colorado Springs, CO
February 1, 2025; 1:00 p.m., MW Network		at Colorado State	W 75–71	13–9 (3–7)	Moby Arena (1,868); Fort Collins, CO
February 5, 2025; 6:30 p.m., MW Network		San Jose State	W 78–54	14–9 (4–7)	Clune Arena (580); Colorado Springs, CO
February 12, 2025; 6:30 p.m., MW Network		at Wyoming	L 56–64	14–10 (4–8)	Arena-Auditorium (2,163); Laramie, WY
February 15, 2025; 1:00 p.m., MW Network		Colorado State	L 58–65	14–11 (4–9)	Clune Arena (1,070); Colorado Springs, CO
February 19, 2025; 11:00 a.m., MW Network		at Utah State	W 82–77	15–11 (5–9)	Smith Spectrum (1,093); Logan, UT
February 22, 2025; 2:00 p.m., MW Network		at Fresno State	W 67–66	16–11 (6–9)	Save Mart Center (1,129); Fresno, CA
February 26, 2025; 11:00 a.m., MW Network		San Diego State	L 63–66	16–12 (6–10)	Clune Arena (1,139); Colorado Springs, CO
March 1, 2025; 1:00 p.m., Altitude Sports		Boise State	W 75–68	17–12 (7–10)	Clune Arena (751); Colorado Springs, CO
March 4, 2025; 7:00 p.m., MW Network		at New Mexico	L 74–77	17–13 (7–11)	The Pit (5,437); Albuquerque, NM
Mountain West tournament
March 9, 2025; 5:30 p.m., MW Network	(7)	vs. (10) Utah State; First round	W 66-59	18-13	Thomas & Mack Center; Paradise, NV
March 10, 2025; 5:00 p.m., MW Network	(7)	vs. (2) Wyoming; Quarterfinals	L 64-77	18-14	Thomas & Mack Center; Paradise, NV
WNIT
March 21, 2025*; 6:30 p.m., MW Network		Utah Valley; First Round	L 64-70	18-15	Clune Arena; Colorado Springs, CO
*Non-conference game. ^{#}Rankings from AP poll. (#) Tournament seedings in parentheses. All times are in Mountain.
