= 2024–25 San Jose State Spartans women's basketball team =

American college basketball season

2024–25 San Jose State Spartans women's basketball
- Conference: Mountain West Conference
- Record: 10–22 (3–15 MW)
- Head coach: April Phillips (3rd season)
- Associate head coach: Emily Ben-Jumbo
- Assistant coach: Jad Saab
- Home arena: Provident Credit Union Event Center

2024–25 Mountain West Conference women's basketball standings
	Conf.				Overall
Team	W		L	PCT	W		L	PCT
UNLV	16	–	2	.889	26	–	8	.765
Wyoming	14	–	4	.778	22	–	12	.647
Colorado State	13	–	5	.722	22	–	10	.688
San Diego State †	11	–	7	.611	25	–	10	.714
New Mexico	11	–	7	.611	18	–	14	.563
Fresno State	8	–	10	.444	19	–	15	.559
Air Force	7	–	11	.389	18	–	15	.545
Boise State	7	–	11	.389	18	–	15	.545
Nevada	6	–	12	.333	11	–	21	.344
Utah State	3	–	15	.167	4	–	27	.129
San Jose State	3	–	15	.167	10	–	22	.313
† 2025 Mountain West tournament winner

The 2024–25 San Jose State Spartans women's basketball team represented San Jose State University during the 2024–25 NCAA Division I women's basketball season. The Spartans, who were led by third-year head coach April Phillips, played their home games at Provident Credit Union Event Center in San Jose, California, as members of the Mountain West Conference. After the season’s conclusion on March 24, 2025 Phillips was dismissed from San Jose State. She amassed a record of 23-71 (.245) over her three seasons of coaching.

== Previous season ==
The Spartans finished the 2023–24 season 7–24, 2–16 in Mountain West play, to finish in a tie for last place. They were defeated by San Diego State in the first round of the Mountain West tournament.

== Preseason ==
On October 16, 2024, the Mountain West Conference released their preseason coaches poll. San Jose State was picked to finish tenth in the Mountain West regular season.

=== Preseason rankings ===
Mountain West preseason poll
Predicted finish	Team	Votes (1st place)
1	UNLV	298 (21)
2	Wyoming	251 (3)
3	Colorado State	248 (4)
4	Boise State	221
5	San Diego State	218 (2)
6	New Mexico	172
7	Nevada	125
8	Air Force	116
9	Fresno State	109
10	San Jose State	60
11	Utah State	41

=== Preseason All-Mountain West Team ===
No Spartans were named to the Preseason All-Mountain West team.

== Roster ==
2024–25 San Jose State Spartans women's basketball team
Players
Coaches

Pos.	#	Name	Height	Year	Previous school	Hometown
G	0	Sydni Summers	5 ft 5 in (1.65 m)	So	Centennial High School	Inglewood, California
G	1	Amiah Simmons	5 ft 9 in (1.75 m)	Sr	Alabama A&M	Overland Park, Kansas
G	2	Jasmine Singleton	5 ft 7 in (1.7 m)	RS Jr	Eastern Arizona College	Goodyear, Arizona
F	3	Nailea Nicholas	6 ft 1 in (1.85 m)	RS Sr	Northeastern Junior College	Fresno, California
F/C	5	Hennie Van Schaik	6 ft 4 in (1.93 m)	Sr	Louisville	Urk, Netherlands
G	7	Mecca Alexander	5 ft 7 in (1.7 m)	Fr	Cornerstone Christian School	Antioch, California
G	8	Amira Brown	5 ft 10 in (1.78 m)	RS Jr	Tulsa	Richmond, California
G	9	Rylei Waugh	5 ft 6 in (1.68 m)	So	Pima Community College	Los Angeles, California
F	11	Marisa Davis-Jones	6 ft 1 in (1.85 m)	Sr	Washington	Surprise, Arizona
G/F	12	Sofia Kelemeni	6 ft 0 in (1.83 m)	Jr	International School of Greece	Kavala, Greece
G/F	15	Maya Anderson	6 ft 1 in (1.85 m)	So	Crestwood Preparatory College	Toronto, Ontario
G	22	Kaliyah Dillard	6 ft 0 in (1.83 m)	RS Fr	Centennial High School	Las Vegas, Nevada
G	23	Stella Sgro	5 ft 11 in (1.8 m)	Fr	Royal Crown School	Toronto, Ontario
F/C	31	Finau Tonga	6 ft 2 in (1.88 m)	RS Sr	Salt Lake Community College	Taylorsville, Utah
F	32	Djessira Diawara	6 ft 3 in (1.91 m)	Sr	Houston	Bamako, Mali

Head coach

- April Phillips (Xavier)

Assistant coach(es)

- Emily Ben-Jumbo (Loyola Marymount)
- Jad Saab (Belgrade)

Legend

- (C) Team captain
- (S) Suspended
- (I) Ineligible
- (W) Walk-on
- Injured
- Current redshirt

Roster
Last update: March 24, 2025

== Schedule and results ==
Date time, TV	Rank^{#}	Opponent^{#}	Result	Record	High points	High rebounds	High assists	Site (attendance) city, state
Exhibition
October 30, 2024*; 6:00 pm		Lincoln	W 81–37	–	22 – Simmons	10 – Simmons	3 – Tied	Provident Credit Union Event Center (857); San Jose, CA
Non-conference regular season
November 4, 2024*; 2:00 pm, FloHoops		at Xavier	W 55–36	1–0	11 – Tied	6 – Singleton	4 – Summers	Cintas Center (347); Cincinnati, OH
November 9, 2024*; 1:00 pm, MWN		California	L 53–82	1–1	12 – Tonga	7 – Tied	3 – Summers	Provident Credit Union Event Center (1,228); San Jose, CA
November 12, 2024*; 6:00 pm, MWN		San Francisco State	W 92–65	2–1	22 – Tonga	9 – Tonga	6 – Brown	Provident Credit Union Event Center (914); San Jose, CA
November 17, 2024*; 2:00 pm, ESPN+		at UC Santa Barbara	L 76–86	2–2	17 – Summers	6 – Brown	3 – Waugh	The Thunderdome (501); Santa Barbara, CA
November 21, 2024*; 5:00 pm, MWN		Kennesaw State	W 68–64	3–2	13 – Summers	7 – Diawara	5 – Waugh	Provident Credit Union Event Center (321); San Jose, CA
November 24, 2024*; 2:00 pm, MWN		Cal State Northridge	W 62–44	4–2	15 – Van Schaik	14 – Diawara	4 – Van Schaik	Provident Credit Union Event Center (514); San Jose, CA
November 28, 2024*; 1:00 pm		vs. UNC Wilmington; Puerto Rico Clásico	L 61–65 ^{OT}	4–3	15 – Diawara	14 – Diawara	5 – Tied	Coliseo Rubén Rodríguez (100); Bayamón, PR
November 30, 2024*; 1:00 pm		vs. UMass Lowell; Puerto Rico Clásico	W 68–67	5–3	20 – Kelemeni	8 – Van Schaik	3 – Tied	Coliseo Rubén Rodríguez (100); Bayamón, PR
December 4, 2024*; 6:00 pm, MWN		Saint Mary's	W 51–46	6–3	14 – Diawara	11 – Kelemeni	3 – Brown	Provident Credit Union Event Center (148); San Jose, CA
December 7, 2024*; 1:00 pm, MWN		Loyola Marymount	L 71–82	6–4	17 – Summers	8 – Van Schaik	5 – Singleton	Provident Credit Union Event Center (288); San Jose, CA
December 10, 2024*; 6:00 pm, MWN		Tulsa	L 48–77	6–5	9 – Tied	7 – Diawara	2 – Diawara	Provident Credit Union Event Center (235); San Jose, CA
December 15, 2024*; 2:00 pm, ESPN+		at Sacramento State	L 39–66	6–6	11 – Summers	7 – Summers	2 – Tied	Hornets Nest (327); Sacramento, CA
December 21, 2024*; 5:00 pm, MWN		Bethesda	W 100–44	7–6	27 – Kelemeni	12 – Tonga	6 – Brown	Provident Credit Union Event Center (412); San Jose, CA
Mountain West regular season
December 29, 2024; 1:00 pm, MWN		at Nevada	L 59–63	7–7 (0–1)	15 – Kelemeni	9 – Diawara	3 – Waugh	Lawlor Events Center (1,367); Reno, NV
January 1, 2025; 1:00 pm, MWN		UNLV	L 70–90	7–8 (0–2)	15 – Brown	10 – Diawara	4 – Summers	Provident Credit Union Event Center (356); San Jose, CA
January 4, 2025; 12:00 pm, MWN		at Colorado State	L 51–87	7–9 (0–3)	12 – Summers	8 – Davis-Jones	4 – Summers	Moby Arena (1,538); Fort Collins, CO
January 8, 2025; 6:00 pm, MWN		Fresno State	L 64–77	7–10 (0–4)	16 – Simmons	8 – Brown	4 – Tied	Provident Credit Union Event Center (245); San Jose, CA
January 11, 2025; 1:00 pm, MWN		Air Force	W 90–84	8–10 (1–4)	26 – Simmons	10 – Diawara	8 – Brown	Provident Credit Union Event Center (314); San Jose, CA
January 15, 2025; 5:30 pm, MWN		at Boise State	L 64–93	8–11 (1–5)	17 – Summers	11 – Brown	4 – Simmons	ExtraMile Arena (1,251); Boise, ID
January 22, 2025; 6:00 pm, MWN		at San Diego State	W 68–57	9–11 (2–5)	23 – Simmons	6 – Tied	5 – Summers	Viejas Arena (1,191); San Diego, CA
January 25, 2025; 1:00 pm, NBCSBA/MWN		Utah State	L 64–70	9–12 (2–6)	23 – Simmons	8 – Tonga	4 – Summers	Provident Credit Union Event Center (1,439); San Jose, CA
January 29, 2025; 6:00 pm, MWN		Wyoming	L 64–77	9–13 (2–7)	26 – Simmons	5 – Tonga	4 – Summers	Provident Credit Union Event Center (286); San Jose, CA
February 1, 2025; 2:00 pm, MWN		at Fresno State	L 85–99	9–14 (2–8)	32 – Simmons	8 – Tonga	3 – Brown	Save Mart Center (1,884); Fresno, CA
February 5, 2025; 5:30 pm, MWN		at Air Force	L 54–78	9–15 (2–9)	18 – Simmons	14 – Tonga	4 – Summers	Clune Arena (580); Colorado Springs, CO
February 8, 2025; 1:30 pm, MWN/NBCSBA		Nevada	W 72–67	10–15 (3–9)	21 – Summers	6 – Tied	3 – Tied	Provident Credit Union Event Center (537); San Jose, CA
February 15, 2025; 1:00 pm, MWN		at Wyoming	L 54–59	10–16 (3–10)	20 – Simmons	11 – Brown	2 – Brown	Arena-Auditorium (2,454); Laramie, WY
February 19, 2025; 6:00 pm, MWN		New Mexico	L 65–72	10–17 (3–11)	14 – Tonga	11 – Diawara	3 – Waugh	Provident Credit Union Event Center (356); San Jose, CA
February 22, 2025; 2:00 pm, MWN		San Diego State	L 60–82	10–18 (3–12)	22 – Simmons	8 – Van Schaik	3 – Summers	Provident Credit Union Event Center (677); San Jose, CA
February 26, 2025; 4:00 pm, MWN		at Utah State	L 75–82	10–19 (3–13)	29 – Simmons	9 – Brown	4 – Tied	Smith Spectrum (427); Logan, UT
March 1, 2025; 2:00 pm, MWN		at UNLV	L 56–89	10–20 (3–14)	24 – Simmons	8 – Diawara	4 – Simmons	Cox Pavilion (2,141); Paradise, NV
March 4, 2025; 7:00 pm, NBCSCA/MWN		Colorado State	L 70–90	10–22 (3–15)	21 – Simmons	5 – Tied	4 – Singleton	Provident Credit Union Event Center (612); San Jose, CA
Mountain West tournament
March 9, 2025; 7:00 pm, MWN	(11)	vs. (6) Fresno State; First Round	L 62–67	10–22	16 – Simmons	9 – Simmons	4 – Simmons	Thomas & Mack Center (6,632); Paradise, NV
*Non-conference game. ^{#}Rankings from AP poll. (#) Tournament seedings in parentheses. All times are in Pacific.
