= April Phillips (basketball) =

American basketball player and coach

Current position
- Title: Associate head coach
- Team: Purdue

Playing career
- 2005–2006: Georgia Tech
- 2006–2010: Xavier

Coaching career (HC unless noted)
- 2013–2014: New Haven (assistant)
- 2014–2015: Georgia Tech (graduate assistant)
- 2015–2016: Loyola Marymount (assistant
- 2016–2018: Loyola Marymount (associate HC)
- 2018–2019: Arizona (assistant)
- 2019–2021: California (assistant)
- 2021–2022: Texas (assistant)
- 2022–2025: San Jose State
- 2025–present: Purdue (associate HC)

Head coaching record
- Overall: 23–71 (.245)

April Denise Phillips (born June 14, 1987) is an American basketball coach and former player who is the associate head coach of the Purdue Boilermakers women’s basketball team. Phillips is also the former head coach at San Jose State University in California.

== Early life and playing career ==
A native of Long Beach, California and graduate of Long Beach Polytechnic High School, Phillips attended Georgia Tech where she was played on the women's basketball team for one year, before transferring to Xavier in 2006.

== Coaching career ==
On April 6, 2022, Phillips was hired as head coach at San Jose State University. On March 24, 2025 Phillips was dismissed from San Jose State. She amassed a record of 23–71 over her three seasons of coaching.

On April 29, 2025, Phillips was hired by Purdue University, as the associate head coach of their women's basketball team.

== Head coaching record ==
Statistics overview
Season	Team	Overall	Conference	Standing	Postseason
San Jose State Spartans (Mountain West) (2022–2025)
2022–23	San Jose State	6–25	3–15	T-9th	
2023–24	San Jose State	7–24	2–16	T-10th	
2024–25	San Jose State	10–22	3–15	T-10th	
San Jose State:		23–71 (.245)	8–46 (.148)		
Total:		23–71 (.245)			
National champion Postseason invitational champion Conference regular season champion Conference regular season and conference tournament champion Division regular season champion Division regular season and conference tournament champion Conference tournament champion
