= 2024–25 Nevada Wolf Pack women's basketball team =

American college basketball season

2024–25 Nevada Wolf Pack women's basketball
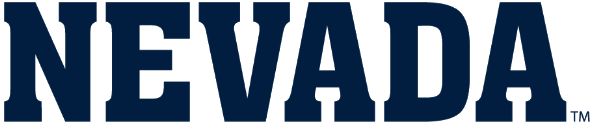
- Conference: Mountain West Conference
- Record: 11–21 (6–12 MW)
- Head coach: Amanda Levens (8th season)
- Assistant coaches: Laura Gonsalves; Ashley Elliott; Halie Bergman; Ula Motuga; Lavaris Duncan
- Home arena: Lawlor Events Center

2024–25 Mountain West Conference women's basketball standings
	Conf.				Overall
Team	W		L	PCT	W		L	PCT
UNLV	16	–	2	.889	26	–	8	.765
Wyoming	14	–	4	.778	22	–	12	.647
Colorado State	13	–	5	.722	22	–	10	.688
San Diego State †	11	–	7	.611	25	–	10	.714
New Mexico	11	–	7	.611	18	–	14	.563
Fresno State	8	–	10	.444	19	–	15	.559
Air Force	7	–	11	.389	18	–	15	.545
Boise State	7	–	11	.389	18	–	15	.545
Nevada	6	–	12	.333	11	–	21	.344
Utah State	3	–	15	.167	4	–	27	.129
San Jose State	3	–	15	.167	10	–	22	.313
† 2025 Mountain West tournament winner

The 2024–25 Nevada Wolf Pack women's basketball team represented the University of Nevada, Reno during the 2024–25 NCAA Division I women's basketball season. The Wolf Pack, who were led by eighth-year head coach Amanda Levens, played their home games at the Lawlor Events Center in Reno, Nevada, as members of the Mountain West Conference.

== Previous season ==
The Wolf Pack finished the 2023–24 season 16–16, 10–8 in Mountain West play, to finish in a four-way tie for fourth place. They were defeated by Colorado State in the quarterfinals of the Mountain West tournament.

== Preseason ==
On October 16, 2024, the Mountain West Conference released their preseason coaches poll. Nevada was picked to finish seventh in the Mountain West regular season.

=== Preseason rankings ===
Mountain West preseason poll
Predicted finish	Team	Votes (1st place)
1	UNLV	298 (21)
2	Wyoming	251 (3)
3	Colorado State	248 (4)
4	Boise State	221
5	San Diego State	218 (2)
6	New Mexico	172
7	Nevada	125
8	Air Force	116
9	Fresno State	109
10	San Jose State	60
11	Utah State	41

=== Preseason All-Mountain West Team ===
No Wolf Pack were named to the Preseason All-Mountain West team.

== Roster ==
2024–25 Nevada Wolf Pack women's basketball team
Players
Coaches

Pos.	#	Name	Height	Year	Previous school	Hometown
G	1	Ahrray Young	5 ft 11 in (1.8 m)	Jr	Tulsa	Sacramento, California
G	2	Izzy Sullivan	5 ft 10 in (1.78 m)	So	Eastside Catholic School	Sammamish, Washington
F	3	Imbie Jones	6 ft 2 in (1.88 m)	So	Wisconsin	Seattle, Washington
G	4	Audrey Roden	5 ft 9 in (1.75 m)	Sr	West Linn High School	West Linn, Oregon
G	5	Kaylee Borden	5 ft 6 in (1.68 m)	Sr	Anadarko High School	Anadarko, Oklahoma
F	8	Olivia Poulivaati	6 ft 0 in (1.83 m)	RS Fr	Tualatin High School	Tualatin, Oregon
G	10	Dymonique Maxie	5 ft 8 in (1.73 m)	So	Moreau Catholic High School	Hayward, California
PG	11	Victoria Davis (5Y)	5 ft 4 in (1.63 m)	Sr	Hampton	Chicago, Illinois
F	13	Amelia Raidaveta	6 ft 2 in (1.88 m)	Jr	Weber State	Dubbo, Australia
G	20	Rakiyah Jackson	5 ft 10 in (1.78 m)	So	Garfield High School	Seattle, Washington
G	21	Charlotte Climenhage	6 ft 0 in (1.83 m)	RS Fr	Folsom High School	Folsom, California
F	23	Lexie Givens (5Y)	6 ft 0 in (1.83 m)	Sr	Alameda High School	Alameda, California
F	24	Kennedy Lee	6 ft 0 in (1.83 m)	Jr	Centennial High School	Louisville, Kentucky
F	33	Hannah Hartley	5 ft 11 in (1.8 m)	RS Jr	Galena High School	Reno, Nevada
F	34	Kendra Hicks	6 ft 1 in (1.85 m)	Fr	Jesuit High School	Portland, Oregon
G	35	Elle Motherway	5 ft 11 in (1.8 m)	So	Bishop Manogue High School	Reno, Nevada

Head coach

- Amanda Levens (Arizona State)

Assistant coach(es)

- Laura Gonsalves (Washington)
- Ashley Elliott (Wyoming)
- Halie Bergman (Nevada)
- Ula Motuga (Washington State)
- Lavaris Duncan (Angelo State)

Legend

- (C) Team captain
- (S) Suspended
- (I) Ineligible
- (W) Walk-on
- (5Y) Fifth-year senior
- Injured
- Current redshirt

Roster
Last update: March 24, 2025

== Schedule and results ==
Date time, TV	Rank^{#}	Opponent^{#}	Result	Record	High points	High rebounds	High assists	Site (attendance) city, state
Exhibition
October 30, 2024*; 6:30 pm		Stanislaus State	W 73–45	–	–	–	–	Lawlor Events Center; Reno, NV
Non-conference regular season
November 6, 2024*; 7:00 pm, B1G+		at Oregon	L 58–76	0–1	11 – Davis	7 – Raidaveta	4 – Sullivan	Matthew Knight Arena (4,253); Eugene, OR
November 8, 2024*; 6:30 pm, MWN		Bushnell	W 70–48	1–1	17 – Lee	6 – Lee	5 – Maxie	Lawlor Events Center (1,412); Reno, NV
November 12, 2024*; 7:00 pm, MWN		vs. Colorado	L 59–75	1–2	17 – Givens	8 – Givens	2 – Tied	Tahoe Blue Event Center (533); Stateline, NV
November 14, 2024*; 7:00 pm, ESPN+		at UC Santa Barbara	W 80–73 ^{OT}	2–2	24 – Sullivan	9 – Roden	4 – Roden	The Thunderdome (492); Santa Barbara, CA
November 22, 2024*; 6:30 pm, MWN		Weber State	L 62–66	2–3	11 – Tied	12 – Givens	4 – Poulivaati	Lawlor Events Center (1,519); Reno, NV
November 24, 2024*; 1:00 pm, NSN/MWN		Morgan State	W 66–56	3–3	24 – Davis	8 – Givens	3 – Maxie	Lawlor Events Center (1,308); Reno, NV
November 29, 2024*; 1:00 pm, NSN/MWN		Central Michigan; Nugget Classic	L 57–60	3–4	15 – Sullivan	10 – Lee	2 – Tied	Lawlor Events Center; Reno, NV
November 30, 2024*; 1:00 pm, NSN/MWN		Southern Utah; Nugget Classic	W 72–54	4–4	18 – Sullivan	9 – Lee	3 – Tied	Lawlor Events Center; Reno, NV
December 1, 2024*; 1:00 pm, NSN/MWN		Portland; Nugget Classic	L 72–88	4–5	14 – Davis	8 – Givens	5 – Davis	Lawlor Events Center; Reno, NV
December 6, 2024*; 6:00 pm, ESPN+		at Pepperdine	L 58–60	4–6	20 – Givens	13 – Poulivaati	5 – Davis	Firestone Fieldhouse (227); Malibu, CA
December 14, 2024*; 1:30 pm, MWN		Cal State East Bay	W 95–54	5–6	23 – Davis	6 – Maxie	6 – Roden	Lawlor Events Center (1,454); Reno, NV
December 19, 2024*; 9:30 pm		vs. Miami (FL); Maui Classic	L 53–84	5–7	18 – Givens	5 – Hicks	2 – Maxie	Seabury Hall (1,007); Makawao, HI
December 20, 2024*; 5:30 pm		vs. Western Kentucky; Maui Classic	L 70–80	5–8	15 – Givens	12 – Givens	2 – Davis	Seabury Hall; Makawao, HI
Mountain West regular season
December 29, 2024; 1:00 pm, MWN		San Jose State	W 63–59	6–8 (1–0)	13 – Sullivan	6 – Roden	3 – Maxie	Lawlor Events Center; Reno, NV
January 1, 2025; 1:00 pm, MWN/RYZ Sports		at New Mexico	L 62–70	6–9 (1–1)	15 – Jones	11 – Givens	4 – Givens	The Pit (5,216); Albuquerque, NM
January 4, 2025; 11:00 am, MWN		at Air Force	W 58–55	7–9 (2–1)	15 – Tied	10 – Givens	5 – Davis	Clune Arena (604); Colorado Springs, CO
January 8, 2025; 6:30 pm, NSN/MWN		San Diego State	L 62–81	7–10 (2–2)	17 – Givens	7 – Jones	6 – Maxie	Lawlor Events Center (1,228); Reno, NV
January 11, 2025; 1:00 pm, NSN/MWN		Utah State	W 78–69	8–10 (3–2)	16 – Givens	10 – Givens	3 – Tied	Lawlor Events Center (1,474); Reno, NV
January 15, 2025; 5:30 pm, MWN		at Wyoming	L 61–66	8–11 (3–3)	13 – Tied	6 – Roden	5 – Roden	Arena-Auditorium (1,958); Laramie, WY
January 18, 2025; 1:00 pm, MWN		at Boise State	L 53–61	8–12 (3–4)	17 – Givens	6 – Tied	3 – Roden	ExtraMile Arena (1,937); Boise, ID
January 25, 2025; 1:00 pm, NSN/MWN		Air Force	W 62–59	9–12 (4–4)	16 – Maxie	7 – Tied	3 – Tied	Lawlor Events Center (1,614); Reno, NV
January 29, 2025; 11:00 am, NSN/MWN		Fresno State	L 59–65	9–13 (4–5)	16 – Jones	8 – Givens	5 – Maxie	Lawlor Events Center (10,689); Reno, NV
February 1, 2025; 2:00 pm, MWN		at UNLV	L 59–68	9–14 (4–6)	13 – Tied	9 – Givens	3 – Givens	Cox Pavilion (1,961); Paradise, NV
February 5, 2025; 6:30 pm, NSN/MWN		Boise State	W 69–61	10–14 (5–6)	20 – Givens	12 – Roden	6 – Roden	Lawlor Events Center (1,362); Reno, NV
February 8, 2025; 1:30 pm, MWN/NBCSBA		at San Jose State	L 67–72	10–15 (5–7)	21 – Givens	7 – Givens	5 – Roden	Provident Credit Union Event Center (537); San Jose, CA
February 12, 2025; 6:00 pm, MWN		at Fresno State	W 67–55	11–15 (6–7)	15 – Roden	7 – Givens	4 – Sullivan	Save Mart Center (1,213); Fresno, CA
February 15, 2025; 1:00 pm, NSN/MWN		UNLV	L 50–64	11–16 (6–8)	12 – Givens	5 – Maxie	3 – Tied	Lawlor Events Center; Reno, NV
February 19, 2025; 11:00 am, MWN		at San Diego State	L 43–72	11–17 (6–9)	17 – Givens	8 – Jackson	1 – Tied	Viejas Arena (4,088); San Diego, CA
February 22, 2025; 6:30 pm, NSN/MWN		Wyoming	L 42–45	11–18 (6–10)	12 – Givens	11 – Givens	2 – Tied	Lawlor Events Center (1,608); Reno, NV
February 26, 2025; 6:30 pm, NSN/MWN		Colorado State	L 45–61	11–19 (6–11)	13 – Maxie	7 – Givens	3 – Tied	Lawlor Events Center (1,596); Reno, NV
March 1, 2025; 1:00 pm, MWN		at Utah State	L 75–93	11–20 (6–12)	19 – Maxie	12 – Givens	6 – Roden	Smith Spectrum (521); Logan, UT
Mountain West tournament
March 9, 2025; 2:00 pm, MWN	(9)	vs. (8) Boise State; First Round	L 48–54	11–21	13 – Givens	10 – Givens	3 – Jones	Thomas & Mack Center; Paradise, NV
*Non-conference game. ^{#}Rankings from AP poll. (#) Tournament seedings in parentheses. All times are in Pacific.
