= Wesley Brooks =

American college basketball coach

Current position
- Title: Head coach
- Team: Utah State
- Conference: Pac-12
- Record: 10–51 (.164)

Biographical details
- Education: West Virginia

Coaching career (HC unless noted)
- 2004–2006: West Virginia (GA)
- 2007–2008: Robert Morris (asst.)
- 2008–2011: Texas Southern (asst.)
- 2011–2015: North Texas (asst.)
- 2015–2017: Utah (asst.)
- 2017–2021: Michigan (asst.)
- 2021–2024: Ohio State (asst.)
- 2024–present: Utah State

Administrative career (AD unless noted)
- 2006–2007: West Virginia (Director of Basketball Operations)

Head coaching record
- Overall: 10–51 (.164)

Wesley Brooks is an American basketball coach who is the current head coach of the Utah State Aggies women's basketball team.

== Early life ==
A native of Richmond, Virginia, Brooks attended West Virginia University where he graduated with a bachelor's degree in 2004 and master's degree in 2006. While an undergraduate student at WVU, he served as the manager for the West Virginia Mountaineers men's basketball team.

== Coaching career ==
On April 1, 2024, Brooks was named as the 11th head coach at Utah State.

== Head coaching record ==
Record table
Season	Team	Overall	Conference	Standing	Postseason
Utah State Aggies (Mountain West) (2024–2026)
2024–25	Utah State	4–27	3–15	T-10th	
2025–26	Utah State	6–24	2–18	T-11th	
Weber State:		10–51 (.164)	5–33 (.132)		
Total:		10–51 (.164)			
National champion Postseason invitational champion Conference regular season champion Conference regular season and conference tournament champion Division regular season champion Division regular season and conference tournament champion Conference tournament champion
