= 2024–25 Utah State Aggies women's basketball team =

American college basketball season

2024–25 Utah State Aggies women's basketball
- Conference: Mountain West Conference
- Record: 4-27 (3-15 MW)
- Head coach: Wesley Brooks (1st season)
- Associate head coach: Velaida Harris (1st season)
- Assistant coaches: Joe Haigh (1st season); Alexis Hyder (1st season); CJ Vaifanua-Pace (2nd season)
- Home arena: Smith Spectrum

2024–25 Mountain West Conference women's basketball standings
	Conf.				Overall
Team	W		L	PCT	W		L	PCT
UNLV	16	–	2	.889	26	–	8	.765
Wyoming	14	–	4	.778	22	–	12	.647
Colorado State	13	–	5	.722	22	–	10	.688
San Diego State †	11	–	7	.611	25	–	10	.714
New Mexico	11	–	7	.611	18	–	14	.563
Fresno State	8	–	10	.444	19	–	15	.559
Air Force	7	–	11	.389	18	–	15	.545
Boise State	7	–	11	.389	18	–	15	.545
Nevada	6	–	12	.333	11	–	21	.344
Utah State	3	–	15	.167	4	–	27	.129
San Jose State	3	–	15	.167	10	–	22	.313
† 2025 Mountain West tournament winner

The 2024–25 Utah State Aggies women's basketball team represent Utah State University in the 2024–25 NCAA Division I women's basketball season. The Aggies, who were led by first-year head coach Wesley Brooks, played their home games at the Smith Spectrum in Logan, Utah, as members of the Mountain West Conference.

== Previous season ==
The Aggies finished the 2023–24 season 5–25, 2–16 in Mountain West Play to finish in a tie for tenth (last) place. They were defeated by Boise State in the first round of the Mountain West tournament. Following the loss, the school announced that head coach Kayla Ard would be relieved of her duties.

On April 1, 2024, former Ohio State assistant coach, Wesley Brooks, was hired as the 11th head coach in program history.

== Roster ==
2024–25 Utah State Aggies women's basketball team
Players
Coaches

Pos.	#	Name	Height	Year	Previous school	Hometown
G	0	Ivory Finley	5 ft 10 in (1.78 m)	Sr	UMass Lowell	Minneapolis, MN
G/F	1	Samiana Suguturaga	5 ft 11 in (1.8 m)	Sr	Snow College	Orem, UT
G	2	Isabella Tañedo	5 ft 4 in (1.63 m)	Jr	St. John's College High School	Laurel, MD
G	3	Ava Smith	5 ft 8 in (1.73 m)	Fr	Union High School	Camas, WA
G	4	Denae Skelton	5 ft 8 in (1.73 m)	Fr	Champlain College Saint-Lambert	West Kelowna, Canada
G	5	Riley Ward	5 ft 7 in (1.7 m)	Fr	Preston High School	Preston, ID
G	10	Carlie Latta	5 ft 10 in (1.78 m)	Fr	Minico High School	Paul, ID
G/F	11	Karlie Banks	5 ft 11 in (1.8 m)	Fr	Sandpoint High School	Laclede, ID
G	12	Elise Livingston	5 ft 9 in (1.75 m)	Fr	Ridgeline High School	Millville, UT
F	15	Gracie Johnson	6 ft 6 in (1.98 m)	So	Nyssa High School	Nyssa, OR
G/F	22	Taliyah Logwood	5 ft 9 in (1.75 m)	Fr	Oakland Technical High School	Richmond, CA
G	23	Mia Tarver	5 ft 7 in (1.7 m)	Jr	Salt Lake Community College	Salt Lake City, UT
G	24	Cheyenne Stubbs	5 ft 5 in (1.65 m)	Sr	Canisius	Bradenton, FL
F	31	Allyzee Verdan	6 ft 2 in (1.88 m)	Sr	Salt Lake Community College	Cayenne, French Guiana
G	32	Jamisyn Heaton	5 ft 10 in (1.78 m)	Jr	College of Southern Idaho	Lehi, UT
F/C	55	Sophie Sene	6 ft 3 in (1.91 m)	Jr	Rhode Island	Nice, France

Head coach

- Wesley Brooks (West Virginia)

Assistant coach(es)

- Velaida Harris (Portland State)
- Joe Haigh (Notre Dame)
- Alexis Hyder (LSU)
- CJ Vaifanua-Pace (South Carolina)

Legend

- (C) Team captain
- (S) Suspended
- (I) Ineligible
- (W) Walk-on
- Injured
- Current redshirt

Roster
Last update: January 5, 2025

== Schedule and results ==
Date time, TV	Rank^{#}	Opponent^{#}	Result	Record	Site (attendance) city, state
Exhibition
October 25, 2024*; 6:00 p.m.		Westminster	W 94–70	–	Smith Spectrum (362); Logan, UT
Non-conference regular season
November 4, 2024*; 6:00 p.m.		Kansas City	L 77–80	0–1	Smith Spectrum (502); Logan, UT
November 8, 2024*; 6:00 p.m.		Cal State Northridge	L 65–69	0–2	Smith Spectrum (670); Logan, UT
November 14, 2024*; 11:00 a.m.		Cal State Bakersfield	W 67–51	1–2	Smith Spectrum (3,450); Logan, UT
November 17, 2024*; 2:00 p.m.		at Northern Colorado	L 57–85	1–3	Bank of Colorado Arena (581); Greeley, CO
November 19, 2024*; 7:00 p.m., ESPN+		at Colorado	L 65–95	1–4	CU Events Center (2,573); Boulder, CO
November 26, 2024*; 6:00 p.m.		at Omaha	L 77–79 ^{OT}	1–5	Baxter Arena (440); Omaha, NE
November 29, 2024*; 1:30 p.m., Baller TV		vs. No. 11 Ohio State; Daytona Beach Classic	L 51–87	1–6	Ocean Center (135); Daytona, FL
November 30, 2024*; 9:00 a.m., Baller TV		vs. Stetson; Daytona Beach Classic	L 76–84	1–7	Ocean Center (75); Daytona, FL
December 4, 2024*; 7:00 p.m., ESPN+		at Utah	L 34–87	1–8	Delta Center (3,949); Salt Lake City, UT
December 8, 2024*; 1:00 p.m.		at Grand Canyon	L 62–76	1–9	Global Credit Union Arena (511); Phoenix, AZ
December 15, 2024*; 2:00 p.m., ESPN+		at Idaho	L 56–71	1–10	Idaho Central Credit Union Arena; Moscow, ID
December 18, 2024*; 6:00 p.m.		UC Riverside	L 59–74	1–11	Smith Spectrum (394); Logan, UT
Mountain West regular season
December 29, 2024; 2:00 p.m., MW Network		Colorado State	L 74–83	1–12 (0–1)	Smith Spectrum (444); Logan, UT
January 1, 2025; 2:00 p.m., MW Network		at Wyoming	L 53–73	1–13 (0–2)	Arena-Auditorium (2,463); Laramie, WY
January 8, 2025; 6:00 p.m., MW Network		Boise State	L 77–82	1–14 (0–3)	Smith Spectrum (609); Logan, UT
January 11, 2025; 2:00 p.m, MW Network		at Nevada	L 69–78	1–15 (0–4)	Lawlor Events Center (1,474); Reno, NV
January 15, 2025; 7:00 p.m, MW Network		at Fresno State	L 54–74	1–16 (0–5)	Save Mart Center (937); Fresno, CA
January 18, 2025; 2:00 p.m, MW Network		San Diego State	L 66–85	1–17 (0–6)	Smith Spectrum (519); Logan, UT
January 21, 2025; 6:00 p.m, MW Network		New Mexico	L 79–101	1–18 (0–7)	Smith Spectrum (491); Logan, UT
January 25, 2025; 2:00 p.m, MW Network		at San Jose State	W 70–64	2–18 (1–7)	Provident Credit Union Event Center (1,439); San Jose, CA
January 29, 2025; 6:30 p.m, MW Network		at Air Force	L 66–78	2–19 (1–8)	Clune Arena (635); Colorado Springs, CO
February 5, 2025; 6:00 p.m, MW Network		UNLV	L 51–89	2–20 (1–9)	Smith Spectrum (544); Logan, UT
February 8, 2025; 2:00 p.m, MW Network		Fresno State	L 73–81 ^{OT}	2–21 (1–10)	Smith Spectrum (533); Logan, UT
February 12, 2025; 11:00 a.m., MW Network		at Colorado State	L 54–72	2–22 (1–11)	Moby Arena (6,008); Fort Collins, CO
February 15, 2025; 2:00 p.m, MW Network		at San Diego State	L 63–78	2–23 (1–12)	Viejas Arena (1,456); San Diego, CA
February 19, 2025; 11:00 a.m., MW Network		Air Force	L 77–82	2–24 (1–13)	Smith Spectrum (1,093); Logan, UT
February 22, 2025; 2:00 p.m, MW Network		at New Mexico	L 65–73	2–25 (1–14)	The Pit; Albuquerque, NM
February 26, 2025; 5:00 p.m, MW Network		San Jose State	W 82–75	3–25 (2–14)	Smith Spectrum (427); Logan, UT
March 1, 2025; 2:00 p.m, MW Network		Nevada	W 93–75	4–25 (3–14)	Smith Spectrum (521); Logan, UT
March 4, 2025; 6:30 p.m., MW Network		at Boise State	L 59–72	4–26 (3–15)	ExtraMile Arena (2,180); Boise, ID
Mountain West tournament
March 9, 2025; 5:30 p.m., MW Network	(10)	vs. (7) Air Force; Quarterfinals	L 59–66	4–27	Thomas & Mack Center; Las Vegas, NV
*Non-conference game. ^{#}Rankings from AP poll. (#) Tournament seedings in parentheses. All times are in Mountain.

== See also ==
- 2024–25 Utah State Aggies men's basketball team
