= 2024–25 Fresno State Bulldogs women's basketball team =

American college basketball season

2024–25 Fresno State Bulldogs women's basketball
- Conference: Mountain West Conference
- Record: 19–15 (8–10 MW)
- Head coach: Jaime White (11th season)
- Associate head coach: Mandi Carver
- Assistant coaches: Courtnay Pilypaitis; Alan Nakamura
- Home arena: Save Mart Center

2024–25 Mountain West Conference women's basketball standings
	Conf.				Overall
Team	W		L	PCT	W		L	PCT
UNLV	16	–	2	.889	26	–	8	.765
Wyoming	14	–	4	.778	22	–	12	.647
Colorado State	13	–	5	.722	22	–	10	.688
San Diego State †	11	–	7	.611	25	–	10	.714
New Mexico	11	–	7	.611	18	–	14	.563
Fresno State	8	–	10	.444	19	–	15	.559
Air Force	7	–	11	.389	18	–	15	.545
Boise State	7	–	11	.389	18	–	15	.545
Nevada	6	–	12	.333	11	–	21	.344
Utah State	3	–	15	.167	4	–	27	.129
San Jose State	3	–	15	.167	10	–	22	.313
† 2025 Mountain West tournament winner

The 2024–25 Fresno State Bulldogs women's basketball team represented California State University, Fresno during the 2024–25 NCAA Division I women's basketball season. The Bulldogs, who were led by 11th-year head coach Jaime White, played their home games at the Save Mart Center in Fresno, California, as members of the Mountain West Conference.

== Previous season ==
The Bulldogs finished the 2023–24 season 15–18, 7–11 in Mountain West play, to finish in ninth place. They defeated Air Force, before falling to top-seeded and eventual tournament champions UNLV in the quarterfinals of the Mountain West tournament.

== Preseason ==
On October 16, 2024, the Mountain West Conference released their preseason coaches poll. Fresno State was picked to finish ninth in the Mountain West regular season.

=== Preseason rankings ===
Mountain West preseason poll
Predicted finish	Team	Votes (1st place)
1	UNLV	298 (21)
2	Wyoming	251 (3)
3	Colorado State	248 (4)
4	Boise State	221
5	San Diego State	218 (2)
6	New Mexico	172
7	Nevada	125
8	Air Force	116
9	Fresno State	109
10	San Jose State	60
11	Utah State	41

=== Preseason All-Mountain West Team ===
Preseason All-Mountain West Team
Player	Position	Year
Mia Jacobs	Forward	Junior

== Roster ==
2024–25 Fresno State Bulldogs women's basketball team
Players
Coaches

Pos.	#	Name	Height	Year	Previous school	Hometown
F	0	Elif Dila Bayrak	6 ft 1 in (1.85 m)	Jr	Çankaya	Ankara, Turkey
G	1	Taija Sta. Maria	5 ft 6 in (1.68 m)	So	Crestwood Preparatory College	Vaughan, Ontario
G	2	Mariah Elohim	5 ft 10 in (1.78 m)	Jr	LIU	Westlake Village, California
G	3	Danae Powell	5 ft 7 in (1.7 m)	Fr	Centennial High School	Las Vegas, Nevada
G	5	Aloni Oliver	5 ft 9 in (1.75 m)	Fr	Buchanan High School	Clovis, California
G	7	Saga Ukkonen	5 ft 9 in (1.75 m)	Sr	Texas Tech	Helsinki, Finland
F	8	Holly Griffiths	6 ft 4 in (1.93 m)	So	Pepperdine	Melbourne, Australia
G	10	Alannah Chatfield	5 ft 8 in (1.73 m)	RS So	Dandenong Rangers	Melbourne, Australia
G	11	Malaya LeSueur	5 ft 9 in (1.75 m)	So	Benson Polytechnic High School	Portland, Oregon
F	12	Avery Watkins	6 ft 1 in (1.85 m)	RS So	Hawaii	Seattle, Washington
F	13	Maria Konstantinidou	6 ft 2 in (1.88 m)	So	Otto-Hahn-Gymnasium	Stuttgart, Germany
F	15	Laney Amundsen	6 ft 1 in (1.85 m)	Sr	Cal State Northridge	Fresno, California
F	20	Rayna Williams	6 ft 0 in (1.83 m)	Fr	Legion Preparatory Academy	The Colony, Texas
F	23	Mia Jacobs	6 ft 2 in (1.88 m)	Jr	La Salle	Perth, Australia
F	30	Kylee Fox	5 ft 11 in (1.8 m)	So	Richland High School	Richland, Washington

Head coach

- Jaime White (Southern Utah)

Assistant coach(es)

- Mandi Carver (Idaho State)
- Courtnay Pilypaitis (Vermont)
- Alan Nakamura (San Diego State)

Legend

- (C) Team captain
- (S) Suspended
- (I) Ineligible
- (W) Walk-on
- Injured
- Current redshirt

Roster
Last update: March 23, 2025

== Postseason honors and awards ==
All-Mountain West Team
Player	Position	Year
Mia Jacobs	Forward	Junior

== Schedule and results ==
Date time, TV	Rank^{#}	Opponent^{#}	Result	Record	High points	High rebounds	High assists	Site (attendance) city, state
Exhibition
October 25, 2024*; 6:00 pm		Cal State Monterey Bay	W 72–50	–	–	–	–	Save Mart Center; Fresno, CA
Non-conference regular season
November 4, 2024*; 6:00 pm, MWN		Fresno Pacific	W 72–46	1–0	18 – Jacobs	10 – Jacobs	3 – Fox	Save Mart Center (1,115); Fresno, CA
November 9, 2024*; 2:00 pm, MWN		Santa Clara	L 61–67	1–1	25 – Jacobs	10 – Jacobs	4 – Sta. Maria	Save Mart Center (997); Fresno, CA
November 11, 2024*; 6:00 pm, MWN		UC Riverside	W 63–53	2–1	21 – Jacobs	15 – Jacobs	5 – Sta. Maria	Save Mart Center; Fresno, CA
November 13, 2024*; 6:00 pm, MWN		Southern Utah	W 67–59	3–1	26 – Jacobs	6 – Sta. Maria	4 – Sta. Maria	Save Mart Center (887); Fresno, CA
November 17, 2024*; 2:00 pm, ESPN+		at UC San Diego	W 65–53	4–1	21 – Fox	9 – Jacobs	7 – Jacobs	LionTree Arena (1,002); La Jolla, CA
November 22, 2024*; 6:00 pm, MWN		Cal State Northridge	W 90–73	5–1	23 – Elohim	12 – Jacobs	4 – Tied	Save Mart Center (907); Fresno, CA
November 29, 2024*; 5:30 pm, ESPN+		at Hawai'i; Rainbow Wahine Showdown	L 47–50	5–2	14 – Jacobs	18 – Jacobs	2 – Jacobs	Stan Sheriff Center (1,658); Honolulu, HI
November 30, 2024*; 3:00 pm		vs. No. 1 UCLA; Rainbow Wahine Showdown	L 41–97	5–3	11 – Jacobs	5 – Jacobs	2 – Fox	Stan Sheriff Center; Honolulu, HI
December 1, 2024*; 3:00 pm		vs. UT Martin; Rainbow Wahine Showdown	W 75–66	6–3	31 – Jacobs	14 – Jacobs	4 – Tied	Stan Sheriff Center; Honolulu, HI
December 5, 2024*; 6:00 pm, MWN		UC Merced	W 83–60	7–3	18 – Jacobs	11 – Jacobs	5 – Powell	Save Mart Center (930); Fresno, CA
December 10, 2024*; 6:00 pm, BTN		at No. 5 USC	L 40–89	7–4	11 – Tied	4 – Tied	3 – Tied	Galen Center (3,081); Los Angeles, CA
December 14, 2024*; 1:00 pm, MWN		Cal State Bakersfield	W 65–46	8–4	17 – Jacobs	10 – Jacobs	4 – Elohim	Save Mart Center (964); Fresno, CA
December 19, 2024*; 6:00 pm, MWN		Northern Arizona	W 66–55	9–4	21 – Jacobs	14 – Jacobs	3 – Elohim	Save Mart Center; Fresno, CA
Mountain West regular season
December 29, 2024; 2:00 pm, MWN		at UNLV	L 53–78	9–5 (0–1)	15 – Elohim	5 – Fox	4 – Jacobs	Cox Pavilion (1,008); Paradise, NV
January 4, 2025; 2:00 pm, MWN		Wyoming	L 59–68	9–6 (0–2)	18 – Elohim	6 – Tied	4 – Fox	Save Mart Center (1,196); Fresno, CA
January 8, 2025; 6:00 pm, MWN		at San Jose State	W 77–64	10–6 (1–2)	32 – Jacobs	10 – Jacobs	4 – Ukkonen	Provident Credit Union Event Center (245); San Jose, CA
January 11, 2025; 1:00 pm, MWN		Boise State	W 68–62	11–6 (2–2)	30 – Jacobs	10 – Jacobs	6 – Fox	Save Mart Center (1,308); Fresno, CA
January 15, 2025; 6:00 pm, MWN		Utah State	W 74–54	12–6 (3–2)	26 – Jacobs	7 – Jacobs	4 – Tied	Save Mart Center (937); Fresno, CA
January 18, 2025; 12:00 pm, MWN		at Air Force	L 36–65	12–7 (3–3)	14 – Fox	8 – Jacobs	2 – Powell	Clune Arena (543); Colorado Springs, CO
January 22, 2025; 6:00 pm, MWN		UNLV	L 48–73	12–8 (3–4)	13 – Jacobs	8 – Konstantinidou	2 – Ukkonen	Save Mart Center (1,029); Fresno, CA
January 25, 2025; 1:00 pm, MWN		at New Mexico	W 77–64	13–8 (4–4)	20 – Jacobs	10 – Jacobs	7 – Powell	The Pit (5,127); Albuquerque, NM
January 29, 2025; 11:00 am, MWN		at Nevada	W 65–59	14–8 (5–4)	23 – Jacobs	15 – Jacobs	4 – Ukkonen	Lawlor Events Center (10,689); Reno, NV
February 1, 2025; 2:00 pm, MWN		San Jose State	W 99–85	15–8 (6–4)	36 – Jacobs	11 – Jacobs	7 – Elohim	Save Mart Center (1,884); Fresno, CA
February 5, 2025; 6:00 pm, MWN		San Diego State	L 57–61	15–9 (6–5)	15 – Tied	12 – Jacobs	3 – Tied	Save Mart Center (961); Fresno, CA
February 8, 2025; 1:00 pm, MWN		at Utah State	W 81–73 ^{OT}	16–9 (7–5)	22 – Powell	15 – Jacobs	4 – Sta. Maria	Smith Spectrum (533); Logan, UT
February 12, 2025; 6:00 pm, MWN		Nevada	L 55–67	16–10 (7–6)	19 – Jacobs	8 – Jacobs	3 – Jacobs	Save Mart Center (1,213); Fresno, CA
February 15, 2025; 12:00 pm, MWN		at Boise State	W 67–63	17–10 (8–6)	19 – Jacobs	9 – Jacobs	4 – Ukkonen	ExtraMile Arena (1,752); Boise, ID
February 19, 2025; 5:30 pm, MWN		at Colorado State	L 48–68	17–11 (8–7)	12 – Fox	12 – Jacobs	3 – Sta. Maria	Moby Arena (1,412); Fort Collins, CO
February 22, 2025; 2:00 pm, MWN		Air Force	L 66–67	17–12 (8–8)	18 – Jacobs	9 – Jacobs	6 – Sta. Maria	Save Mart Center (1,129); Fresno, CA
March 1, 2025; 1:00 pm, MWN		New Mexico	L 61–65	17–13 (8–9)	21 – Jacobs	11 – Jacobs	5 – Ukkonen	Save Mart Center (1,365); Fresno, CA
March 4, 2025; 6:00 pm, MWN		at San Diego State	L 61–75	17–14 (8–10)	17 – Tied	5 – Tied	4 – Elohim	Viejas Arena (1,824); San Diego, CA
Mountain West tournament
March 9, 2025; 7:00 pm, MWN	(6)	vs. (11) San Jose State; First Round	W 67–62	18–14	15 – Elohim	10 – Jacobs	4 – Sta. Maria	Thomas & Mack Center (6,632); Paradise, NV
March 10, 2025; 7:00 pm, MWN	(6)	vs. (3) Colorado State; Quarterfinals	W 54–52	19–14	20 – Jacobs	18 – Jacobs	4 – Sta. Maria	Thomas & Mack Center (1,998); Paradise, NV
March 11, 2025; 7:30 pm, MWN	(6)	vs. (2) Wyoming; Semifinals	L 45–57	19–15	20 – Jacobs	8 – Jacobs	3 – Tied	Thomas & Mack Center (2,052); Paradise, NV
*Non-conference game. ^{#}Rankings from AP poll. (#) Tournament seedings in parentheses. All times are in Pacific.
