= Stacie Terry-Hutson =

American basketball player and coach (born 1976)

Stacie Terry
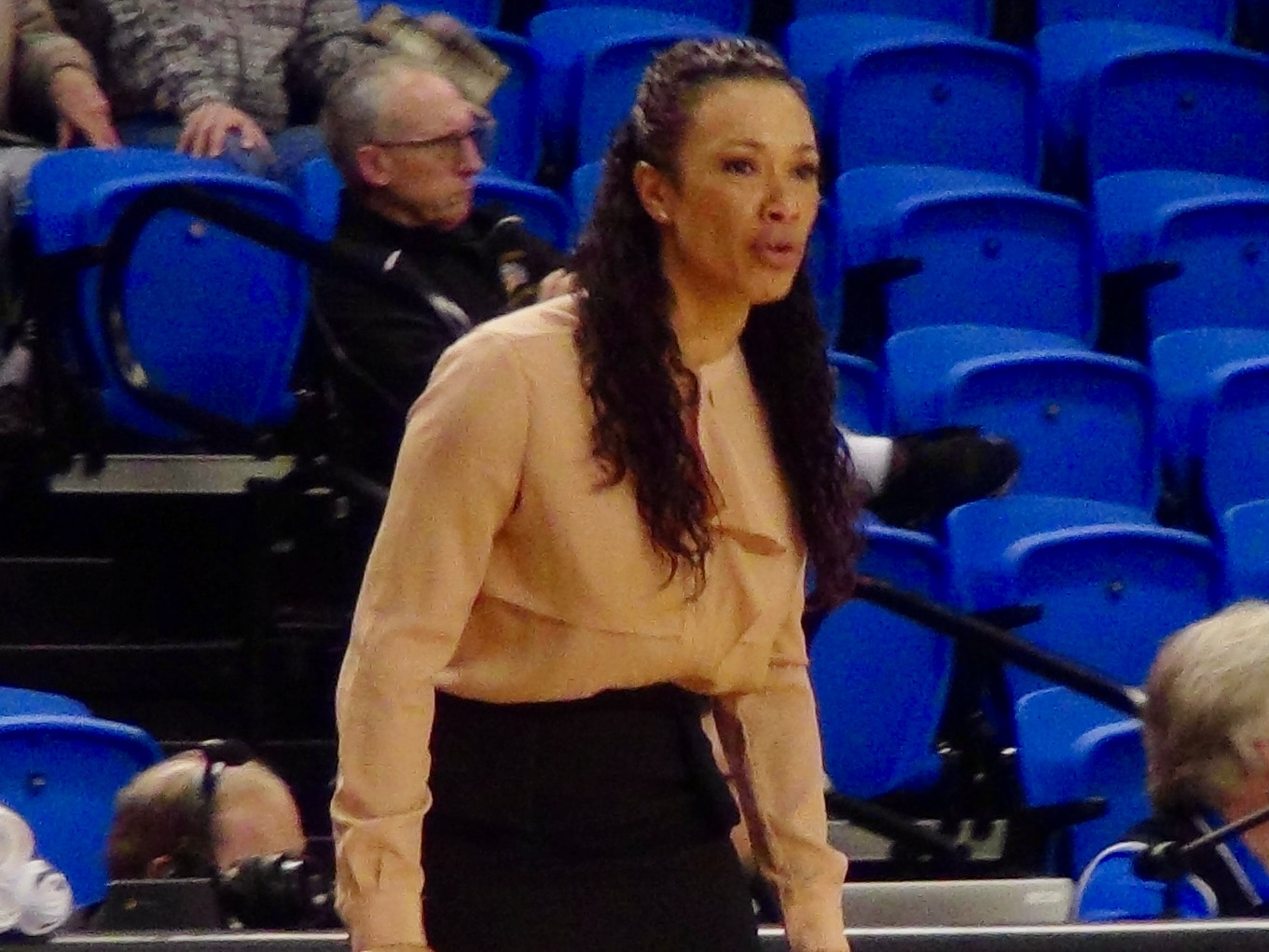
- Terry in 2017.

Current position
- Title: Head coach
- Team: San Diego State
- Conference: Pac-12
- Record: 206–201 (.506)

Biographical details
- Born: October 8, 1976 (age 50); San Diego, California, U.S.

Playing career
- 1994–1998: Texas–Arlington
- 1998: Polonia Warsaw
- Position: Point guard / shooting guard

Coaching career (HC unless noted)
- 1999–2000: Texas–Arlington (graduate assistant)
- 2000–2003: Louisville (assistant)
- 2003–2004: Dayton (assistant)
- 2004–2007: Illinois (assistant)
- 2007–2008: Southern Miss (assistant)
- 2008–2011: UCLA (assistant)
- 2011–2013: LSU (assistant)
- 2013–present: San Diego State

Head coaching record
- Overall: 206–201 (.506)

Accomplishments and honors

Championships
- Mountain West tournament (2025); Mountain West regular season (2026)

Awards
- Mountain West Coach of the Year (2026)

Stacie Lynne Terry-Hutson (born October 8, 1976) is an American college basketball coach and former player who is the head coach of the San Diego State Aztecs women's basketball team at San Diego State University (SDSU).

== Early life, education, and pro basketball career ==
Born Stacie Lynne Terry in San Diego, Terry-Hutson graduated from El Capitan High School in nearby Lakeside in 1994. At the University of Texas at Arlington, Terry-Hutson was a four-year guard for the Texas–Arlington Mavericks from 1994 to 1998. As a junior in 1996–97, Terry started all 28 games and averaged 10.3 points and 5.6 rebounds. In her senior season of 1997–98, Terry-Hutson was the team's leading scorer with 17.4 points and averaged 4.4 rebounds.

In 1998–99, Terry-Hutson played one season of pro basketball for the Polish team Polonia Warsaw, averaging 12.0 points and 6.0 rebounds.

== Coaching career ==
=== Assistant coach (1999–2013) ===
In 1999, Terry-Hutson returned to UT Arlington women's basketball to be a graduate assistant. Then from 2000 to 2003, Terry-Hutson was an assistant coach at Louisville under head coach Martin Clapp. Clapp resigned from Louisville after the 2002–03 season. Terry subsequently became assistant coach at Dayton for the 2003–04 season under Jim Jabir.

On September 17, 2004, Terry-Hutson became an assistant coach at Illinois under Theresa Grentz. After Grentz retired following the 2006–07 season, Terry-Hutson moved to Southern Miss on July 23, 2007, as an assistant coach under Joye Lee-McNelis. The 2007–08 Southern Miss team finished the season 21–14 with a third round appearance in the 2008 Women's National Invitation Tournament.

Terry-Hutson was an assistant coach at UCLA from 2008 to 2011 and LSU from 2011 to 2013.

=== San Diego State (2013–present) ===
Terry-Hutson was hired as head coach at San Diego State on May 15, 2013. In her first season, Terry led San Diego State to a 13–17 (9–9 Mountain West Conference) record for a sixth place tie in conference standings.

In 2019–20, San Diego State finished 14–17 (9–9 MW) with a tie for fifth in MW standings, the best finish under Terry-Hutson. Following that season, Terry-Hutson signed a contract extension on April 2, 2020, through the 2023–24 season. However, outside the 2019–20 season, San Diego State did not finish better than sixth place in the Mountain West, and San Diego State did not have a winning record through the 2021-22 season. Following a 15–16 (8–10 MW) season in 2021–22, Terry had a cumulative 109–161 record at San Diego State..

Since 2022-23, Terry-Hutson's teams have had winning seasons (2022-23: 23-11, 12-6 MW; 2023-24: 22-13, 10-8 MW; 2024-25: 25-10, 10-7 MW). In March 2025, the Aztecs won the Mountain West Tournament by defeating #5 New Mexico, #1 UNLV, and #2 Wyoming in a triple overtime final. As of Jan 27, 2026, the 2025-26 team is 15-3 overall and undefeated, 9-0, in Mountain West Conference play. https://goaztecs.com/sports/womens-basketball/schedule/season/2025-26

== Head coaching record ==
- San Diego State
- Mountain West

Record table
Season	Team	Overall	Conference	Standing	Postseason
San Diego State Aztecs (Mountain West Conference) (2013–2026)
2013–14	San Diego State	13–17	9–9	T–6th	
2014–15	San Diego State	12–19	8–10	7th	
2015–16	San Diego State	12–19	6–12	T–8th	
2016–17	San Diego State	11–19	6–12	9th	
2017–18	San Diego State	11–19	5–13	T–8th	
2018–19	San Diego State	14–18	7–11	T–7th	
2019–20	San Diego State	14–17	9–9	T–5th	
2020–21	San Diego State	7–17	5–12	8th	
2021–22	San Diego State	15–16	8–10	7th	
2022–23	San Diego State	23–11	12–6	T–3rd	WNIT first round
2023–24	San Diego State	22–13	10–8	T–4th	
2024–25	San Diego State	25–10	11–7	T–4th	NCAA First Round
2025–26	San Diego State	27–6	19–1	1st	WBIT Quarterfinals
San Diego State:		206–201 (.506)	115–120 (.489)		
Total:		206–201 (.506)			
National champion Postseason invitational champion Conference regular season champion Conference regular season and conference tournament champion Division regular season champion Division regular season and conference tournament champion Conference tournament champion

== Personal life ==
In 2019, Terry married Justin Hutson, former head men's basketball coach at Fresno State. They met when Justin was a men's basketball assistant coach at San Diego State.
