= 2024–25 New Mexico Lobos women's basketball team =

American college basketball season

2024–25 New Mexico Lobos women's basketball
- Conference: Mountain West Conference
- Record: 18–14 (11–7 MW)
- Head coach: Mike Bradbury (9th season)
- Associate head coach: Keith Freeman
- Assistant coaches: Nike McClure; Mackenzie Novak
- Home arena: The Pit

2024–25 Mountain West Conference women's basketball standings
| | Conf. | | | | Overall |
| Team | W | | L | PCT | W | | L | PCT |
|---|---|---|---|---|---|---|---|---|
| UNLV | 16 | – | 2 | .889 | 26 | – | 8 | .765 |
| Wyoming | 14 | – | 4 | .778 | 22 | – | 12 | .647 |
| Colorado State | 13 | – | 5 | .722 | 22 | – | 10 | .688 |
| San Diego State † | 11 | – | 7 | .611 | 25 | – | 10 | .714 |
| New Mexico | 11 | – | 7 | .611 | 18 | – | 14 | .563 |
| Fresno State | 8 | – | 10 | .444 | 19 | – | 15 | .559 |
| Air Force | 7 | – | 11 | .389 | 18 | – | 15 | .545 |
| Boise State | 7 | – | 11 | .389 | 18 | – | 15 | .545 |
| Nevada | 6 | – | 12 | .333 | 11 | – | 21 | .344 |
| Utah State | 3 | – | 15 | .167 | 4 | – | 27 | .129 |
| San Jose State | 3 | – | 15 | .167 | 10 | – | 22 | .313 |
† 2025 Mountain West tournament winner

The 2024–25 New Mexico Lobos women's basketball team represent the University of New Mexico during the 2024–25 NCAA Division I women's basketball season. The Lobos were led by ninth-year head coach Mike Bradbury, played their home games at The Pit in Albuquerque, New Mexico, as members of the Mountain West Conference.

== Previous season ==
The Lobos finished the 2023–24 season 21–11, 12–6 in Mountain West play to finish in second place. They were defeated by San Diego State in the quarterfinals of the Mountain West tournament.

== Roster ==
2024–25 New Mexico Lobos women's basketball team
Players
Coaches

| Pos. | # | Name | Height | Year | Previous school | Hometown |
|---|---|---|---|---|---|---|
| G | 1 | Lydie Mwamba | 5 ft 9 in (1.75 m) | Jr | Trinity Valley Community College | Kinshasa, Democratic Republic of Congo |
| G | 3 | Destinee Hooks | 5 ft 9 in (1.75 m) | So | Vincennes | Indianapolis, Indiana |
| G | 4 | Alyssa Hargrove | 5 ft 8 in (1.73 m) | Sr | Austin Peay | Dayton, Ohio |
| G | 5 | Lara Langermann | 5 ft 7 in (1.7 m) | So | Theodor-Heuss-Gymnasium Hagen | Breckerfeld, Germany |
| F | 10 | Paris Lauro | 6 ft 0 in (1.83 m) | So | Highland Park High School | Dallas, Texas |
| G | 11 | Nayli Padilla | 5 ft 9 in (1.75 m) | Fr | IES Tarahales | Santa Cruz de Tenerife, Spain |
| G | 13 | Joana Magalhaes | 5 ft 5 in (1.65 m) | Fr | Quinta Do Marques | Lisbon, Portugal |
| F | 14 | Hulda Joaquim | 6 ft 1 in (1.85 m) | GS | Seward County Community College | Maputo, Mozambique |
| G | 15 | Drew Jordon | 5 ft 11 in (1.8 m) | So | Wagner | Washington, D.C. |
| G | 21 | Reza Po | 5 ft 2 in (1.57 m) | Fr | Sacred Heart Cathedral Preparatory | San Bruno, California |
| F | 24 | Amhyia Moreland | 6 ft 1 in (1.85 m) | Sr | San Jose State | Charlotte, North Carolina |
| G | 33 | Vianè Cumber | 5 ft 11 in (1.8 m) | Sr | Sandia High School | Albuquerque, New Mexico |
| F/C | 40 | Clarissa Craig | 6 ft 3 in (1.91 m) | Sr | Cincinnati | Cincinnati, Ohio |
| G | 45 | Lilli Hakkarainen | 5 ft 7 in (1.7 m) | Fr | Mäkelänrinne Upper Secondary School | Kotka, Finland |

Head coach

- Mike Bradbury (Chattanooga)

Assistant coach(es)

- Keith Freeman (Huntington)
- Nike McClure (New Mexico)
- Mackenzie Novak (Bethel)

Legend

- (C) Team captain
- (S) Suspended
- (I) Ineligible
- (W) Walk-on
- Injured
- Current redshirt

Roster
Last update: February 12, 2025

== Schedule and results ==
| Date time, TV | Rank^{#} | Opponent^{#} | Result | Record | Site (attendance) city, state |
Exhibition
| October 20, 2024*; 2:00 pm | | New Mexico Highlands | W 93–67 | – | The Pit (–); Albuquerque, NM |
| October 26, 2024*; 2:00 pm | | Western Colorado | W 78–54 | – | The Pit (–); Albuquerque, NM |
Non-conference regular season
| November 4, 2024*; 11:00 am, MW Network | | Northern Arizona | L 78–80 | 0–1 | The Pit (5,114); Albuquerque, NM |
| November 7, 2024*; 7:00 pm, MW Network | | Morehead State | W 66–56 | 1–1 | The Pit (4,372); Albuquerque, NM |
| November 12, 2025*; 5:00 pm, ESPN+ | | at Texas Tech | L 68–75 | 1–2 | United Supermarkets Arena (3,690); Lubbock, TX |
| November 15, 2024*; 7:00 pm, MW Network | | Western New Mexico | W 85–56 | 2–2 | The Pit (4,521); Albuquerque, NM |
| November 20, 2024*; 7:00 pm, MW Network | | South Carolina State | W 80–38 | 3–2 | The Pit (4,423); Albuquerque, NM |
| November 24, 2024*; 1:00 pm, MW Network | | Gonzaga | L 68–81 | 3–3 | The Pit (4,943); Albuquerque, NM |
| November 27, 2024*; 7:00 pm, MW Network | | UC Irvine | W 65–62 | 4–3 | The Pit (4,669); Albuquerque, NM |
| December 1, 2024*; 1:00 pm, MW Network | | North Texas | W 75–58 | 5–3 | The Pit (4,489); Albuquerque, NM |
| December 6, 2024*; 7:00 pm, MW Network | | New Mexico State; Rio Grande Rivalry | L 71–81 | 5–4 | The Pit (4,880); Albuquerque, NM |
| December 8, 2024*; 2:00 pm, ESPN+ | | at New Mexico State; Rio Grande Rivalry | L 60–68 | 5–5 | Pan American Center (547); Las Cruces, NM |
| December 15, 2024*; 2:00 pm, MW Network | | Pepperdine | W 82–59 | 6–5 | The Pit (4,575); Albuquerque, NM |
| December 19, 2024*; 7:00 pm, MW Network | | Sacramento State; Lobo Invitational | W 69–57 | 7–5 | The Pit (4,260); Albuquerque, NM |
| December 21, 2024*; 1:00 pm, MW Network | | Abilene Christian; Lobo Invitational | L 69–77 | 7–6 | The Pit (4,672); Albuquerque, NM |
Mountain West regular season
| December 29, 2024; 1:00 pm, MW Network | | at Air Force | W 69–63 | 8–6 (1–0) | Clune Arena (684); Colorado Springs, CO |
| January 1, 2025; 2:00 pm, MW Network | | Nevada | W 70–62 | 9–6 (2–0) | The Pit (5,216); Albuquerque, NM |
| January 4, 2025; 2:00 pm, MW Network | | at San Diego State | W 68–59 | 10–6 (3–0) | Viejas Arena (1,529); San Diego, CA |
| January 8, 2025; 7:00 pm, MW Network | | Wyoming | W 73–67 | 11–6 (4–0) | The Pit (4,470); Albuquerque, NM |
| January 12, 2025; 2:00 pm, CBSSN | | UNLV | L 73–88 | 11–7 (4–1) | The Pit (5,767); Albuquerque, NM |
| January 18, 2025; 1:00 pm, MW Network | | at Colorado State | W 78–74 | 12–7 (5–1) | Moby Arena (2,338); Fort Collins, CO |
| January 21, 2025; 6:00 pm, MW Network | | at Utah State | W 101–79 | 13–7 (6–1) | Smith Spectrum (491); Logan, UT |
| January 25, 2025; 2:00 pm, MW Network | | Fresno State | L 64–77 | 13–8 (6–2) | The Pit (5,127); Albuquerque, NM |
| January 28, 2025; 6:30 pm, MW Network | | at Boise State | L 80–89 | 13–9 (6–3) | ExtraMile Arena (1,467); Boise, ID |
| February 1, 2025; 2:00 pm, MW Network | | San Diego State | L 46–59 | 13–10 (6–4) | The Pit (5,186); Albuquerque, NM |
| February 4, 2025; 8:30 pm, FS1 | | Colorado State | L 63–69 | 13–11 (6–5) | The Pit (4,414); Albuquerque, NM |
| February 8, 2025; 3:00 pm, MW Network | | at UNLV | L 65–90 | 13–12 (6–6) | Cox Pavilion (1,376); Paradise, NV |
| February 13, 2025; 7:00 pm, MW Network | | Boise State | W 88–83 | 14–12 (7–6) | The Pit (4,705); Albuquerque, NM |
| February 19, 2025; 7:00 pm, MW Network | | at San Jose State | W 72–65 | 15–12 (8–6) | Provident Credit Union Event Center (356); San Jose, CA |
| February 22, 2025; 2:00 pm, MW Network | | Utah State | W 73–65 | 16–12 (9–6) | The Pit (5,620); Albuquerque, NM |
| February 26, 2025; 6:30 pm, MW Network | | at Wyoming | L 40–59 | 16–13 (9–7) | Arena-Auditorium (2,191); Laramie, WY |
| March 1, 2025; 2:00 pm, MW Network | | at Fresno State | W 65–61 | 17–13 (10–7) | Save Mart Center (1,365); Fresno, CA |
| March 4, 2025; 7:00 pm, MW Network | | Air Force | W 77–74 | 18–13 (11–7) | The Pit (5,437); Albuquerque, NM |
Mountain West tournament
| March 10, 2025; 3:30 pm, MW Network | (5) | vs. (4) San Diego State; Quarterfinals | L 53–63 | 18–14 | Thomas & Mack Center (1,998); Paradise, NV |
*Non-conference game. ^{#}Rankings from AP Poll. (#) Tournament seedings in parentheses. All times are in Mountain.
