= 2025 Mountain West Conference women's basketball tournament =

American college basketball competition

- Classification: Division I
- Season: 2024–25
- Teams: 11
- Site: Thomas & Mack Center; Paradise, Nevada
- Champions: San Diego State (3rd title)
- Winning coach: Stacie Terry-Hutson (1st title)
- MVP: Veronica Sheffey (San Diego State)
- Television: Stadium/MWN, CBSSN

2024–25 Mountain West Conference women's basketball standings
	Conf.				Overall
Team	W		L	PCT	W		L	PCT
UNLV	16	–	2	.889	26	–	8	.765
Wyoming	14	–	4	.778	22	–	12	.647
Colorado State	13	–	5	.722	22	–	10	.688
San Diego State †	11	–	7	.611	25	–	10	.714
New Mexico	11	–	7	.611	18	–	14	.563
Fresno State	8	–	10	.444	19	–	15	.559
Air Force	7	–	11	.389	18	–	15	.545
Boise State	7	–	11	.389	18	–	15	.545
Nevada	6	–	12	.333	11	–	21	.344
Utah State	3	–	15	.167	4	–	27	.129
San Jose State	3	–	15	.167	10	–	22	.313
† 2025 Mountain West tournament winner

The 2025 Mountain West Conference women's basketball tournament was the postseason women's basketball tournament for the Mountain West Conference. It was held March 9-12, 2025, from the Thomas & Mack Center located on the campus of University of Nevada, Las Vegas, in Paradise, Nevada. In the final, San Diego State defeated Wyoming in triple overtime, and received an automatic bid to the NCAA tournament.

== Seeds ==
All 11 Mountain West schools will participate in the tournament. Teams are to be seeded by conference record with a tiebreaker system to seed teams with identical percentages. The top five teams will receive byes into the tournament quarterfinals. The remaining teams will play in the first round. Tie-breaking procedures remained unchanged since the 2020 tournament.

- Head-to-head record between the tied teams
- Record against the highest-seeded team not involved in the tie, going down through the seedings as necessary
- Higher NET

Seed	School	Conf	Tiebreaker(s)
1	UNLV	16–2	
2	Wyoming	14–4	
3	Colorado State	13–5	
4	San Diego State	11–7	1–1 vs. UNLV
5	New Mexico	11–7	0–2 vs. UNLV
6	Fresno State	8–10	
7	Air Force	7–11	0–1 vs. UNLV
8	Boise State	7–11	0–2 vs. UNLV
9	Nevada	6–12	
10	Utah State	3–15	2–0 vs. San Jose State
11	San Jose State	3–15	0–2 vs. Utah State

== Schedule ==
Game	Time	Matchup	Score	Television	Attendance
First round – Sunday, March 9
1	2:00 pm	No. 8 Boise State vs. No. 9 Nevada	54–48	Stadium/MWN	
2	4:30 pm	No. 7 Air Force vs. No. 10 Utah State	59–66	Stadium/MWN	
3	7:00 pm	No. 6 Fresno State vs. No. 11 San Jose State	67–62	Stadium/MWN	
Quarterfinals – Monday, March 10
4	12:00 pm	No. 1 UNLV vs. No. 8 Boise State	80–70	Stadium/MWN	
5	2:30 pm	No. 4 San Diego State vs. No. 5 New Mexico	63–53	Stadium/MWN	
6	5:00 pm	No. 2 Wyoming vs. No. 7 Air Force	77–64	Stadium/MWN	
7	7:30 pm	No. 3 Colorado State vs. No. 6 Fresno State	52–54	Stadium/MWN	
Semifinals – Tuesday, March 11
8	5:00 pm	No. 1 UNLV vs. No. 4 San Diego State	59–71	Stadium/MWN	
9	7:30 pm	No. 2 Wyoming vs. No. 6 Fresno State	57–45	Stadium/MWN	
Championship – Wednesday, March 12
10	7:30 pm	No. 2 Wyoming vs. No. 4 San Diego State	68–72 ^{3OT}	CBSSN	
Game times in PDT. Rankings denote tournament seeding.

== Bracket ==
First round Sunday, March 9 Stadium/MWN
8	Boise State	54
9	Nevada	48
7	Air Force	66
10	Utah State	59
6	Fresno State	67
11	San Jose State	62

Quarterfinals; Monday, March 10; Stadium/MWN
1	UNLV	80
8	Boise State	70
4	San Diego State	63
5	New Mexico	53
2	Wyoming	77
7	Air Force	64
3	Colorado State	52
6	Fresno State	54

Semifinals; Tuesday, March 11; Stadium/MWN
1	UNLV	59
4	San Diego State	71
2	Wyoming	57
6	Fresno State	45

Championship; Wednesday, March 12; CBSSN
4	San Diego State	72***
2	Wyoming	68
