= 2024–25 UNLV Lady Rebels basketball team =

American college basketball season

2024–25 UNLV Lady Rebels basketball

Mountain West regular season champions

WBIT, Second Round
- Conference: Mountain West Conference
- Record: 26–8 (16–2 MW)
- Head coach: Lindy La Rocque (5th season)
- Associate head coach: Roman Owen
- Assistant coaches: Mia Bell; Karlie Burris
- Home arena: Cox Pavilion; Thomas & Mack Center

2024–25 Mountain West Conference women's basketball standings
	Conf.				Overall
Team	W		L	PCT	W		L	PCT
UNLV	16	–	2	.889	26	–	8	.765
Wyoming	14	–	4	.778	22	–	12	.647
Colorado State	13	–	5	.722	22	–	10	.688
San Diego State †	11	–	7	.611	25	–	10	.714
New Mexico	11	–	7	.611	18	–	14	.563
Fresno State	8	–	10	.444	19	–	15	.559
Air Force	7	–	11	.389	18	–	15	.545
Boise State	7	–	11	.389	18	–	15	.545
Nevada	6	–	12	.333	11	–	21	.344
Utah State	3	–	15	.167	4	–	27	.129
San Jose State	3	–	15	.167	10	–	22	.313
† 2025 Mountain West tournament winner

The 2024–25 UNLV Lady Rebels basketball team represented the University of Nevada, Las Vegas during the 2024–25 NCAA Division I women's basketball season. The Lady Rebels, led by fifth-year head coach Lindy La Rocque, played their home games at the Cox Pavilion, attached to the Thomas & Mack Center in Paradise, Nevada as members of the Mountain West Conference.

== Previous season ==
The Lady Rebels finished the 2023–24 season 30–3, 17–1 in Mountain West play, to finish as Mountain West regular season champions. They defeated Fresno State, Colorado State, and San Diego State to win their third straight Mountain West tournament championship, and earned the conference's automatic bid to the NCAA tournament. They received the #10 seed in the Albany Regional 2, where they would fall to #7 region seed Creighton in the first round.

== Preseason ==
On October 16, 2024, the Mountain West Conference released their preseason coaches poll. UNLV was picked to finish first in the Mountain West regular season.

=== Preseason rankings ===
Mountain West preseason poll
Predicted finish	Team	Votes (1st place)
1	UNLV	298 (21)
2	Wyoming	251 (3)
3	Colorado State	248 (4)
4	Boise State	221
5	San Diego State	218 (2)
6	New Mexico	172
7	Nevada	125
8	Air Force	116
9	Fresno State	109
10	San Jose State	60
11	Utah State	41

=== Preseason All-Mountain West Team ===
Preseason All-Mountain West Team
Player	Position	Year
Alyssa Brown	Forward	Senior
Kiara Jackson	Guard	Senior
Amarachi Kimpson	Guard	Sophomore

== Roster ==
2024–25 UNLV Lady Rebels women's basketball team
Players
Coaches

Pos.	#	Name	Height	Year	Previous school	Hometown
G	0	Teagan Colvin	5 ft 7 in (1.7 m)	Fr	Coeur d'Alene High School	Coeur d'Alene, Idaho
G	2	Kenadee Winfrey	5 ft 11 in (1.8 m)	RS Jr	Canyon High School	Canyon, Texas
G	3	Kiara Jackson	5 ft 8 in (1.73 m)	Sr	South Grand Prairie High School	Grand Prairie, Texas
G	10	Jasmyn Lott	5 ft 8 in (1.73 m)	RS Jr	Frisco Memorial High School	Frisco, Texas
G	14	Macy Spencer	5 ft 9 in (1.75 m)	So	Tompkins High School	Katy, Texas
F	20	Macie James	5 ft 11 in (1.8 m)	Sr	Oklahoma State	Fresno, California
F	21	McKinna Brackens	6 ft 1 in (1.85 m)	So	Fairfield High School	Fairfield, Texas
G	22	Elli Guiney	5 ft 11 in (1.8 m)	Fr	Millennium High School	Goodyear, Arizona
G	25	Aaliyah Alexander	5 ft 8 in (1.73 m)	GS	Eastern Washington	Federal Way, Washington
C	31	Erica Collins	6 ft 3 in (1.91 m)	Jr	Chino Hills High School	Chino Hills, California
F	32	Meadow Roland	6 ft 2 in (1.88 m)	RS Fr	San Joaquin Memorial High School	Fresno, California
G	33	Amarachi Kimpson	5 ft 8 in (1.73 m)	So	Little Elm High School	Little Elm, Texas
F	44	Alyssa Brown	6 ft 1 in (1.85 m)	Sr	Sahuaro High School	Tucson, Arizona

Head coach

- Lindy La Rocque (Stanford)

Assistant coach(es)

- Roman Owen (Southwestern Christian)
- Mia Bell (UNLV)
- Karlie Burris (Portland)

Legend

- (C) Team captain
- (S) Suspended
- (I) Ineligible
- (W) Walk-on
- Injured
- Current redshirt

Roster
Last update: March 15, 2025

== Postseason honors and awards ==
All-Mountain West Team
Player	Position	Year
Kiara Jackson	Guard	Senior
Amarachi Kimpson	Guard	Sophomore

Mountain West All Defensive Team
Player	Position	Year
Alyssa Brown	Forward	Senior

Mountain West All Freshman Team
Player	Position	Year
Meadow Roland	Forward	Redshirt-Freshman

Mountain West Sixth Player of the Year
Player	Position	Year
Meadow Roland	Forward	Redshirt-Freshman

Mountain West Coach of the Year
Player	Position	Year
Lindy La Rocque	Head Coach	Fourth

== Schedule and results ==
Date time, TV	Rank^{#}	Opponent^{#}	Result	Record	High points	High rebounds	High assists	Site (attendance) city, state
Exhibition
October 29, 2024*; 6:30 pm		Point Loma	W 94–63	–	14 – Tied	12 – Roland	5 – Jackson	Cox Pavilion (572); Paradise, NV
Non-conference regular season
November 4, 2024*; 6:30 pm, MWN/SSSEN		Loyola Marymount	W 73–57	1–0	16 – Alexander	10 – Roland	6 – Jackson	Cox Pavilion; Paradise, NV
November 7, 2024*; 11:00 am, MWN/SSSEN		Northern Arizona	W 85–71	2–0	19 – Kimpson	16 – Roland	6 – Jackson	Thomas & Mack Center (803); Paradise, NV
November 12, 2024*; 5:00 pm, ESPN+		at Arizona	L 66–75	2–1	14 – Tied	7 – Roland	5 – Jackson	McKale Center (7,221); Tucson, AZ
November 15, 2024*; 6:30 pm, MWN/SSSEN		Stonehill	W 93–57	3–1	20 – Spencer	9 – Brown	7 – Jackson	Cox Pavilion (835); Paradise, NV
November 19, 2024*; 6:30 pm, MWN/SSSEN		San Diego	W 88–54	4–1	15 – Roland	9 – Roland	4 – Jackson	Cox Pavilion (848); Paradise, NV
November 22, 2024*; 6:30 pm, MWN/SSSEN		No. 9 Oklahoma	L 58–88	4–2	20 – Jackson	10 – Jackson	3 – Tied	Thomas & Mack Center (2,753); Paradise, NV
November 27, 2024*; 12:00 pm, MWN/SSSEN		UCF; UNLV Thanksgiving Classic	W 71–52	5–2	19 – Brackens	14 – Brackens	9 – Jackson	Thomas & Mack Center; Paradise, NV
November 29, 2024*; 2:30 pm, MWN/SSSEN		East Carolina; UNLV Thanksgiving Classic	W 64–49	6–2	17 – Brackens	5 – Tied	6 – Jackson	Thomas & Mack Center (906); Paradise, NV
December 8, 2024*; 12:00 pm, ESPN+		at Baylor	L 64–71	6–3	18 – Jackson	7 – Jackson	9 – Jackson	Foster Pavilion (3,972); Waco, TX
December 15, 2024*; 12:00 pm, FloHoops		at DePaul	W 80–61	7–3	25 – Alexander	8 – Kimpson	4 – Brown	Wintrust Arena (1,547); Chicago, IL
December 18, 2024*; 9:00 am, B1G+		at Northwestern	L 76–79 ^{OT}	7–4	28 – Kimpson	8 – Brackens	5 – Brackens	Welsh–Ryan Arena (1,092); Evanston, IL
December 21, 2024*; 2:30 pm, MWN/SSSEN		UC Riverside	W 80–57	8–4	13 – Kimpson	7 – Roland	5 – Jackson	Thomas & Mack Center (936); Paradise, NV
Mountain West regular season
December 29, 2024; 2:00 pm, MWN/SSSEN		Fresno State	W 78–53	9–4 (1–0)	15 – Brackens	8 – Tied	6 – Brown	Cox Pavilion (1,008); Paradise, NV
January 1, 2025; 1:00 pm, MWN		at San Jose State	W 90–70	10–4 (2–0)	20 – Tied	10 – Brown	5 – Jackson	Provident Credit Union Event Center (356); San Jose, CA
January 4, 2025; 5:00 pm, MWN		at Boise State	W 61–57	11–4 (3–0)	18 – Jackson	9 – Brown	3 – Jackson	ExtraMile Arena (1,946); Boise, ID
January 8, 2025; 6:30 pm, MWN/SSSEN		Colorado State	W 70–61	12–4 (4–0)	21 – Alexander	5 – Tied	5 – Kimpson	Cox Pavilion (875); Paradise, NV
January 12, 2025; 1:00 pm, CBSSN		at New Mexico	W 88–73	13–4 (5–0)	20 – Brackens	15 – Brown	9 – Jackson	The Pit (5,767); Albuquerque, NM
January 15, 2025; 6:00 pm, MWN/SSSEN		Air Force	W 84–51	14–4 (6–0)	19 – Kimpson	12 – Brown	4 – Kimpson	Cox Pavilion (957); Paradise, NV
January 19, 2025; 1:00 pm, CBSSN		Wyoming	W 72–71 ^{OT}	15–4 (7–0)	22 – Kimpson	13 – Brown	4 – Jackson	Cox Pavilion (1,410); Paradise, NV
January 22, 2025; 6:00 pm, MWN		at Fresno State	W 73–48	16–4 (8–0)	16 – Roland	7 – Roland	5 – Jackson	Save Mart Center (1,029); Fresno, CA
January 25, 2025; 1:00 pm, MWN		at San Diego State	L 58–59	16–5 (8–1)	13 – James	8 – Brown	6 – Jackson	Viejas Arena (2,154); San Diego, CA
February 1, 2025; 2:00 pm, MWN/SSSEN		Nevada	W 68–59	17–5 (9–1)	17 – Roland	9 – Roland	11 – Jackson	Cox Pavilion (1,961); Paradise, NV
February 5, 2025; 5:00 pm, MWN		at Utah State	W 89–51	18–5 (10–1)	16 – Roland	7 – Tied	7 – Jackson	Smith Spectrum (544); Logan, UT
February 8, 2025; 2:00 pm, MWN/SSSEN		New Mexico	W 90–65	19–5 (11–1)	15 – Alexander	9 – Roland	4 – Tied	Cox Pavilion (1,376); Paradise, NV
February 12, 2025; 6:30 pm, MWN/SSSEN		San Diego State	W 75–65	20–5 (12–1)	27 – Jackson	6 – Tied	9 – Jackson	Cox Pavilion (928); Paradise, NV
February 15, 2025; 1:00 pm, MWN		at Nevada	W 64–50	21–5 (13–1)	18 – Alexander	7 – Roland	3 – Jackson	Lawlor Events Center; Reno, NV
February 22, 2025; 12:00 pm, MWN		at Colorado State	W 69–65	22–5 (14–1)	18 – Brackens	10 – Brown	3 – Tied	Moby Arena (2,559); Fort Collins, CO
February 26, 2025; 6:30 pm, MWN/SSSEN		Boise State	W 83–53	23–5 (15–1)	23 – Kimpson	10 – Brown	4 – Tied	Cox Pavilion (1,234); Paradise, NV
March 1, 2025; 2:00 pm, MWN/SSSEN		San Jose State	W 89–56	24–5 (16–1)	24 – Roland	13 – Brown	6 – Jackson	Cox Pavilion (2,141); Paradise, NV
March 5, 2025; 7:30 pm, FS1		at Wyoming	L 66–71	24–6 (16–2)	24 – Kimpson	10 – Brown	2 – Kimpson	Arena-Auditorium (3,601); Laramie, WY
Mountain West tournament
March 10, 2025; 12:00 pm, MWN	(1)	(8) Boise State; Quarterfinals	W 80–70	25–6	29 – Kimpson	10 – Brown	3 – Alexander	Thomas & Mack Center; Paradise, NV
March 11, 2025; 5:00 pm, MWN	(1)	(4) San Diego State; Semifinals	L 59–71	25–7	15 – Brown	10 – Brackens	6 – Jackson	Thomas & Mack Center; Paradise, NV
WBIT
March 20, 2025*; 6:30 pm, ESPN+	(2)	Hawai'i; First Round	W 63–46	26–7	16 – Roland	12 – Brackens	4 – Tied	Cox Pavilion (800); Paradise, NV
March 23, 2025*; 2:00 pm, ESPN+	(2)	(3) Florida; Second Round	L 84–86	26–8	24 – Kimpson	11 – Brown	8 – Jackson	Cox Pavilion (645); Paradise, NV
*Non-conference game. ^{#}Rankings from AP poll. (#) Tournament seedings in parentheses. All times are in Pacific.
