= Justin Hutson =

American basketball player and coach (born 1971)

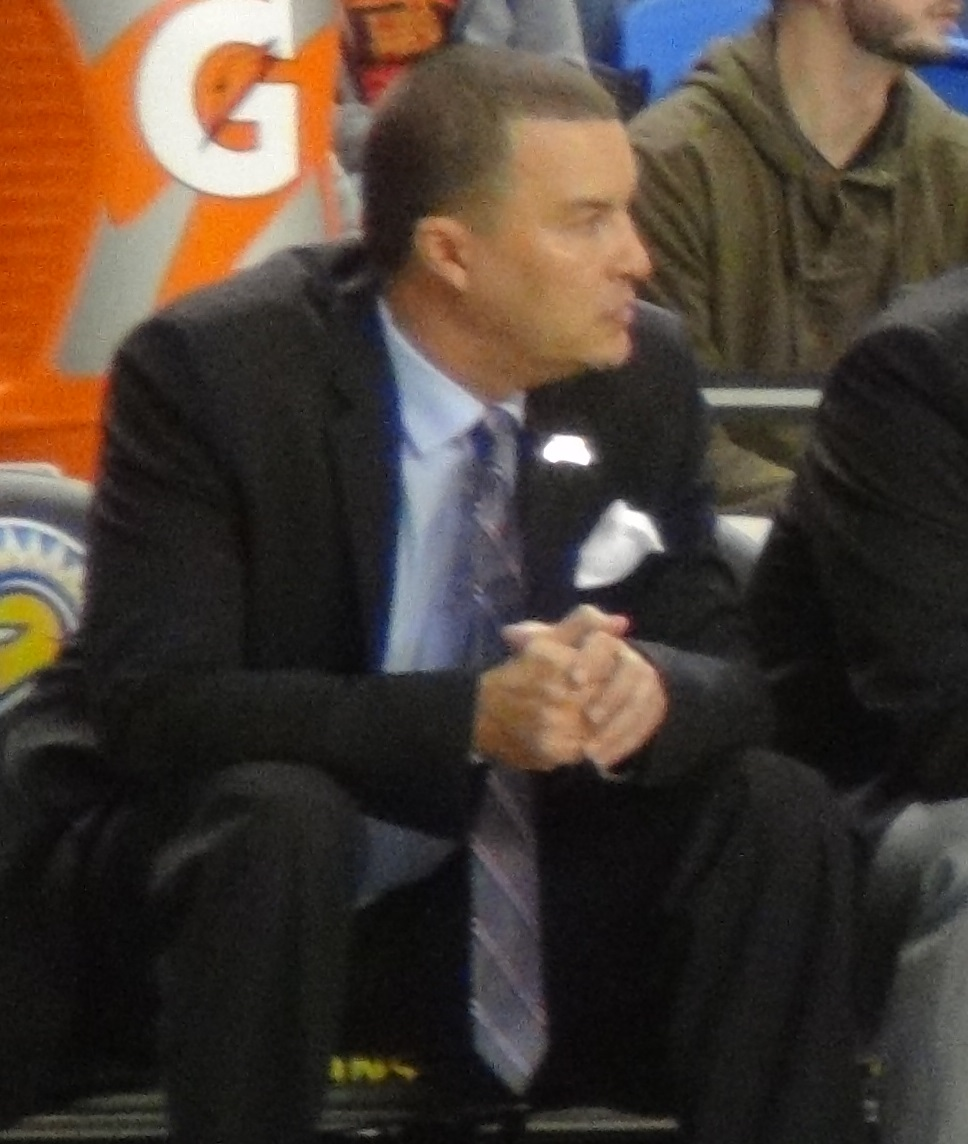
- Hutson in 2017

Current position
- Title: Assistant coach
- Team: San Diego State Aztecs
- Conference: Pac-12

Biographical details
- Born: October 16, 1971 (age 55); Bakersfield, California, U.S.

Playing career
- 1989–1990: Bakersfield College
- 1990–1992: Ventura
- 1992–1994: Cal State Bakersfield

Coaching career (HC unless noted)
- 1998–2000: Cal State Bakersfield (assistant)
- 2000–2004: Bakersfield HS
- 2005–2006: Cal Poly (assistant)
- 2006–2011: San Diego State (assistant)
- 2011–2013: UNLV (assistant)
- 2013–2018: San Diego State (assistant)
- 2018–2024: Fresno State
- 2024: San Diego (assistant)
- 2024–present: San Diego State (women's assistant)

Head coaching record
- Overall: 92–94 (.495) (college)
- Tournaments: 4–0 (TBC)

Accomplishments and honors

Championships
- TBC (2022)

Justin Lee Hutson (born October 16, 1971) is an American college basketball coach who is an assistant for the San Diego State Aztecs women's basketball team, a position he has held since 2024. He was previously the San Diego Toreros in the beginning of 2024. He was also the head coach of the Fresno State Bulldogs men's basketball team from 2018 to 2024.

== Playing career ==
Hutson began his college basketball career at two junior colleges, first Bakersfield College in 1989–90 then Ventura College from 1990 to 1992. From 1992 to 1994, Hutson played at Cal State Bakersfield, which was NCAA Division II at the time. Hutson was a member of the Roadrunners' 1993 NCAA Championship and 1994 NCAA Championship squads.

== Coaching career ==
In 1998, Hutson got his coaching start at his alma mater as an assistant coach for two seasons before moving on to become the head boys' basketball coach at Bakersfield HS from 2000 to 2004. He returned to the college ranks for a one-year stop at Cal Poly as an assistant coach before landing on Steve Fisher's staff at San Diego State in 2006. Hutson stayed in the position until 2011, when he accepted an assistant coaching position at UNLV on Dave Rice's staff.

In 2013, Hutson returned to San Diego State as an assistant, until April 5, 2018, when he was named the 21st head coach in Fresno State history, replacing Rodney Terry, who departed for the head coaching position at UTEP. On March 14, 2024, following Fresno State's loss earlier that day to Utah State in the Mountain West Tournament, Hutson announced that he had been fired. Hutson posted an overall record of 92–94 in his six years with the program.

On October 1, 2024, Hutson was hired as an assistant for the San Diego Toreros men's basketball team. However in December 4, 2024, Hutson returned to San Diego State as an assistant for the women's basketball team under his wife Stacie.

== Head coaching record ==
=== College ===
Record table
Season	Team	Overall	Conference	Standing	Postseason
Fresno State Bulldogs (Mountain West Conference) (2018–2024)
2018–19	Fresno State	23–9	13–5	3rd	
2019–20	Fresno State	11–19	7–11	T–7th	
2020–21	Fresno State	12–12	9–11	6th	
2021–22	Fresno State	23–13	8–9	6th	TBC Champion
2022–23	Fresno State	11–20	6–12	T–8th	
2023–24	Fresno State	12–21	4–14	9th	
Fresno State:		92–94 (.495)	47–62 (.431)		
Total:		92–94 (.495)			
