= San Diego State Aztecs women's basketball =

College women's basketball team

2026–27 San Diego State Aztecs women's basketball team
- University: San Diego State University
- First season: 1976–77
- Head coach: Stacie Terry-Hutson (14th season)
- Location: San Diego, California
- Arena: Viejas Arena (capacity: 12,414)
- Conference: Pac-12
- Nickname: Aztecs
- Colors: Scarlet and black

NCAA Division I tournament Sweet Sixteen
- 1984, 1985, 2010

NCAA Division I tournament appearances
- 1984, 1985, 1993, 1994, 1995, 1997, 2009, 2010, 2012, 2025

Conference tournament champions
- 1994, 1997, 2010, 2012, 2025

Conference regular-season champions
- 1994, 1995, 1997, 2009, 2012, 2013, 2026

Uniforms
Home	Away	Alternate

For information on all San Diego State University sports, see San Diego State Aztecs

The San Diego State Aztecs women's basketball team is the women's college basketball program that represents San Diego State University (SDSU). The Aztecs compete in NCAA Division I as a member of the Pac-12 Conference. The team plays its home games at Viejas Arena.

== Post-season results ==
=== Regular season conference championships ===
Western Athletic Conference (3)

- 1994, 1995, 1997

Mountain West Conference (4)

- 2009, 2012, 2013, 2026

=== Conference tournament championships ===
Western Athletic Conference tournament (2)

- 1994, 1997

Mountain West Conference tournament (3)

- 2010, 2012, 2025

== NCAA tournament results ==
San Diego State has a record of 6−10 in the NCAA tournament.

Year	Seed	Round	Opponent	Result
1984	#6	First Round; Sweet Sixteen	#3 Oregon #2 Long Beach State	W 70−63; L 73−91
1985	#5	First Round; Sweet Sixteen	#4 UNLV #1 Louisiana Tech	W 70−68; L 64−94
1993	#9	First Round	#8 Georgia	L 68−85
1994	#5	First Round; Second Round	#12 Hawaii #13 Texas A&M	W 81−75; L 72−75
1995	#5	First Round	#12 Montana	L 46−57
1997	#11	First Round	#6 Oregon	L 62−79
2009	#10	First Round; Second Round	#7 DePaul #2 Stanford	W 76−70; L 49−77
2010	#11	First Round; Second Round; Sweet Sixteen	#6 Texas #3 West Virginia #2 Duke	W 74−63; W 64−55; L 58−66
2012	#12	First Round	#5 LSU	L 56−64
2025	#14	First Round	#3 LSU	L 48−103

== WNIT tournament results ==
Year	Round	Opponent	Result
1989	First Round; Second Round; Final	Radford; Murray State; Oregon	W 99−92; W 97−81; L 64−67
2013	First Round; Second Round	UC Santa Barbara; BYU	W 69−46; L 58−69
2023	First Round	UC Irvine	L 45−55

== WBIT tournament results ==
Year	Seed	Round	Opponent	Result
2026	#4	First Round; Second Round; Quarterfinals	UC Irvine; McNeese #2 Kansas	W 61–55; W 56–41; TBD

== Head coaches ==
Head Coach	Seasons	Overall	Pct.
Kathleen Wallace	1976–1978	14–34	.292
Richie Spears	1979–1983	88–58	.603
Steve Salvo	1983	3–10	.231
Earnest Riggins	1984–1989	118–67	.638
Beth Burns	1990–1997; 2005–2013	295–186	.613
Barb Smith	1997–2002	49–86	.363
Jim Tomey	2002–2005	25–58	.301
Stacie Terry-Hutson	2013–present	154–185	.454
