= 2025–26 Air Force Falcons women's basketball team =

American college basketball season

2025–26 Air Force Falcons women's basketball

WNIT, First Round
- Conference: Mountain West Conference
- Record: 16–19 (7–13 MW)
- Head coach: Stacy McIntyre (2nd season)
- Associate head coach: Adam Wardenburg
- Assistant coaches: Rynae Rasley; Lauren Brocke; Kendall Folley
- Home arena: Clune Arena

2025–26 Mountain West Conference women's basketball standings
| | Conf. | | | | Overall |
| Team | W | | L | PCT | W | | L | PCT |
|---|---|---|---|---|---|---|---|---|
| San Diego State | 19 | – | 1 | .950 | 27 | – | 6 | .818 |
| UNLV | 15 | – | 5 | .750 | 21 | – | 11 | .656 |
| Colorado State † | 15 | – | 5 | .750 | 27 | – | 8 | .771 |
| New Mexico | 14 | – | 6 | .700 | 22 | – | 10 | .688 |
| Boise State | 14 | – | 6 | .700 | 25 | – | 9 | .735 |
| Grand Canyon | 11 | – | 9 | .550 | 13 | – | 19 | .406 |
| Fresno State | 8 | – | 12 | .400 | 15 | – | 18 | .455 |
| Wyoming | 7 | – | 13 | .350 | 10 | – | 20 | .333 |
| Air Force | 7 | – | 13 | .350 | 16 | – | 19 | .457 |
| Nevada | 6 | – | 14 | .300 | 10 | – | 21 | .323 |
| Utah State | 2 | – | 18 | .100 | 6 | – | 24 | .200 |
| San Jose State | 2 | – | 18 | .100 | 4 | – | 28 | .125 |
† 2026 Mountain West tournament winner

The 2025–26 Air Force Falcons women's basketball team represented the United States Air Force Academy during the 2025–26 NCAA Division I women's basketball season. The Falcons, led by second-year head coach Stacy McIntyre, played their home games at Clune Arena in Air Force Academy, Colorado as members of the Mountain West Conference.

== Previous season ==
The Falcons finished the 2024–25 season 18–15, 7–11 in Mountain West play, to finish in a tie for seventh place. They defeated Utah State, before falling to Wyoming in the quarterfinals of the Mountain West tournament. They received an at-large bid to the WNIT, where they would be defeated by Utah Valley in the first round.

== Preseason ==
On October 22, 2025, the Mountain West Conference released their preseason poll. Air Force was picked to finish eighth in the conference.

=== Preseason rankings ===
MW Preseason Poll
| Place | Team | Votes |
|---|---|---|
| 1 | UNLV | 281 (19) |
| 2 | San Diego State | 240 (3) |
| 3 | Colorado State | 236 (1) |
| 4 | Boise State | 210 (1) |
| 5 | New Mexico | 207 (2) |
| 6 | Wyoming | 194 |
| 7 | Grand Canyon | 177 (1) |
| 8 | Air Force | 132 |
| 9 | Fresno State | 95 |
| 10 | Nevada | 92 |
| 11 | Utah State | 54 |
| 12 | San Jose State | 44 |
(#) first-place votes

=== Preseason All-MW Team ===
Preseason All-MW Team
| Position | Player | Year |
|---|---|---|
| Guard | Milahnie Perry | Senior |

== Roster ==
2025–26 Air Force Falcons women's basketball team
Players
Coaches

| Pos. | # | Name | Height | Year | Previous school | Hometown |
|---|---|---|---|---|---|---|
| G | 0 | Jordyn DeVaughn | 5 ft 6 in (1.68 m) | Jr | Lone Star High School | Little Elm, Texas |
| G | 1 | Alexis Cortez | 5 ft 11 in (1.8 m) | Jr | Allen High School | Allen, Texas |
| G | 2 | Milahnie Perry | 5 ft 7 in (1.7 m) | Sr | Seffner Christian Academy | Tampa, Florida |
| G | 4 | AJ Mannering | 5 ft 8 in (1.73 m) | Fr | USAFA Prep | Peyton, Colorado |
| F | 5 | Sydney Roundtree | 6 ft 0 in (1.83 m) | So | Bishop Kenny High School | Jacksonville, Florida |
| G | 9 | Maddy Jensen | 5 ft 7 in (1.7 m) | Fr | Brookfield Central High School | Brookfield, Wisconsin |
| G | 10 | Jayda McNabb | 5 ft 10 in (1.78 m) | Jr | USAFA Prep | Rapid City, South Dakota |
| G | 11 | Eva Love | 5 ft 9 in (1.75 m) | Fr | USAFA Prep | Albuquerque, New Mexico |
| F | 12 | Tanah Gorman | 6 ft 0 in (1.83 m) | So | Bishop Ireton High School | Huntingtown, Maryland |
| G | 13 | Keelie O'Hollaren | 5 ft 10 in (1.78 m) | Jr | Lakeridge High School | Lake Oswego, Oregon |
| G | 14 | Bhret Clay | 5 ft 10 in (1.78 m) | Fr | Hobbs High School | Hobbs, New Mexico |
| F | 23 | Julia Leach | 6 ft 2 in (1.88 m) | Fr | Cherry Creek High School | Greenwood Village, Colorado |
| G | 24 | Marissa Hargrave | 5 ft 8 in (1.73 m) | Jr | Andress High School | El Paso, Texas |
| F | 31 | Emily Adams | 6 ft 0 in (1.83 m) | Sr | Bishop Fenwick High School | Lebanon, Ohio |

Head coach

- Stacy McIntyre (Kentucky)

Assistant coach(es)

- Adam Wardenburg (Utah State)
- Rynae Rasley (CCNY)
- Lauren Brocke (Colorado State)
- Kendall Folley (East Tennessee State)

Legend

- (C) Team captain
- (S) Suspended
- (I) Ineligible
- (W) Walk-on
- Injured
- Current redshirt

Roster
Last update: January 20, 2026

== Schedule and results ==
| Date time, TV | Rank^{#} | Opponent^{#} | Result | Record | High points | High rebounds | High assists | Site (attendance) city, state |
Non-conference regular season
| November 3, 2025*; 6:00 pm, SLN/Altitude 2 | | at Denver | W 59–50 | 1–0 | 13 – Tied | 9 – McNabb | 5 – McNabb | Hamilton Gymnasium (594); Denver, CO |
| November 7, 2025*; 10:00 am, Midco Sports/SLN | | at South Dakota | L 50–75 | 1–1 | 13 – Perry | 9 – Adams | 2 – Tied | Sanford Coyote Sports Center (1,592); Vermillion, SD |
| November 10, 2025*; 7:00 pm, ESPN+ | | at Oregon State | L 49–60 | 1–2 | 13 – O'Hollaren | 7 – McNabb | 5 – Perry | Gill Coliseum (3,079); Corvallis, OR |
| November 15, 2025*; 3:00 pm, MWN | | Manhattan | W 67–54 | 2–2 | 17 – Tied | 9 – McNabb | 3 – Perry | Clune Arena (644); Air Force Academy, CO |
| November 18, 2025*; 6:30 pm, Altitude | | Portland State | W 65−55 | 3−2 | 20 – Perry | 6 – Tied | 4 – Perry | Clune Arena (1,041); Air Force Academy, CO |
| November 22, 2025*; 3:00 pm, ESPN+ | | at UC San Diego | L 43−55 | 3−3 | 15 – Perry | 14 – McNabb | 2 – Tied | LionTree Arena (1,282); La Jolla, CA |
| November 27, 2025*; 10:00 am, ESPN+ | | at Florida Atlantic; FAU Thanksgiving Classic | L 71–76 | 3–4 | 27 – Perry | 6 – Hargrave | 4 – Perry | Eleanor R. Baldwin Arena (457); Boca Raton, FL |
| November 29, 2025*; 11:00 am, FloCollege | | vs. Wright State; FAU Thanksgiving Classic | W 59–49 | 4–4 | 19 – Perry | 11 – Tied | 4 – Hargrave | Eleanor R. Baldwin Arena; Boca Raton, FL |
| December 6, 2025*; 2:00 pm, ESPN+ | | at Utah Valley | W 58–50 | 5–4 | 24 – Perry | 10 – McNabb | 5 – DeVaughn | UCCU Center (539); Orem, UT |
| December 13, 2025*; 1:00 pm, MWN | | New Mexico Highlands | W 65–64 | 6–4 | 16 – DeVaughn | 13 – McNabb | 7 – McNabb | Clune Arena; Air Force Academy, CO |
Mountain West regular season
| December 17, 2025; 6:00 pm, MWN | | at Utah State | L 53–65 | 6–5 (0–1) | 16 – O'Hollaren | 10 – McNabb | 3 – Perry | Smith Spectrum (453); Logan, UT |
| December 20, 2025; 1:00 pm, MWN | | Nevada | W 61−45 | 7−5 (1–1) | 16 – Perry | 7 – McNabb | 3 – Tied | Clune Arena (368); Air Force Academy, CO |
| December 31, 2025; 2:00 pm, MWN | | at San Diego State | L 51–62 | 7–6 (1–2) | 18 – Perry | 7 – Clay | 2 – McNabb | Viejas Arena (1,174); San Diego, CA |
| January 3, 2026; 1:00 pm, MWN | | UNLV | L 58–64 | 7–7 (1–3) | 14 – Tied | 8 – McNabb | 4 – Tied | Clune Arena (678); Air Force Academy, CO |
| January 7, 2026; 6:30 pm, Altitude | | Boise State | L 59–70 | 7–8 (1–4) | 17 – Perry | 7 – McNabb | 5 – DeVaughn | Clune Arena (526); Air Force Academy, CO |
| January 10, 2026; 3:00 pm, NBCSBA | | at San Jose State | W 76–57 | 8–8 (2–4) | 25 – O'Hollaren | 10 – Hargrave | 6 – Hargrave | Provident Credit Union Event Center (302); San Jose, CA |
| January 14, 2026; 6:30 pm, MWN | | Colorado State | L 63–65 | 8–9 (2–5) | 31 – Perry | 5 – Tied | 3 – Perry | Clune Arena; Air Force Academy, CO |
| January 17, 2026; 2:00 pm, MWN | | at Wyoming | L 44–67 | 8–10 (2–6) | 16 – McNabb | 11 – McNabb | 2 – Tied | Arena-Auditorium (1,915); Laramie, WY |
| January 21, 2026; 7:30 pm, MWN | | at UNLV | L 47-78 | 8-11 (2-7) | 12 – Adams | 9 – Adams | 4 – McNabb | Cox Pavilion (537); Paradise, NV |
| January 24, 2026; 1:00 pm, MWN | | New Mexico | L 57-74 | 8-12 (2-8) | 14 – O'Halloren | 9 – McNabb | 4 – McNabb | Clune Arena (1,194); Air Force Academy, CO |
| January 31, 2026; 4:00 pm, MWN | | at Fresno State | W 61-56 | 9-12 (3-8) | 27 – Perry | 18 – McNabb | 7 – O'Halloren | Save Mart Center (1,162); Fresno, CA |
| February 4, 2026; 6:30 pm, MWN | | Utah State | W 73-50 | 10-12 (4-8) | 23 – Adams | 12 – Adams | 6 – Perry | Clune Arena (838); Air Force Academy, CO |
| February 7, 2026; 1:00 pm, MWN | | Grand Canyon | W 65-64 | 11-12 (5-8) | 26 – Perry | 10 – Adams | 6 – McNabb | Clune Arena (941); Air Force Academy, CO |
| February 11, 2026; 7:30 pm, MWN | | at Nevada | L 59-76 | 11-13 (5-9) | 20 – Perry | 6 – Hargrave | 3 – McNabb | Lawlor Events Center (1,244); Reno, NV |
| February 14, 2026; 1:00 pm, MWN | | San Jose State | W 77-61 | 12-13 (6-9) | 20 – Perry | 7 – Tied | 3 – Hargrave | Clune Arena (548); Air Force Academy, CO |
| February 18, 2026; 6:30 pm, MWN | | at Boise State | L 62-70 | 12-14 (6-10) | 20 – Perry | 9 – Adams | 3 – Cortez | ExtraMile Arena (1,835); Boise, ID |
| February 21, 2026; 1:00 pm, MWN | | at New Mexico | L 53-73 | 12-15 (6-11) | 10 – Tied | 7 – McNabb | 4 – Adams | The Pit (5,505); Albuquerque, NM |
| February 25, 2026; 11:00 am, Altitude | | Wyoming | W 69-61 ^{OT} | 13-15 (7-11) | 18 – Adams | 8 – McNabb | 5 – McNabb | Clune Arena (1,515); Air Force Academy, CO |
| February 28, 2026; 1:00 pm, MWN | | at Colorado State | L 52-66 | 13-16 (7-12) | 17 – Perry | 7 – Perry | 4 – Perry | Moby Arena (2,188); Fort Collins, CO |
| March 3, 2026; 4:00 pm, MWN | | San Diego State | L 57-74 | 13-17 (7-13) | 26 – Perry | 8 – McNabb | 5 – McNabb | Clune Arena (923); Air Force Academy, CO |
Mountain West tournament
| March 7, 2026; 1:00 pm | (9) | vs. (8) Wyoming; First Round | W 60-53 | 14-17 | 18 – Perry | 9 – Adams | 5 – Perry | Thomas & Mack Center; Paradise, NV |
| March 8, 2026; 1:00 pm | (9) | vs. (1) San Diego State; Quarterfinals | W 83-76 | 15-17 | 33 – Perry | 9 – Perry | 6 – Adams | Thomas & Mack Center; Paradise, NV |
| March 9, 2026; 6:00 pm | (9) | vs. (5) Boise State; Semifinals | W 68-66 | 16-17 | 27 – Perry | 7 – Tied | 6 – Tied | Thomas & Mack Center; Paradise, NV |
| March 10, 2026; 7:30 pm | (9) | vs. (3) Colorado State; Championship | L 42-56 | 16-18 | 14 – Perry | 9 – Cortez | 2 – Tied | Thomas & Mack Center; Paradise, NV |
WNIT
| March 19, 2026*; 6:30 pm | | Northern Colorado; First Round | L 72-79 | 16-19 | 15 – O'Hollaren | 7 – Cortez | 5 – McNabb | Clune Arena (719); Air Force Academy, Colorado |
*Non-conference game. ^{#}Rankings from AP Poll. (#) Tournament seedings in parentheses. All times are in Mountain.
