= 2025–26 UNLV Lady Rebels basketball team =

American college basketball season

2025–26 UNLV Lady Rebels basketball
- Conference: Mountain West Conference
- Record: 21-11 (15-5 MW)
- Head coach: Lindy La Rocque (6th season)
- Associate head coach: Roman Owen
- Assistant coaches: Mia Bell; Joslyn Tinkle
- Home arena: The Pavilion

2025–26 Mountain West Conference women's basketball standings
	Conf.				Overall
Team	W		L	PCT	W		L	PCT
San Diego State	19	–	1	.950	27	–	6	.818
UNLV	15	–	5	.750	21	–	11	.656
Colorado State †	15	–	5	.750	27	–	8	.771
New Mexico	14	–	6	.700	22	–	10	.688
Boise State	14	–	6	.700	25	–	9	.735
Grand Canyon	11	–	9	.550	13	–	19	.406
Fresno State	8	–	12	.400	15	–	18	.455
Wyoming	7	–	13	.350	10	–	20	.333
Air Force	7	–	13	.350	16	–	19	.457
Nevada	6	–	14	.300	10	–	21	.323
Utah State	2	–	18	.100	6	–	24	.200
San Jose State	2	–	18	.100	4	–	28	.125
† 2026 Mountain West tournament winner

The 2025–26 UNLV Lady Rebels basketball team represents the University of Nevada, Las Vegas during the 2025–26 NCAA Division I women's basketball season. The Lady Rebels, led by sixth-year head coach Lindy La Rocque, play their home games at the The Pavilion, attached to the Thomas & Mack Center, in Paradise, Nevada as members of the Mountain West Conference.

== Previous season ==
The Lady Rebels finished the 2024–25 season 26–8, 16–2 in Mountain West play, to finish as Mountain West regular season champions. They defeated Boise State, before being upset by eventual tournament champions San Diego State in the semifinals of the Mountain West tournament. They received an automatic bid to the WBIT, where they would defeat Hawai'i in the first round, before falling to Florida in the second round.

== Preseason ==
On October 22, 2025, the Mountain West Conference released their preseason poll. UNLV was picked to repeat as conference champions, with 19 first-place votes.

=== Preseason rankings ===
MW Preseason Poll
Place	Team	Votes
1	UNLV	281 (19)
2	San Diego State	240 (3)
3	Colorado State	236 (1)
4	Boise State	210 (1)
5	New Mexico	207 (2)
6	Wyoming	194
7	Grand Canyon	177 (1)
8	Air Force	132
9	Fresno State	95
10	Nevada	92
11	Utah State	54
12	San Jose State	44
(#) first-place votes

=== Preseason All-MW Team ===
Preseason All-MW Team
Position	Player	Year
Guard	Aaliyah Alexander	Graduate Student
Forward	Meadow Roland	Sophomore

== Roster ==
2025–26 UNLV Lady Rebels women's basketball team
Players
Coaches

Pos.	#	Name	Height	Year	Previous school	Hometown
G	0	Teagan Colvin	5 ft 7 in (1.7 m)	So	Coeur d'Alene High School	Coeur d'Alene, Idaho
G	1	Sydni Summers	5 ft 5 in (1.65 m)	Jr	San Jose State	Inglewood, California
G	2	Mariah Elohim	5 ft 10 in (1.78 m)	Sr	Fresno State	Westlake, California
F	3	Shelbee Brown	6 ft 0 in (1.83 m)	GS	Akron	Memphis, Tennessee
F	5	Destiny Brown	6 ft 4 in (1.93 m)	Sr	Alcorn State	Los Angeles, California
G	6	Hodaya Kabada	5 ft 10 in (1.78 m)	Fr	Hapoel Lev Jerusalem	Holon, Israel
G	7	Destiny Leo	5 ft 10 in (1.78 m)	GS	Cleveland State	Willowick, Ohio
G	10	Jasmyn Lott	5 ft 8 in (1.73 m)	RS Sr	Frisco Memorial High School	Frisco, Texas
C	11	Alexis Swillis	6 ft 3 in (1.91 m)	Fr	Clovis West High School	Fresno, California
F	12	Ongolea Afu	5 ft 10 in (1.78 m)	Jr	Murray State College	Sandy, Utah
F	21	Trystan James	5 ft 10 in (1.78 m)	Fr	Duncanville High School	Monroe, Louisiana
G	25	Aaliyah Alexander	5 ft 8 in (1.73 m)	GS	Eastern Washington	Federal Way, Washington
C	31	Erica Collins	6 ft 3 in (1.91 m)	Sr	Chino Hills High School	Chino Hills, California
F	32	Meadow Roland	6 ft 2 in (1.88 m)	RS So	San Joaquin Memorial High School	Fresno, California

Head coach

- Lindy La Rocque (Stanford)

Assistant coach(es)

- Roman Owen (Southwestern Christian)
- Mia Bell (UNLV)
- Joslyn Tinkle (Stanford)

Legend

- (C) Team captain
- (S) Suspended
- (I) Ineligible
- (W) Walk-on
- Injured
- Current redshirt

Roster
Last update: January 15, 2026

== Schedule and results ==
Date time, TV	Rank^{#}	Opponent^{#}	Result	Record	High points	High rebounds	High assists	Site (attendance) city, state
Exhibition
October 29, 2025*; 6:30 pm		Southern Nazarene	W 78–41	–	15 – Roland	16 – D. Brown	6 – Colvin	Cox Pavilion (333); Paradise, NV
Non-conference regular season
November 5, 2025*; 6:30 pm, MWN/SSSEN		Washington State	W 64–51	1–0	18 – Alexander	9 – Roland	3 – Tied	Cox Pavilion (1,256); Paradise, NV
November 9, 2025*; 2:00 pm, MWN/SSSEN		DePaul	W 85–78	2–0	18 – Tied	15 – Roland	3 – Alexander	Cox Pavilion (952); Paradise, NV
November 14, 2025*; 6:00 pm, CBSSN		No. 7 Baylor	L 54–62	2–1	18 – Lott	11 – Roland	4 – Roland	Cox Pavilion (2,464); Paradise, NV
November 18, 2025*; 6:00 pm, ESPN+		at Montana State	L 81–94	2–2	18 – Alexander	12 – S. Brown	3 – Tied	Worthington Arena (1,777); Bozeman, MT
November 22, 2025*; 1:00 pm, ESPN+		at Arizona State	L 53−56	2−3	12 – Tied	11 – Roland	4 – S. Brown	Desert Financial Arena (2,728); Tempe, AZ
November 26, 2025*; 12:00 pm, MWN		Creighton; UNLV Thanksgiving Turkey Tip-Off	W 76−67	3−3	25 – Roland	12 – Roland	5 – Colvin	Thomas & Mack Center; Paradise, NV
November 28, 2025*; 2:30 pm, MWN		Northern Iowa; UNLV Thanksgiving Turkey Tip-Off	W 62–56	4–3	17 – Roland	10 – S. Brown	6 – Alexander	Thomas & Mack Center (576); Paradise, NV
December 3, 2025*; 4:30 pm, ESPN+		at UTSA	W 66–39	5–3	21 – Lott	14 – Roland	4 – Roland	Convocation Center (856); San Antonio, TX
December 6, 2025*; 12:00 pm, ESPN+		at Rice	L 50–75	5–4	10 – Lott	8 – Lott	3 – Colvin	Tudor Fieldhouse (703); Houston, TX
December 13, 2025*; 11:00 am, ESPN+		at Cincinnati	L 48–65	5–5	16 – Lott	6 – S. Brown	3 – Leo	Fifth Third Arena (381); Cincinnati, OH
Mountain West regular season
December 17, 2025; 5:00 pm, CBSSN		at Grand Canyon	W 61–60	6–5 (1–0)	20 – Lott	9 – S. Brown	4 – Alexander	Global Credit Union Arena (1,104); Phoenix, AZ
December 20, 2025; 1:00 pm, MWN/SSSEN		New Mexico	W 89−71	7−5 (2–0)	20 – Leo	14 – S. Brown	5 – Tied	Cox Pavilion (536); Paradise, NV
December 31, 2025; 12:00 pm, MWN/SSSEN		Fresno State	W 85–59	8–5 (3–0)	17 – Elohim	9 – S. Brown	5 – Tied	Cox Pavilion (693); Paradise, NV
January 3, 2026; 12:00 pm, MWN		at Air Force	W 64–58	9–5 (4–0)	16 – S. Brown	10 – S. Brown	4 – Tied	Clune Arena (678); Air Force Academy, CO
January 7, 2025; 6:30 pm, MWN/SSSEN		Utah State	W 69–58	10–5 (5–0)	23 – Lott	16 – S. Brown	3 – Tied	Cox Pavilion (499); Paradise, NV
January 10, 2026; 1:00 pm, MWN		at Wyoming	W 82–53	11–5 (6–0)	18 – Roland	14 – S. Brown	5 – Elohim	Arena-Auditorium (1,981); Laramie, WY
January 14, 2026; 7:00 pm, MWN		at San Jose State	W 78–50	12–5 (7–0)	18 – Elohim	13 – S. Brown	4 – Alexander	Provident Credit Union Event Center (347); San Jose, CA
January 17, 2026; 2:00 pm, MWN/SSSEN		San Diego State	L 66−75 ^{OT}	12–6 (7–1)	18 – Alexander	8 – S. Brown	5 – Alexander	Cox Pavilion (883); Paradise, NV
January 21, 2026; 6:30 pm, MWN/SSSEN		Air Force	W 78-47	13-6 (8-1)	20 – Brown	9 – Roland	4 – Alexander	Cox Pavilion (537); Paradise, NV
January 24, 2026; 1:00 pm, MWN		at Nevada	W 62-57	14-6 (9-1)	15 – S. Brown	10 – Roland	2 – Tied	Lawlor Events Center (1,919); Reno, NV
January 28, 2026; 6:00 pm, MWN		at New Mexico	L 57-68	14-7 (9-2)	19 – Lott	5 – Tied	4 – Summers	The Pit (4,366); Albuquerque, NM
January 31, 2026; 12:00 pm, FS1		Colorado State	W 64-51	15-7 (10-2)	14 – Roland	14 – Tied	5 – Alexander	Cox Pavilion (1,103); Paradise, NV
February 7, 2026; 12:00 pm, MWN		at Utah State	W 71-60	16-7 (11-2)	21 – S. Brown	21 – S. Brown	4 – Alexander	Smith Spectrum (714); Logan, UT
February 11, 2026; 6:30 pm, MWN/SSSEN		Wyoming	L 72-82	16-8 (11-3)	30 – Roland	12 – Roland	8 – Alexander	Cox Pavilion (862); Paradise, NV
February 14, 2026; 2:00 pm, MWN/SSSEN		Grand Canyon	W 74-65	17-8 (12-3)	27 – Roland	15 – Roland	6 – Alexander	Cox Pavilion (961); Paradise, NV
February 18, 2026; 6:00 pm, MWN		at San Diego State	L 62-80	17-9 (12-4)	18 – Tied	15 – Roland	2 – Tied	Viejas Arena (2,135); San Diego, CA
February 21, 2026; 2:00 pm, MWN/SSSEN		Nevada	W 81-64	18-9 (13-4)	22 – Roland	8 – S. Brown	6 – Roland	Cox Pavilion (1,235); Paradise, NV
February 25, 2026; 5:30 pm, MWN		at Colorado State	L 61-77	18-10 (13-5)	18 – Alexander	12 – Roland	3 – Roland	Moby Arena (1,432); Fort Collins, CO
February 28, 2026; 2:00 pm, MWN		at Fresno State	W 68-54	19-10 (14-5)	21 – Alexander	12 – Tied	4 – Elohim	Save Mart Center (1,374); Fresno, CA
March 4, 2026; 6:30 pm, MWN/SSSEN		Boise State	W 76-47	20-10 (15-5)	22 – S. Brown	16 – S. Brown	3 – Tied	Cox Pavilion (636); Paradise, NV
Mountain West tournament
March 8, 2026; 5:00 pm, MW Network	(2)	vs. (7) Fresno State; Quarterfinals	W 79-65	21-10	19 – Roland	9 – Roland	4 – Tied	Thomas & Mack Center; Paradise, NV
March 9, 2026; 7:30 pm, MW Network	(2)	vs. (3) Colorado State; Semifinals	L 59-66	21-11	22 – Alexander	12 – S. Brown	3 – Tied	Thomas & Mack Center (909); Paradise, NV
*Non-conference game. ^{#}Rankings from AP Poll. (#) Tournament seedings in parentheses. All times are in Pacific.
