= 2025–26 Utah State Aggies women's basketball team =

American college basketball season

2025–26 Utah State Aggies women's basketball
- Conference: Mountain West Conference
- Record: 6–24 (2–18 MW)
- Head coach: Wesley Brooks (2nd season)
- Associate head coach: Anna Kjaerholt
- Assistant coaches: Quim Gomez; Jasmine Hotchkins-Parker; Kailie Quinn
- Home arena: Smith Spectrum

2025–26 Mountain West Conference women's basketball standings
	Conf.				Overall
Team	W		L	PCT	W		L	PCT
San Diego State	19	–	1	.950	26	–	5	.839
UNLV	15	–	5	.750	21	–	11	.656
Colorado State †	15	–	5	.750	27	–	8	.771
New Mexico	14	–	6	.700	22	–	10	.688
Boise State	14	–	6	.700	25	–	9	.735
Grand Canyon	11	–	9	.550	13	–	19	.406
Fresno State	8	–	12	.400	15	–	18	.455
Wyoming	7	–	13	.350	10	–	20	.333
Air Force	7	–	13	.350	16	–	19	.457
Nevada	6	–	14	.300	10	–	21	.323
Utah State	2	–	18	.100	6	–	24	.200
San Jose State	2	–	18	.100	4	–	28	.125
† 2026 Mountain West tournament winner As of March 20, 2026

The 2025–26 Utah State Aggies women's basketball team represents Utah State University during the 2025–26 NCAA Division I women's basketball season. The Aggies, led by second-year head coach Wesley Brooks, play their home games at the Smith Spectrum in Logan, Utah, as members of the Mountain West Conference.

This season will mark Utah State's last season as members of the Mountain West Conference, as they will be joining the newly reformed Pac-12 Conference, effective July 1, 2026.

== Previous season ==
The Aggies finished the 2024–25 season 4–27, 3–15 in Mountain West play, to finish in a tie for tenth (last) place. They were defeated by Air Force in the quarterfinals of the Mountain West tournament.

== Preseason ==
On October 22, 2025, the Mountain West Conference released their preseason poll. Utah State was picked to finish eleventh in the conference.

=== Preseason rankings ===
MW Preseason Poll
Place	Team	Votes
1	UNLV	281 (19)
2	San Diego State	240 (3)
3	Colorado State	236 (1)
4	Boise State	210 (1)
5	New Mexico	207 (2)
6	Wyoming	194
7	Grand Canyon	177 (1)
8	Air Force	132
9	Fresno State	95
10	Nevada	92
11	Utah State	54
12	San Jose State	44
(#) first-place votes

=== Preseason All-MW Team ===
No players were named to the Preseason All-MW Team.

== Roster ==
2025–26 Utah State Aggies women's basketball team
Players
Coaches

Pos.	#	Name	Height	Year	Previous school	Hometown
F	0	Rachel Wilson	6 ft 2 in (1.88 m)	Sr	Wheeling	Carrollton, Georgia
G	1	Marina Asensio	5 ft 8 in (1.73 m)	Sr	Western Michigan	Sabadell, Spain
F	2	Saskia Kruger	6 ft 1 in (1.85 m)	So	ASC Theresianum Mainz	Lusaka, Zambia
G	3	Aaliyah Gayles	5 ft 9 in (1.75 m)	Jr	USC	Las Vegas, Nevada
G	8	Aitana Rosello Lopez	5 ft 9 in (1.75 m)	Fr	Valencia Basket	Castellón de la Plana, Spain
G	9	Paloma Munoz Herreros	6 ft 1 in (1.85 m)	Fr	Baloncesto Málaga	Málaga, Spain
G	12	Bella Cosme	5 ft 5 in (1.65 m)	Fr	Rancho Christian School	Eastvale, California
F	13	Andjela Marojevic	5 ft 10 in (1.78 m)	So	ŽKK Partizan	Vrbas, Serbia
G	15	Karyn Sanford	6 ft 0 in (1.83 m)	Sr	Tarleton State	Bergen, Norway
G	21	Mirembe Twehamye Montanana	5 ft 10 in (1.78 m)	Fr	Valencia Basket	Valencia, Spain
G	23	Elise Livingston	5 ft 9 in (1.75 m)	So	Ridgeline High School	Millville, Utah
F	31	Macie Brown	6 ft 0 in (1.83 m)	So	College of Southern Idaho	Millville, Utah
G/F	32	Jamisyn Heaton	5 ft 10 in (1.78 m)	Sr	College of Southern Idaho	Lehi, Utah
F/C	55	Sophie Sene	6 ft 3 in (1.91 m)	Sr	Rhode Island	Nice, France

Head coach

- Wesley Brooks (West Virginia)

Assistant coach(es)

- Anna Kjaerholt (Kent State)
- Quim Gomez (AUB)
- Jasmine Hotchkins-Parker (Eastern New Mexico)
- Kailie Quinn (Weber State)

Legend

- (C) Team captain
- (S) Suspended
- (I) Ineligible
- (W) Walk-on
- Injured
- Current redshirt

Roster
Last update: January 21, 2026

== Schedule and results ==
Date time, TV	Rank^{#}	Opponent^{#}	Result	Record	High points	High rebounds	High assists	Site (attendance) city, state
Exhibition
October 30, 2025*; 6:00 pm		San Francisco State	W 71–40	–	16 – Gayles	7 – Sene	4 – Sanford	Smith Spectrum (226); Logan, UT
Non-conference regular season
November 7, 2025*; 6:00 pm, MWN		Utah	L 53–90	0–1	12 – Asensio	5 – Tied	3 – Tied	Smith Spectrum (1,146); Logan, UT
November 11, 2025*; 2:30 pm, ESPN+		at Cal State Bakersfield	W 68–65	1–1	18 – Sene	7 – Sene	3 – Tied	Icardo Center (103); Bakersfield, CA
November 15, 2025*; 11:00 am, MWN		Omaha	W 77–69	2–1	16 – Gayles	7 – Wilson	6 – Sanford	Smith Spectrum (1,554); Logan, UT
November 18, 2025*; 12:00 pm, ESPN+		at Oregon State	L 52–71	2–2	9 – Tied	7 – Sene	5 – Asensio	Gill Coliseum (8,613); Corvallis, OR
November 20, 2025*; 11:00 am, MWN		Stanislaus State	W 96−41	3−2	15 – Heaton	11 – Sene	6 – Cosme	Smith Spectrum (3,863); Logan, UT
November 23, 2025*; 3:00 pm, B1G+		at Oregon	L 34−70	3−3	11 – Gayles	8 – Sene	1 – Tied	Matthew Knight Arena (4,645); Eugene, OR
December 5, 2025*; 7:00 pm, ESPN+		at Loyola Marymount	L 58–63	3–4	14 – Asensio	4 – Tied	3 – Asensio	Gersten Pavilion (276); Los Angeles, CA
December 7, 2025*; 3:00 pm, ESPN+		at San Diego	L 66–70	3–5	20 – Gayles	4 – Tied	4 – Gayles	Jenny Craig Pavilion (389); San Diego, CA
December 13, 2025*; 1:00 pm, MWN		Idaho	W 80–73	4–5	18 – Gayles	9 – Gayles	4 – Asensio	Smith Spectrum (442); Logan, UT
Mountain West regular season
December 17, 2025; 6:00 pm, MWN		Air Force	W 65–53	5–5 (1–0)	19 – Gayles	10 – Gayles	4 – Tied	Smith Spectrum (453); Logan, UT
December 20, 2025; 1:00 pm, MWN		at Colorado State	L 46–55	5–6 (1–1)	10 – Asensio	7 – Heaton	3 – Asensio	Moby Arena (1,598); Fort Collins, CO
December 31, 2025; 1:00 pm, MWN		San Jose State	W 74−61	6−6 (2–1)	19 – Tied	13 – Sene	9 – Asensio	Smith Spectrum (673); Logan, UT
January 3, 2026; 2:00 pm, MWN		at Nevada	L 40–58	6–7 (2–2)	20 – Asensio	7 – Sene	2 – Asensio	Lawlor Events Center (2,371); Reno, NV
January 7, 2026; 7:30 pm, MWN		at UNLV	L 58–69	6–8 (2–3)	16 – Asensio	10 – Sene	4 – Livingston	Smith Spectrum (499); Logan, UT
January 10, 2026; 1:00 pm, MWN		San Diego State	L 72–73	6–9 (2–4)	18 – Heaton	9 – Sene	4 – Rosello Lopez	Smith Spectrum (678); Logan, UT
January 14, 2026; 7:30 pm, MWN		at Fresno State	L 56–86	6–10 (2–5)	16 – Livingston	8 – Sene	3 – Sanford	Save Mart Center; Fresno, CA
January 17, 2026; 7:00 pm, MWN		Boise State	L 60–76	6–11 (2–6)	17 – Livingston	5 – Sene	5 – Sanford	Smith Spectrum (833); Logan, UT
January 21, 2026; 6:30 pm, MWN		at Wyoming						Arena-Auditorium; Laramie, WY
January 24, 2026; 1:00 pm, MWN		Wyoming						Smith Spectrum; Logan, UT
January 28, 2026; 11:00 am, MWN		Grand Canyon						Smith Spectrum; Logan, UT
January 31, 2026; 1:00 pm, MWN		at New Mexico						The Pit; Albuquerque, NM
February 4, 2026; 6:30 pm, MWN		at Air Force						Clune Arena; Air Force Academy, CO
February 7, 2026; 1:00 pm, MWN		UNLV						Smith Spectrum; Logan, UT
February 15, 2026; 1:00 pm, MWN		Fresno State						Smith Spectrum; Logan, UT
February 18, 2026; 8:00 pm, MWN		at San Jose State						Provident Credit Union Event Center; San Jose, CA
February 21, 2026; 12:00 pm, MWN		at Grand Canyon						Global Credit Union Arena; Phoenix, AZ
February 25, 2026; 6:00 pm, MWN		New Mexico						Smith Spectrum; Logan, UT
February 28, 2026; 2:00 pm, MWN		at Boise State						ExtraMile Arena; Boise, ID
March 3, 2026; 6:00 pm, MWN		Nevada						Smith Spectrum; Logan, UT
Mountain West tournament
March 7–10, 2026		vs.						Thomas & Mack Center; Paradise, NV
*Non-conference game. ^{#}Rankings from AP Poll. (#) Tournament seedings in parentheses. All times are in Mountain.
