= Ryun Williams =

American college basketball coach (born 1969)

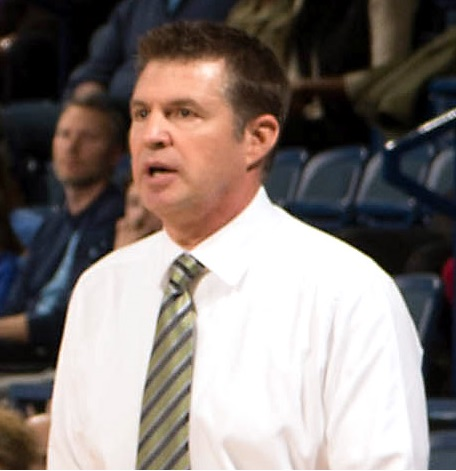
- Williams in 2019

Current position
- Title: Head coach
- Team: Colorado State
- Conference: Pac-12
- Record: 281–157 (.642)

Biographical details
- Born: March 26, 1969 (age 57); Gillette, Wyoming, U.S.

Playing career
- 1988–1990: Sheridan
- 1990–1992: South Dakota
- Position: Guard

Coaching career (HC unless noted)
- 1993–1995: Sheridan (men's asst.)
- 1995–1998: Sheridan
- 1998–2008: Wayne State (NE)
- 2008–2012: South Dakota
- 2012–present: Colorado State

Head coaching record
- Overall: 54–38 (.587) (junior college); 539–309 (.636) (college)
- Tournaments: 0–2 (NCAA Division I); 2–5 (WNIT); 1–1 (WBI); 2–2 (NCAA Division II)

Accomplishments and honors

Championships
- MW Tournament (2016, 2026); 4× MW regular season (2014–2017); NSIC Tournament (2006); NSIC regular season (2006)

Awards
- 2× MW Coach of the Year (2014, 2016); NSIC Coach of the Year (2006); NJCAA Region IX Coach of the Year (1998); 2× Wyoming Conference Coach of the Year (1997, 1998)

Ryun Thomas Williams (born March 26, 1969) is an American college basketball coach who is the current head women's basketball coach at Colorado State.

== Early life and college playing career ==
Born in Gillette, Wyoming, Williams graduated from Campbell County High School and was awarded the Wyoming Mr. Basketball award in 1988.

Williams played junior college basketball at Sheridan College before transferring to the University of South Dakota, where he played two seasons at guard for the South Dakota Coyotes. Williams averaged 17.3 points and 2.3 rebound s in his junior season of 1990–91. As a senior in 1991–92, Williams averaged 9.4 points and 2.4 rebounds.

== Coaching career ==
From 1993 to 1995, Williams was men's basketball assistant coach and women's volleyball head coach at Sheridan. Williams was women's basketball head coach at Sheridan from 1995 to 1998, during which he earned two Wyoming Conference Coach of the Year awards.

Williams moved up to the NCAA Division II ranks as head coach at Wayne State College in Nebraska in 1998. In ten seasons with Wayne State, Williams led the team to two NCAA Tournaments (2006 and 2008) and earned Northern Sun Intercollegiate Conference Coach of the Year honors in 2006 for Wayne State's first NCAA Tournament appearance in history.

In 2008, Williams returned to South Dakota to become women's basketball head coach, for his first Division I coaching position. At the time, South Dakota was moving up from Division II. In Williams's last season as head coach in 2011–12, South Dakota reached a 23–8 record and WNIT appearance, the most success for the program in its Division I era.

Williams became head coach at Colorado State in 2012. Colorado State went 11–19 in his first season and improved to 25–8 in 2013–14, along with a Mountain West Conference regular season title and WNIT appearance. Colorado State won the MW regular season and made the WNIT again in 2014–15. In 2015–16, Colorado State finished first in the MW for the third straight season, this time with an 18–0 conference record. For the first time since the 2001–02 season, Colorado State was ranked in the AP Poll. During his time at CSU, Williams has quickly surged to the winningest women's basketball coach in CSU history, and has registered 20 win seasons in 10 of his seasons at the helm, and a winning record in 11 out of 14 seasons. This includes 5 consecutive 20+ win seasons on two occasions, 4 of which included regular season conference championships, and 2 of which included MW tournament championships.

In 2025-2026, the Rams went 27-7, winning the Mountain West Conference tournament by beating 6th seeded Grand Canyon University, 2nd seeded UNLV, and 9th seeded Air Force, to make their return to the NCAA Tournament. Additionally, with a win over San Jose State on March 3, 2026, Williams tied Joe Legerski for the most conference play wins by a head coach in Mountain West women's basketball history with 159 conference wins; Williams did this in 14 seasons compared with Legerski's 16.

== Head coaching record ==
=== Junior college ===
Record table
Season	Team	Overall	Conference	Standing	Postseason
Sheridan Generals (Wyoming Community College Athletic Conference) (1995–1998)
1995–96	Sheridan	7–21			
1996–97	Sheridan	19–12			
1997–98	Sheridan	28–5			
Sheridan:		54–38 (.587)			
Total:		54–38 (.587)			

=== College ===
Record table
Season	Team	Overall	Conference	Standing	Postseason
Wayne State Wildcats (NCAA Division II independent) (1998–1999)
1998–99	Wayne State (NE)	15–12			
Wayne State Wildcats (Northern Sun Intercollegiate Conference) (1999–2008)
1999–00	Wayne State (NE)	19–9	14–4	4th	
2000–01	Wayne State (NE)	18–9	12–6	4th	
2001–02	Wayne State (NE)	12–15	9–9	7th	
2002–03	Wayne State (NE)	17–11	11–7	5th	
2002–03	Wayne State (NE)	17–11	11–7	5th	
2003–04	Wayne State (NE)	13–15	6–10	7th	
2004–05	Wayne State (NE)	20–11	7–7	6th	
2005–06	Wayne State (NE)	27–4	13–1	1st	NCAA Division II First Round
2006–07	Wayne State (NE)	19–10	11–7	4th	
2007–08	Wayne State (NE)	22–10	12–6	2nd	NCAA Division II Sweet 16
Wayne State (NE):		182–105 (.634)	95–57 (.625)		
South Dakota Coyotes (NCAA Division I independent) (2008–2009)
2008–09	South Dakota	18–11			
South Dakota Coyotes (Summit League) (2009–2012)
2009–10	South Dakota	15–16	6–6	4th	
2010–11	South Dakota	20–12	10–2	2nd	WBI Second Round
2011–12	South Dakota	23–8	12–6	3rd	WNIT Second Round
South Dakota:		76–47 (.618)	28–14 (.667)		
Colorado State Rams (Mountain West Conference) (2012–2026)
2012–13	Colorado State	11–19	7–9	6th	
2013–14	Colorado State	25–8	15–3	1st	WNIT First Round
2014–15	Colorado State	23–8	15–3	1st	WNIT First Round
2015–16	Colorado State	31–2	18–0	1st	NCAA Division I First Round
2016–17	Colorado State	25–9	15–3	1st	WNIT Second Round
2017–18	Colorado State	21–12	11–7	T–4th	WNIT Second Round
2018–19	Colorado State	8–22	2–16	11th	
2019–20	Colorado State	12–18	6–12	T–9th	
2020–21	Colorado State	15–6	11–5	3rd	
2021–22	Colorado State	21–12	9–9	6th	WNIT First Round
2022–23	Colorado State	20–12	12–6	T–3rd	WNIT First Round
2023–24	Colorado State	20–11	10–8	T–4th	
2024–25	Colorado State	22–10	13–5	3rd	
2025–26	Colorado State	27–8	15–5	T-2nd	NCAA Division I First Round
Colorado State:		281–157 (.642)	159–91 (.636)		
Total:		539–309 (.636)			
National champion Postseason invitational champion Conference regular season champion Conference regular season and conference tournament champion Division regular season champion Division regular season and conference tournament champion Conference tournament champion
