= 2025–26 Wyoming Cowgirls basketball team =

American college basketball season

2025–26 Wyoming Cowgirls basketball
- Conference: Mountain West Conference
- Record: 10–20 (7-13 MW)
- Head coach: Heather Ezell (4th season)
- Assistant coaches: Candace Thornton; Fallon Lewis; Natalie Baker; Taylor Ignoto; Monica Brooks
- Home arena: Arena-Auditorium

2025–26 Mountain West Conference women's basketball standings
	Conf.				Overall
Team	W		L	PCT	W		L	PCT
San Diego State	19	–	1	.950	27	–	6	.818
UNLV	15	–	5	.750	21	–	11	.656
Colorado State †	15	–	5	.750	27	–	8	.771
New Mexico	14	–	6	.700	22	–	10	.688
Boise State	14	–	6	.700	25	–	9	.735
Grand Canyon	11	–	9	.550	13	–	19	.406
Fresno State	8	–	12	.400	15	–	18	.455
Wyoming	7	–	13	.350	10	–	20	.333
Air Force	7	–	13	.350	16	–	19	.457
Nevada	6	–	14	.300	10	–	21	.323
Utah State	2	–	18	.100	6	–	24	.200
San Jose State	2	–	18	.100	4	–	28	.125
† 2026 Mountain West tournament winner

The 2025–26 Wyoming Cowgirls basketball team represents the University of Wyoming during the 2025–26 NCAA Division I women's basketball season. The Cowgirls, led by fourth-year head coach Heather Ezell, play their home games at the Arena-Auditorium in Laramie, Wyoming, as members of the Mountain West Conference.

== Previous season ==
The Cowgirls finished the 2024–25 season 22–12, 14–4 in Mountain West play, to finish in second place. They defeated Air Force, and Fresno State, before falling to San Diego State in the Mountain West tournament championship game. They received an at-large bid to the WBIT, where they would be defeated by Texas Tech in the First Round.

== Preseason ==
On October 22, 2025, the Mountain West Conference released their preseason poll. Wyoming was picked to finish sixth in the conference.

=== Preseason rankings ===
MW Preseason Poll
Place	Team	Votes
1	UNLV	281 (19)
2	San Diego State	240 (3)
3	Colorado State	236 (1)
4	Boise State	210 (1)
5	New Mexico	207 (2)
6	Wyoming	194
7	Grand Canyon	177 (1)
8	Air Force	132
9	Fresno State	95
10	Nevada	92
11	Utah State	54
12	San Jose State	44
(#) first-place votes

=== Preseason All-MW Team ===
Preseason All-MW Team
Position	Player	Year
Guard	Malene Pedersen	Senior

== Roster ==
2025–26 Wyoming Cowgirls women's basketball team
Players
Coaches

Pos.	#	Name	Height	Year	Previous school	Hometown
F	1	Logann Alvar	6 ft 0 in (1.83 m)	Sr	Casper College	Casper, Wyoming
F	2	Jane Rumpf	6 ft 2 in (1.88 m)	Fr	Regis Jesuit High School	Denver, Colorado
G	3	Payton Muma	5 ft 8 in (1.73 m)	RS Jr	Gonzaga	Highlands Ranch, Colorado
F/C	5	Liv Blomkvist	6 ft 4 in (1.93 m)	Fr	RIG Luleå	Stockholm, Sweden
G	6	Aurore Eyango	5 ft 9 in (1.75 m)	Sr	St. Bonaventure	Lille, France
G	10	Lana Beslic	5 ft 8 in (1.73 m)	So	Western Reserve Academy	Split, Croatia
F	11	Madi Symons	6 ft 0 in (1.83 m)	Jr	Coeur d'Alene High School	Coeur d'Alene, Idaho
G	12	Malene Pedersen	5 ft 11 in (1.8 m)	Sr	Kansas State	Aabyhøj, Denmark
G/F	13	Karoline Lundin	5 ft 11 in (1.8 m)	So	Marbo Basket	Copenhagen, Denmark
G	14	Kati Ollilainen	5 ft 9 in (1.75 m)	Jr	HBA-Märsky	Helsinki, Finland
F/C	15	Heidur Karlsdottir	6 ft 4 in (1.93 m)	So	Fjölnir	Reykholt, Iceland
G	21	Katie Harrington	6 ft 0 in (1.83 m)	Fr	ATC Academy	Melbourne, Australia
F	22	Peyton Wohlford	6 ft 2 in (1.88 m)	Fr	Smithville High School	Smithville, Missouri
G	25	Mikyn Hamlin	5 ft 8 in (1.73 m)	Jr	Hugoton High School	Hugoton, Kansas
G	26	Henna Sandvik	6 ft 0 in (1.83 m)	Sr	Indiana	Helsinki, Finland

Head coach

- Heather Ezell (Iowa State)

Assistant coach(es)

- Candace Thornton (Colorado–Colorado Springs)
- Fallon Lewis (Wyoming)
- Natalie Baker (Wyoming)
- Taylor Ignoto (Washburn)
- Monica Brooks (Colorado Mesa)

Legend

- (C) Team captain
- (S) Suspended
- (I) Ineligible
- (W) Walk-on
- Injured
- Current redshirt

Roster
Last update: January 22, 2026

== Schedule and results ==
Date time, TV	Rank^{#}	Opponent^{#}	Result	Record	High points	High rebounds	High assists	Site (attendance) city, state
Exhibition
October 24, 2025*; 6:30 pm		Fort Lewis	W 54–51	–	–	–	–	Arena-Auditorium; Laramie, WY
October 31, 2025*; 6:30 pm		Colorado Christian	W 62–45	–	–	–	–	Arena-Auditorium; Laramie, WY
Non-conference regular season
November 4, 2025*; 6:30 pm, MWN		Saint Mary's	L 47–56	0–1	14 – Pedersen	6 – Sandvik	2 – Tied	Arena-Auditorium (1,970); Laramie, WY
November 7, 2025*; 6:30 pm, MWN		Long Beach State	W 72–39	1–1	15 – Pedersen	8 – Pedersen	7 – Pedersen	Arena-Auditorium (1,974); Laramie, WY
November 11, 2025*; 5:30 pm, ESPN+		at UT Arlington	L 44–64	1–2	11 – Pedersen	7 – Symons	4 – Symons	College Park Center (695); Arlington, TX
November 14, 2025*; 7:00 pm, ESPN+		at Santa Clara	L 45–76	1–3	16 – Pedersen	8 – Beslic	5 – Muma	Leavey Center (415); Santa Clara, CA
November 21, 2025*; 11:00 am, SLN/Midco Sports+		at North Dakota	L 45−65	1−4	19 – Pedersen	6 – Sandvik	2 – Tied	Betty Engelstad Sioux Center (2,575); Grand Forks, ND
November 25, 2025*; 11:00 am, MWN		Chadron State	W 75−38	2−4	26 – Pedersen	7 – Beslic	6 – Beslic	Arena-Auditorium (5,179); Laramie, WY
November 29, 2025*; 1:00 pm, MWN		South Dakota	W 66–59	3–4	25 – Pedersen	6 – Symons	6 – Symons	Arena-Auditorium (2,080); Laramie, WY
December 7, 2025*; 1:00 pm, ESPN+		at Colorado	L 46–58	3–5	11 – Tied	5 – Tied	4 – Symons	CU Events Center (2,394); Boulder, CO
December 14, 2025*; 4:00 pm, B1G+		at Minnesota	L 34–80	3–6	10 – Pedersen	4 – Sandvik	3 – Sandvik	Williams Arena (3,266); Minneapolis, MN
Mountain West regular season
December 17, 2025; 6:30 pm, MWN		San Jose State	W 83–60	4–6 (1–0)	21 – Tied	7 – Tied	6 – Muma	Arena-Auditorium (2,369); Laramie, WY
December 20, 2025; 3:00 pm, MWN		at Fresno State	L 36–53	4–7 (1–1)	17 – Pedersen	3 – Tied	3 – Muma	Save Mart Center (1,210); Fresno, CA
December 31, 2025; 1:00 pm, MWN		at New Mexico	L 48−62	4−8 (1–2)	22 – Pedersen	10 – Karlsdottir	4 – Beslic	The Pit (4,844); Albuquerque, NM
January 3, 2026; 2:00 pm, MWN		San Diego State	L 55–72	4–9 (1–3)	17 – Tied	6 – Pedersen	6 – Beslic	Arena-Auditorium (2,713); Laramie, WY
January 7, 2026; 7:30 pm, MWN		at Nevada	L 60–70 ^{OT}	4–10 (1–4)	18 – Sandvik	6 – Tied	3 – Tied	Lawlor Events Center (1,344); Reno, NV
January 10, 2026; 2:00 pm, MWN		UNLV	L 53–82	4–11 (1–5)	16 – Tied	10 – Rumpf	5 – Muma	Arena-Auditorium (1,981); Laramie, WY
January 14, 2026; 6:30 pm, MWN		at Boise State	L 40–77	4–12 (1–6)	14 – Pedersen	7 – Karlsdottir	3 – Karlsdottir	ExtraMile Arena (1,861); Boise, ID
January 17, 2026; 2:00 pm, MWN		Air Force	W 67–44	5–12 (2–6)	24 – Pedersen	12 – Rumpf	5 – Sandvik	Arena-Auditorium (1,915); Laramie, WY
January 21, 2026; 6:30 pm, MWN		at Utah State	W 63–51	6–12 (3–6)	14 – Sandvik	8 – Rumpf	4 – Rumpf	Smith Spectrum (1,872); Logan, UT
January 24, 2026; 1:00 pm, ESPN+		Utah State	W 74-56	7-12 (4-6)	–	–	–	Jenny Craig Pavilion; San Diego, CA
January 28, 2026; 6:30 pm, MWN		Fresno State	W 47-42	8-12 (5-6)	–	–	–	Arena-Auditorium; Laramie, WY
January 31, 2026; 1:00 pm, MWN		at Grand Canyon	L 47-57	8-13 (5-7)	–	–	–	Global Credit Union Arena; Phoenix, AZ
February 4, 2026; 6:30 pm, MWN		New Mexico	L 51-58	8-14 (5-8)	–	–	–	Arena-Auditorium; Laramie, WY
February 7, 2026; 2:00 pm, MWN		at Colorado State; Border War	L 53-84	8-15 (5-9)	–	–	–	Moby Arena; Fort Collins, CO
February 11, 2026; 7:30 pm, MWN		at UNLV	W 82-72	9-15 (6-9)	–	–	–	Cox Pavilion; Paradise, NV
February 14, 2026; 2:00 pm, MWN		Boise State	L 54-56	9-16 (6-10)	–	–	–	Arena-Auditorium; Laramie, WY
February 21, 2026; 2:00 pm, MWN		Colorado State; Border War	L 48-62	9-17 (6-11)	–	–	–	Arena-Auditorium; Laramie, WY
February 25, 2026; 11:00 am, MWN		at Air Force	L 61-69	9-18 (6-12)	–	–	–	Clune Arena; Air Force Academy, CO
February 28, 2026; 2:00 pm, MWN		at San Diego State	L 51-70	9-19 (6-13)	–	–	–	Viejas Arena; San Diego, CA
March 3, 2026; 5:00 pm, MWN		Grand Canyon	W 59-57	10-19 (7-13)	–	–	–	Arena-Auditorium; Laramie, WY
Mountain West tournament
March 7–10, 2026	(8)	vs. (9) Air Force	L 53-60	10-20	–	–	–	Thomas & Mack Center; Paradise, NV
*Non-conference game. ^{#}Rankings from AP Poll. (#) Tournament seedings in parentheses. All times are in Mountain.
