= 2025–26 Grand Canyon Antelopes women's basketball team =

American college basketball season

2025–26 Grand Canyon Antelopes women's basketball
- Conference: Mountain West Conference
- Record: 13–19 (11–9 MW)
- Head coach: Winston Gandy (1st season)
- Assistant coaches: Adrian Sanders; Julia Ford; Matt Shewmake; Celeste Taylor; Chloe Rice
- Home arena: Global Credit Union Arena

2025–26 Mountain West Conference women's basketball standings
	Conf.				Overall
Team	W		L	PCT	W		L	PCT
San Diego State	19	–	1	.950	27	–	6	.818
UNLV	15	–	5	.750	21	–	11	.656
Colorado State †	15	–	5	.750	27	–	8	.771
New Mexico	14	–	6	.700	22	–	10	.688
Boise State	14	–	6	.700	25	–	9	.735
Grand Canyon	11	–	9	.550	13	–	19	.406
Fresno State	8	–	12	.400	15	–	18	.455
Wyoming	7	–	13	.350	10	–	20	.333
Air Force	7	–	13	.350	16	–	19	.457
Nevada	6	–	14	.300	10	–	21	.323
Utah State	2	–	18	.100	6	–	24	.200
San Jose State	2	–	18	.100	4	–	28	.125
† 2026 Mountain West tournament winner

The 2025–26 Grand Canyon Antelopes women's basketball team represents Grand Canyon University during the 2025–26 NCAA Division I women's basketball season. The Antelopes, led by first-year head coach Winston Gandy, play their home games at Global Credit Union Arena in Phoenix, Arizona as first-year members of the Mountain West Conference.

== Previous season ==
The Antelopes finished the 2024–25 season 32–3, 16–0 in WAC play, to finish as WAC regular season champions. They defeated Utah Tech, Utah Valley, and UT Arlington to win the WAC tournament, sending Grand Canyon to their first ever NCAA tournament appearance. In the tournament, they would receive the No. 13 seed in the Spokane Regional 1, where they would be defeated by No. 4 seed Baylor in the First Round.

On March 21, 2025, it was announced that head coach Molly Miller would be leaving the program, after five seasons, in order to take the head coaching position at Arizona State. Just three days later, on March 24, the school announced that they would be hiring South Carolina assistant coach Winston Gandy as Miller's successor.

== Preseason ==
On October 22, 2025, the Mountain West Conference released their preseason poll. Grand Canyon was picked to finish seventh in the conference, with one first-place vote.

=== Preseason rankings ===
MW Preseason Poll
Place	Team	Votes
1	UNLV	281 (19)
2	San Diego State	240 (3)
3	Colorado State	236 (1)
4	Boise State	210 (1)
5	New Mexico	207 (2)
6	Wyoming	194
7	Grand Canyon	177 (1)
8	Air Force	132
9	Fresno State	95
10	Nevada	92
11	Utah State	54
12	San Jose State	44
(#) first-place votes

=== Preseason All-MW Team ===
Preseason All-MW Team
Position	Player	Year
Guard	Chloe Mann	Sophomore

== Roster ==
2025–26 Grand Canyon Antelopes women's basketball team
Players
Coaches

Pos.	#	Name	Height	Year	Previous school	Hometown
G	0	Chloe Mann	5 ft 8 in (1.73 m)	So	Cincinnati	Fort Worth, Texas
F	1	Anisa Jeffries	5 ft 11 in (1.8 m)	Sr	Borregos	Zacatecas, Mexico
G	3	Ale'jah Douglas	5 ft 6 in (1.68 m)	GS	Oklahoma State	North Omaha, Nebraska
G	4	Diamond Wright	5 ft 10 in (1.78 m)	Fr	Willamette High School	Springfield, Oregon
G	6	Casey Valenti-Paea	5 ft 9 in (1.75 m)	GS	Virginia	Melbourne, Australia
G	7	Karley Johnson	5 ft 9 in (1.75 m)	Sr	Arkansas	Oklahoma City, Oklahoma
G	8	Sifa Ineza	5 ft 11 in (1.8 m)	RS Jr	Middle Tennessee	Musanze, Rwanda
F	10	Sophia Fontaine	6 ft 2 in (1.88 m)	RS So	Stetson	Chelsea, Massachusetts
F	11	Holly Griffiths	6 ft 1 in (1.85 m)	Jr	Fresno State	Melbourne, Australia
F	15	Favor Ayodele	6 ft 1 in (1.85 m)	GS	Tennessee	Móstoles, Spain
G	20	Julianna LaMendola	6 ft 1 in (1.85 m)	Jr	Indiana	Coppell, Texas
G	21	Sidney Anderson	5 ft 9 in (1.75 m)	Fr	Salpointe Catholic High School	Tucson, Arizona
G	22	Kaitlyn Elsholz	5 ft 11 in (1.8 m)	Jr	Cal State Northridge	Peoria, Arizona
F	24	Norah Moo	6 ft 2 in (1.88 m)	Fr	Pinnacle High School	Wheaton, Illinois
G	33	Ines Zounia	5 ft 10 in (1.78 m)	Fr	Lycée Voltaire	Lille, France
F	54	Faith Carson	6 ft 4 in (1.93 m)	RS So	Ohio State	Buchanan, Michigan

Head coach

- Winston Gandy (Maryland)

Assistant coach(es)

- Adrian Sanders (Southern)
- Julia Ford (Bentley)
- Matt Shewmake (Alabama)
- Celeste Taylor (Ohio State)
- Chloe Rice (Bradley)

Legend

- (C) Team captain
- (S) Suspended
- (I) Ineligible
- (W) Walk-on
- Injured
- Current redshirt

Roster
Last update: January 18, 2026

== Schedule and results ==
Date time, TV	Rank^{#}	Opponent^{#}	Result	Record	High points	High rebounds	High assists	Site (attendance) city, state
Non-conference regular season
November 3, 2025*; 5:00 pm, SECN+		at No. 2 South Carolina	L 54–94	0–1	16 – Douglas	5 – Jeffries	2 – Tied	Colonial Life Arena (15,601); Columbia, SC
November 8, 2025*; 6:00 pm, AZFS/MWN		Idaho State	L 55–67	0–2	21 – Mann	6 – LaMendola	3 – Tied	Global Credit Union Arena (3,021); Phoenix, AZ
November 11, 2025*; 7:00 pm, B1G+		at Oregon	L 66–84	0–3	14 – Douglas	4 – Tied	3 – Valenti-Paea	Matthew Knight Arena (5,177); Eugene, OR
November 15, 2025*; 3:00 pm, ESPN+		at UC Santa Barbara	L 70–72	0–4	17 – LaMendola	7 – Tied	5 – Mann	The Thunderdome (481); Santa Barbara, CA
November 18, 2025*; 6:00 pm, AZFS/MWN		SMU	W 76−60	1−4	16 – Douglas	11 – Moo	3 – Johnson	Global Credit Union Arena (812); Phoenix, AZ
November 24, 2025*; 6:00 pm, FloCollege		vs. California; Hoopfest Basketball Women's Challenge	L 63−68	1−5	17 – Jeffries	7 – LaMendola	3 – Jeffries	Comerica Center (271); Frisco, TX
November 26, 2025*; 3:00 pm, FloCollege		vs. UTSA; Hoopfest Basketball Women's Challenge	L 64–65	1–6	21 – LaMendola	6 – Tied	6 – Douglas	Comerica Center (184); Frisco, TX
December 4, 2025*; 7:00 pm, ESPN+		at Gonzaga	L 58–62	1–7	26 – Mann	6 – Johnson	3 – Mann	McCarthey Athletic Center (4,588); Spokane, WA
December 7, 2025*; 1:00 pm, 3TV/MWN		Saint Mary's	L 54–62	1–8	17 – Mann	8 – LaMendola	5 – Douglas	Global Credit Union Arena (487); Phoenix, AZ
December 14, 2025*; 1:00 pm, 3TV/MWN		Santa Clara	L 72–91	1–9	29 – Mann	5 – Tied	5 – LaMendola	Global Credit Union Arena (602); Phoenix, AZ
Mountain West regular season
December 17, 2025; 6:00 pm, CBSSN		UNLV	L 60–61	1–10 (0–1)	12 – Jeffries	10 – LaMendola	5 – LaMendola	Global Credit Union Arena (1,104); Phoenix, AZ
December 28, 2025; 3:00 pm, MWN		at San Jose State	W 79−59	2−10 (1–1)	25 – LaMendola	10 – LaMendola	5 – Mann	Provident Credit Union Event Center (306); San Jose, CA
December 31, 2025; 11:00 am, AZFS/MWN		Colorado State	L 47–61	2–11 (1–2)	10 – Tied	7 – LaMendola	2 – Tied	Global Credit Union Arena (625); Phoenix, AZ
January 3, 2026; 2:00 pm, MWN		at Boise State	W 87–76	3–11 (2–2)	17 – Mann	14 – Jeffries	4 – Jeffries	ExtraMile Arena (1,911); Boise, ID
January 7, 2026; 7:00 pm, MWN		at San Diego State	L 69–87	3–12 (2–3)	13 – Mann	7 – Jeffries	6 – LaMendola	Viejas Arena (1,161); San Diego, CA
January 10, 2026; 1:00 pm, 3TV/MWN		Fresno State	W 71–64	4–12 (3–3)	14 – Jeffries	6 – LaMendola	7 – Mann	Global Credit Union Arena (685); Phoenix, AZ
January 14, 2026; 6:00 pm, AZFS/MWN		Nevada	W 65–51	5–12 (4–3)	20 – Douglas	7 – Jeffries	7 – Mann	Global Credit Union Arena (408); Phoenix, AZ
January 17, 2026; 2:30 pm, FS1		at New Mexico	W 75–62	6–12 (5–3)	19 – Mann	14 – LaMendola	4 – LaMendola	The Pit (5,234); Albuquerque, NM
January 21, 2026; 6:30 pm, MWN		at Colorado State	L 50-67	6-13 (5-4)	13 – Zounia	12 – Johnson	6 – Mann	Moby Arena (1,357); Fort Collins, CO
January 24, 2026; 1:00 pm, 3TV/MWN		Boise State	L 65-75	6-14 (5-5)	16 – Douglas	5 – Tied	4 – Tied	Global Credit Union Arena (1,104); Phoenix, AZ
January 28, 2026; 11:00 am, MWN		at Utah State	W 86-66	7-14 (6-5)	16 – Valenti-Paea	8 – Jeffries	4 – Tied	Smith Spectrum (1,338); Logan, UT
January 31, 2026; 1:00 pm, 3TV/MWN		Wyoming	W 57-47	8-14 (7-5)	19 – LaMendola	9 – LaMendola	3 – Tied	Global Credit Union Arena (612); Phoenix, AZ
February 4, 2026; 6:00 pm, AZFS/MWN		San Diego State	W 57-44	9-14 (8-5)	18 – Mann	8 – Tied	4 – Jeffries	Global Credit Union Arena (643); Phoenix, AZ
February 7, 2026; 1:00 pm, MWN		at Air Force	L 64-65	9-15 (8-6)	26 – LaMendola	7 – Tied	4 – Mann	Clune Arena (941); Air Force Academy, CO
February 14, 2026; 3:00 pm, MWN		at UNLV	L 65-74	9-16 (8-7)	15 – LaMendola	7 – Tied	4 – Valenti-Paea	Cox Pavilion (961); Paradise, NV
February 18, 2026; 6:00 pm, AZFS/MWN		New Mexico	L 68-70	9-17 (8-8)	22 – LaMendola	7 – Jeffries	8 – Mann	Global Credit Union Arena (603); Phoenix, AZ
February 21, 2026; 12:00 pm, AZFS/MWN		Utah State	W 63-43	10-17 (9-8)	14 – LaMendola	9 – LaMendola	4 – Tied	Global Credit Union Arena (537); Phoenix, AZ
February 25, 2026; 7:30 pm, MWN		at Fresno State	W 57-42	11-17 (10-8)	15 – Mann	10 – Jeffries	3 – Tied	Save Mart Center (2,127); Fresno, CA
February 28, 2026; 1:00 pm, 3TV/MWN		San Jose State	W 65-52	12-17 (11-8)	18 – Wright	8 – LaMendola	5 – Zounia	Global Credit Union Arena (609); Phoenix, AZ
March 3, 2026; 5:00 pm, MWN		at Wyoming	L 57-59	12-18 (11-9)	20 – Mann	7 – Tied	3 – Douglas	Arena-Auditorium (2,171); Laramie, WY
Mountain West tournament
March 7, 2026; 8:30 pm, MWN	(6)	vs. (11) Utah State; First Round	W 75-58	13-18	15 – LaMendola	13 – LaMendola	3 – Tied	Thomas & Mack Center (870); Las Vegas, NV
March 8, 2026; 7:30 pm, MWN	(6)	vs. (3) Colorado State; Second Round	L 59-61	13-19	13 – LaMendola	11 – Moo	4 – Tied	Thomas & Mack Center (1,545); Las Vegas, NV
*Non-conference game. ^{#}Rankings from AP Poll. (#) Tournament seedings in parentheses. All times are in Mountain.
