= 2025–26 Nevada Wolf Pack women's basketball team =

American college basketball season

2025–26 Nevada Wolf Pack women's basketball
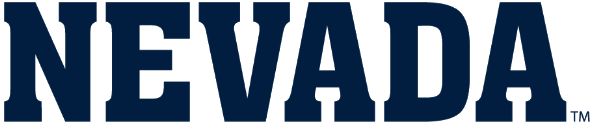
- Conference: Mountain West Conference
- Record: 10–21 (6–14 MW)
- Head coach: Amanda Levens (9th season)
- Assistant coaches: Laura Gonsalves; Ashley Elliott; Halie Bergman; Ula Motuga; Lavaris Duncan
- Home arena: Lawlor Events Center

2025–26 Mountain West Conference women's basketball standings
	Conf.				Overall
Team	W		L	PCT	W		L	PCT
San Diego State	19	–	1	.950	25	–	5	.833
UNLV	15	–	5	.750	21	–	11	.656
Colorado State †	15	–	5	.750	27	–	7	.794
New Mexico	14	–	6	.700	22	–	10	.688
Boise State	14	–	6	.700	25	–	9	.735
Grand Canyon	11	–	9	.550	13	–	19	.406
Fresno State	8	–	12	.400	15	–	18	.455
Wyoming	7	–	13	.350	10	–	20	.333
Air Force	7	–	13	.350	16	–	18	.471
Nevada	6	–	14	.300	10	–	21	.323
Utah State	2	–	18	.100	6	–	24	.200
San Jose State	2	–	18	.100	4	–	28	.125
† 2026 Mountain West tournament winner As of March 10, 2026

The 2025–26 Nevada Wolf Pack women's basketball team represents the University of Nevada, Reno during the 2025–26 NCAA Division I women's basketball season. The Wolf Pack, led by ninth-year head coach Amanda Levens, play their home games at the Lawlor Events Center in Reno, Nevada, as members of the Mountain West Conference.

== Previous season ==
The Wolf Pack finished the 2024–25 season 11–21, 6–12 in Mountain West play, to finish in ninth place. They were defeated by Boise State in the first round of the Mountain West tournament.

== Preseason ==
On October 22, 2025, the Mountain West Conference released their preseason poll. Nevada was picked to finish tenth in the conference.

=== Preseason rankings ===
MW Preseason Poll
Place	Team	Votes
1	UNLV	281 (19)
2	San Diego State	240 (3)
3	Colorado State	236 (1)
4	Boise State	210 (1)
5	New Mexico	207 (2)
6	Wyoming	194
7	Grand Canyon	177 (1)
8	Air Force	132
9	Fresno State	95
10	Nevada	92
11	Utah State	54
12	San Jose State	44
(#) first-place votes

=== Preseason All-MW Team ===
No players were named to the Preseason All-MW Team.

== Roster ==
2025–26 Nevada Wolf Pack women's basketball team
Players
Coaches

Pos.	#	Name	Height	Year	Previous school	Hometown
F	0	Tahj-Monet Bloom	6 ft 2 in (1.88 m)	RS Fr	Mississippi State	Okinawa, Japan
G	1	Ahrray Young	5 ft 11 in (1.8 m)	RS Jr	Tulsa	Sacramento, California
G	2	Izzy Sullivan	5 ft 10 in (1.78 m)	Jr	Eastside Catholic School	Sammamish, Washington
F	3	Imbie Jones	6 ft 2 in (1.88 m)	Jr	Wisconsin	Seattle, Washington
G	4	Gabby Ramos	5 ft 10 in (1.78 m)	Fr	Clovis East High School	Clovis, California
F	8	Olivia Poulivaati	6 ft 0 in (1.83 m)	RS So	Tualatin High School	Tualatin, Oregon
G	9	Hanna Jolinder	6 ft 0 in (1.83 m)	Fr	Alvik Basketball Club	Stockholm, Sweden
F	10	Chloe Williams	6 ft 3 in (1.91 m)	Sr	Indiana State	Los Angeles, California
PG	11	Britain Backus	5 ft 7 in (1.7 m)	Fr	Albert M. Lowry High School	Winnemucca, Nevada
G	12	Cheyenne McEvans	5 ft 9 in (1.75 m)	GS	Florida A&M	Detroit, Michigan
F	13	Amelia Raidaveta	6 ft 2 in (1.88 m)	RS Jr	Weber State	Dubbo, Australia
F	14	Maia Rosarion	5 ft 10 in (1.78 m)	So	Morehead State	Vancouver, British Columbia
F	23	Makayla Carter	6 ft 2 in (1.88 m)	Fr	Mountain View High School	Tucson, Arizona
G	24	Skylar Durley	5 ft 9 in (1.75 m)	Fr	Edmond North High School	Oklahoma City, Oklahoma
F	34	Kendra Hicks	6 ft 1 in (1.85 m)	So	Jesuit High School	Portland, Oregon
G	35	Elle Motherway	5 ft 11 in (1.8 m)	Jr	Bishop Manogue High School	Reno, Nevada

Head coach

- Amanda Levens (Arizona State)

Assistant coach(es)

- Laura Gonsalves (Washington)
- Ashley Elliott (Wyoming)
- Halie Bergman (Nevada)
- Ula Motuga (Washington State)
- Lavaris Duncan (Angelo State)

Legend

- (C) Team captain
- (S) Suspended
- (I) Ineligible
- (W) Walk-on
- Injured
- Current redshirt

Roster
Last update: January 19, 2026

== Schedule and results ==
Date time, TV	Rank^{#}	Opponent^{#}	Result	Record	High points	High rebounds	High assists	Site (attendance) city, state
Non-conference regular season
November 3, 2025*; 6:30 pm, MWN		Cal State San Marcos	W 70–53	1–0	15 – Young	8 – Tied	4 – Tied	Lawlor Events Center (1,432); Reno, NV
November 6, 2025*; 11:00 am, ESPN+		at Sacramento State	L 45–65	1–1	17 – Durley	8 – Carter	1 – Tied	Hornet Pavilion (1,144); Sacramento, CA
November 13, 2025*; 10:30 am, MWN		Loyola Marymount	W 56–52	2–1	15 – Sullivan	6 – Durley	5 – Durley	Lawlor Events Center (4,970); Reno, NV
November 16, 2025*; 2:00 pm, ESPN+		at Saint Mary's	L 50–56	2–2	16 – Young	9 – Carter	5 – Durley	University Credit Union Pavilion (287); Moraga, CA
November 21, 2025*; 6:30 pm, MWN		Alabama A&M	W 57−52	3−2	12 – Williams	6 – Durley	3 – Sullivan	Lawlor Events Center (1,987); Reno, NV
November 24, 2025*; 6:30 pm, MWN		Utah Valley	W 71−42	4−2	20 – Ramos	8 – Carter	3 – Tied	Lawlor Events Center (1,244); Reno, NV
November 28, 2025*; 5:00 pm, ESPN+		vs. Eastern Washington; Portland Tournament	L 57–58	4–3	15 – Williams	12 – Williams	3 – Young	Chiles Center (335); Portland, OR
November 29, 2025*; 3:00 pm, ESPN+		at Portland; Portland Tournament	L 52–65	4–4	20 – Durley	9 – Carter	3 – Young	Chiles Center (547); Portland, OR
December 5, 2025*; 3:00 pm		vs. San Francisco; Briann January Classic	L 45–68	4–5	9 – Williams	7 – Young	3 – Tied	Mullett Arena (142); Tempe, AZ
December 6, 2025*; 11:00 am		vs. McNeese; Briann January Classic	L 42–63	4–6	10 – Young	9 – Rosarion	3 – Tied	Mullett Arena (242); Tempe, AZ
December 13, 2025*; 1:00 pm, MWN		Pacific	Interrupted game due to power outage					Lawlor Events Center; Reno, NV
Mountain West regular season
December 17, 2025; 6:30 pm, NSN/MWN		Colorado State	L 48−61	4−7 (0–1)	13 – Young	7 – Williams	2 – Tied	Lawlor Events Center (1,223); Reno, NV
December 20, 2025; 12:00 pm, MWN		at Air Force	L 45–61	4–8 (0–2)	18 – Durley	10 – Williams	1 – Tied	Clune Arena (368); Air Force Academy, CO
December 31, 2025; 1:00 pm, MWN		at Boise State	L 62–74	4–9 (0–3)	21 – Ramos	7 – Jones	3 – Ramos	ExtraMile Arena (2,023); Boise, ID
January 3, 2026; 1:00 pm, MWN		Utah State	W 58–40	5–9 (1–3)	17 – Sullivan	9 – Durley	2 – Tied	Lawlor Events Center (2,371); Reno, NV
January 7, 2026; 6:30 pm, NSN/MWN		Wyoming	W 70–60 ^{OT}	6–9 (2–3)	18 – Durley	14 – Durley	5 – Sullivan	Lawlor Events Center (1,344); Reno, NV
January 10, 2026; 12:00 pm, MWN		at New Mexico	W 70–61	7–9 (3–3)	20 – Young	6 – Tied	7 – Young	The Pit (4,667); Albuquerque, NM
January 14, 2026; 5:00 pm, MWN		at Grand Canyon	L 51–65	7–10 (3–4)	15 – Sullivan	10 – Durley	1 – Tied	Global Credit Union Arena (408); Phoenix, AZ
January 17, 2026; 1:00 pm, MWN		Fresno State	L 44–54	7–11 (3–5)	10 – Poulivaati	7 – Poulivaati	3 – Durley	Lawlor Events Center (1,421); Reno, NV
January 21, 2026; 7:00 pm, MWN		at San Jose State						Provident Credit Union Event Center; San Jose, CA
January 24, 2026; 1:00 pm, NSN/MWN		UNLV						Lawlor Events Center; Reno, NV
January 31, 2026; 1:00 pm, MWN		at San Diego State						Viejas Arena; San Diego, CA
February 4, 2026; 10:30 am, MWN		Boise State						Lawlor Events Center; Reno, NV
February 7, 2026; 3:00 pm, MWN		at Fresno State						Save Mart Center; Fresno, CA
February 11, 2026; 6:30 pm, NSN/MWN		Air Force						Lawlor Events Center; Reno, NV
February 14, 2026; 1:00 pm, NSN/MWN		San Diego State						Lawlor Events Center; Reno, NV
February 18, 2026; 5:30 pm, MWN		at Colorado State						Moby Arena; Fort Collins, CO
February 21, 2026; 2:00 pm, MWN		at UNLV						Cox Pavilion; Paradise, NV
February 25, 2026; 6:30 pm, MWN		San Jose State						Lawlor Events Center; Reno, NV
February 28, 2026; 1:00 pm, NSN/MWN		New Mexico						Lawlor Events Center; Reno, NV
March 3, 2026; 5:00 pm, MWN		at Utah State						Smith Spectrum; Logan, UT
Mountain West tournament
March 7–10, 2026		vs.						Thomas & Mack Center; Paradise, NV
*Non-conference game. ^{#}Rankings from AP Poll. (#) Tournament seedings in parentheses. All times are in Pacific.
