= 2025–26 Colorado State Rams women's basketball team =

American college basketball season

2025–26 Colorado State Rams women's basketball

Mountain West tournament champions

NCAA tournament, First Round
- Conference: Mountain West Conference
- Record: 27–8 (15–5 MW)
- Head coach: Ryun Williams (14th season)
- Assistant coaches: Rico Burkett; Linda Sayavongchanh; Rachel Erickson; Annie Brady
- Home arena: Moby Arena

2025–26 Mountain West Conference women's basketball standings
	Conf.				Overall
Team	W		L	PCT	W		L	PCT
San Diego State	19	–	1	.950	27	–	6	.818
UNLV	15	–	5	.750	21	–	11	.656
Colorado State †	15	–	5	.750	27	–	8	.771
New Mexico	14	–	6	.700	22	–	10	.688
Boise State	14	–	6	.700	25	–	9	.735
Grand Canyon	11	–	9	.550	13	–	19	.406
Fresno State	8	–	12	.400	15	–	18	.455
Wyoming	7	–	13	.350	10	–	20	.333
Air Force	7	–	13	.350	16	–	19	.457
Nevada	6	–	14	.300	10	–	21	.323
Utah State	2	–	18	.100	6	–	24	.200
San Jose State	2	–	18	.100	4	–	28	.125
† 2026 Mountain West tournament winner

The 2025–26 Colorado State Rams women's basketball team represented Colorado State University during the 2025–26 NCAA Division I women's basketball season. The Rams, led by 14th-year head coach Ryun Williams, played their home games at Moby Arena in Fort Collins, Colorado as members of the Mountain West Conference.

The 2025-2026 Rams went 27-7 overall, 15-5 in conference play. They won the 2026 Mountain West Conference women's basketball tournament as the 3 seed, with wins over 6 seed Grand Canyon, 2 seed UNLV, and 9 seed Air Force, making their return to the NCAA Tournament for the first time in a decade. 27 wins is the 3rd most wins in program history, and the 2nd most under Coach Williams.

This season marked Colorado State's last season as members of the Mountain West Conference, as they will be joining the newly reformed Pac-12 Conference, effective July 1, 2026.

== Previous season ==
The Rams finished the 2024–25 season 22–10, 13–5 in Mountain West play, to finish in third place. They were upset by #6 seed Fresno State in the quarterfinals of the Mountain West tournament.

== Preseason ==
On October 22, 2025, the Mountain West Conference released their preseason poll. Colorado State was picked to finish third in the conference, with one first-place vote.

=== Preseason rankings ===
MW Preseason Poll
Place	Team	Votes
1	UNLV	281 (19)
2	San Diego State	240 (3)
3	Colorado State	236 (1)
4	Boise State	210 (1)
5	New Mexico	207 (2)
6	Wyoming	194
7	Grand Canyon	177 (1)
8	Air Force	132
9	Fresno State	95
10	Nevada	92
11	Utah State	54
12	San Jose State	44
(#) first-place votes

=== Preseason All-MW Team ===
Preseason All-MW Team
Position	Player	Year
Guard	Hannah Ronsiek	Senior

== Roster ==
2025–26 Colorado State Rams women's basketball team
Players
Coaches

Pos.	#	Name	Height	Year	Previous school	Hometown
F	0	Madelyn Bragg	6 ft 3 in (1.91 m)	Sr	Northern State	Aberdeen, South Dakota
G	1	Kloe Froebe	5 ft 10 in (1.78 m)	So	Lincoln Community High School	Lincoln, Illinois
G	2	Brooke Carlson	5 ft 8 in (1.73 m)	So	Batavia High School	Batavia, Illinois
G	3	Lexus Bargesser	5 ft 9 in (1.75 m)	Sr	Indiana	Grass Lake, Michigan
G	4	Allie Roden	5 ft 10 in (1.78 m)	Fr	Clackamas High School	Clackamas, Oregon
F	5	Jadyn Fife	6 ft 0 in (1.83 m)	RS Jr	Liberty Christian School	North Richland Hills, Texas
F	6	Lexi Deden	6 ft 2 in (1.88 m)	GS	Montana State	Missoula, Montana
G/F	10	Bree Bowman	6 ft 0 in (1.83 m)	Fr	Prior Lake High School	Prior Lake, Minnesota
G	11	Gianna Smith	5 ft 11 in (1.8 m)	Fr	Arapahoe High School	Littleton, Colorado
G	14	Marta Leimane	6 ft 0 in (1.83 m)	Sr	Riga 47th Secondary	Ventspils, Latvia
G	23	Caitlin Kramer	6 ft 3 in (1.91 m)	RS Fr	Air Academy High School	Colorado Springs, Colorado
F	24	Olivia Pawlicki	6 ft 1 in (1.85 m)	RS Fr	Shakopee High School	Shakopee, Minnesota
G	30	Hannah Ronsiek	5 ft 11 in (1.8 m)	Sr	O'Gorman High School	Sioux Falls, South Dakota
G	31	McKenna Murphy	5 ft 11 in (1.8 m)	RS Fr	Elkhorn North High School	Omaha, Nebraska

Head coach

- Ryun Williams (South Dakota)

Assistant coach(es)

- Rico Burkett (North Dakota)
- Linda Sayavongchanh (Drake)
- Rachel Erickson (Black Hills State)
- Annie Brady (Colorado State)

Legend

- (C) Team captain
- (S) Suspended
- (I) Ineligible
- (W) Walk-on
- Injured
- Current redshirt

Roster
Last update: January 16, 2026

== Schedule and results ==
Date time, TV	Rank^{#}	Opponent^{#}	Result	Record	High points	High rebounds	High assists	Site (attendance) city, state
Exhibition
October 29, 2025*; 6:30 pm		Colorado Christian	W 81–26	–	15 – Murphy	10 – Froebe	8 – Carlson	Moby Arena; Fort Collins, CO
Non-conference regular season
November 4, 2025*; 6:00 pm, MW Network		Weber State	W 75–58	1–0	22 – Bargesser	6 – Tied	6 – Froebe	Moby Arena (1,670); Fort Collins, CO
November 9, 2025*; 1:00 pm, MW Network		Long Beach State	W 73–34	2–0	17 – Bargesser	7 – Tied	5 – Carlson	Moby Arena (6,405); Fort Collins, CO
November 13, 2025*; 7:00 pm, ESPN+		at Gonzaga	W 70–66	3–0	17 – Froebe	6 – Froebe	2 – Tied	McCarthey Athletic Center (4,936); Spokane, WA
November 17, 2025*; 6:30 pm, MW Network		San Diego	W 71–44	4–0	18 – Bargesser	10 – Ronsiek	3 – Tied	Moby Arena (1,580); Fort Collins, CO
November 21, 2025*; 7:00 pm, ESPN+		at Oregon State	W 64−58	5−0	17 – Bargesser	9 – Froebe	4 – Carlson	Gill Coliseum (3,582); Corvallis, OR
November 25, 2025*; 6:30 pm, MW Network		South Dakota Mines	W 88−43	6−0	18 – Murphy	8 – Tied	6 – Froebe	Moby Arena (1,832); Fort Collins, CO
November 28, 2025*; 8:30 pm, FloCollege		vs. Texas Southern; Resorts World Classic	W 78–54	7–0	20 – Carlson	11 – Froebe	3 – Tied	Resorts World Events Center; Winchester, NV
November 29, 2025*; 6:00 pm, FloCollege		vs. Stanford; Resorts World Classic	L 60–62	7–1	19 – Bargesser	7 – Froebe	6 – Carlson	Resorts World Events Center; Winchester, NV
December 4, 2025*; 6:30 pm, MW Network		Utah	L 58–70	7–2	19 – Bargesser	10 – Bargesser	3 – Carlson	Moby Arena (2,817); Fort Collins, CO
December 7, 2025*; 1:00 pm, MW Network		Southern Utah	W 70–47	8–2	23 – Bargesser	9 – Bargesser	5 – Bargesser	Moby Arena (1,662); Fort Collins, CO
December 13, 2025*; 3:00 pm, ESPN+		at San Francisco	W 69–52	9–2	22 – Bargesser	8 – Bargesser	4 – Bargesser	Sobrato Center (156); San Francisco, CA
Mountain West regular season
December 17, 2025; 7:30 pm, MW Network		at Nevada	W 61−48	10−2 (1–0)	14 – Bargesser	8 – Deden	4 – Bargesser	Lawlor Events Center (1,223); Reno, NV
December 20, 2025; 1:00 pm, MW Network		Utah State	W 55–46	11–2 (2–0)	12 – Tied	9 – Froebe	3 – Carlson	Moby Arena (1,598); Fort Collins, CO
December 31, 2025; 11:00 am, MW Network		at Grand Canyon	W 61–47	12–2 (3–0)	14 – Bargesser	11 – Bargesser	3 – Leimane	Global Credit Union Arena (625); Phoenix, AZ
January 3, 2026; 1:00 pm, MW Network		Fresno State	W 86–83	13–2 (4–0)	18 – Carlson	7 – Bragg	6 – Bargesser	Moby Arena (1,833); Fort Collins, CO
January 7, 2026; 6:30 pm, MW Network		New Mexico	L 59–66	13–3 (4–1)	21 – Froebe	8 – Froebe	5 – Carlson	Moby Arena (1,208); Fort Collins, CO
January 10, 2026; 1:00 pm, MW Network		at Boise State	L 59–62	13–4 (4–2)	13 – Bargesser	6 – Ronsiek	4 – Bargesser	ExtraMile Arena (1,831); Boise, ID
January 14, 2026; 6:30 pm, MW Network		at Air Force	W 65–63	14–4 (5–2)	19 – Bargesser	7 – Bragg	3 – Froebe	Clune Arena; Air Force Academy, CO
January 17, 2026; 1:00 pm, MW Network		San Jose State	W 75–60	15–4 (6–2)	22 – Bargesser	14 – Froebe	5 – Froebe	Moby Arena (1,670); Fort Collins, CO
January 21, 2026; 6:30 pm, MW Network		Grand Canyon	W 67–50	16–4 (7–2)	14 – Ronsiek	11 – Ronsiek	4 – Froebe	Moby Arena (1,357); Fort Collins, CO
January 24, 2026; 3:00 pm, MW Network		at Fresno State	W 68–55	17–4 (8–2)	18 – Bragg	10 – Tied	7 – Bargesser	Save Mart Center (1,159); Fresno, CA
January 28, 2026; 11:00 am, MW Network		San Diego State	L 44–46	17–5 (8–3)	14 – Bargesser	10 – Froebe	1 – Tied	Moby Arena (5,582); Fort Collins, CO
January 31, 2026; 1:00 pm, FS1		at UNLV	L 51–64	17–6 (8–4)	26 – Bargesser	5 – Tied	2 – Tied	Cox Pavilion (1,103); Paradise, NV
February 7, 2026; 2:00 pm, MW Network		Wyoming; Border War	W 83–54	18–6 (9–4)	23 – Carlson	7 – Tied	5 – Froebe	Moby Arena (8,083); Fort Collins, CO
February 11, 2026; 7:00 pm, MW Network		at San Diego State	L 61–64	18–7 (9–5)	16 – Bargesser	6 – Leimane	2 – Tied	Viejas Arena (1,358); San Diego, CA
February 14, 2026; 1:00 pm, MW Network		at New Mexico	W 66–46	19–7 (10–5)	19 – Froebe	8 – Froebe	7 – Carlson	The Pit (5,240); Albuquerque, NM
February 18, 2026; 6:30 pm, MW Network		Nevada	W 70–59	20–7 (11-5)	17 – Tied	10 – Bragg	5 – Carlson	Moby Arena (1,351); Fort Collins, CO
February 21, 2026; 2:00 pm, MW Network		at Wyoming; Border War	W 62–48	21–7 (12-5)	15 – Tied	7 – Bragg	5 – Carlson	Arena-Auditorium (2,380); Laramie, WY
February 25, 2026; 6:30 pm, MW Network		UNLV	W 77–61	22–7 (13–5)	19 – Bargesser	9 – Bargesser	4 – Tied	Moby Arena (1,432); Fort Collins, CO
February 28, 2026; 1:00 pm, MW Network		Air Force	W 66–52	23–7 (14–5)	16 – Bargesser	20 – Froebe	6 – Carlson	Moby Arena (2,188); Fort Collins, CO
March 3, 2026; 8:00 pm, MW Network		at San Jose State	W 67–44	24–7 (15–5)	14 – Tied	7 – Bargesser	3 – Tied	Provident Credit Union Event Center (428); San Jose, CA
Mountain West tournament
March 8, 2026; 8:30 pm, MW Network	(3)	vs. (6) Grand Canyon; Quarterfinals	W 61–59	25–7	19 – Bargesser	5 – Tied	5 – Tied	Thomas & Mack Center (1,545); Paradise, NV
March 9, 2026; 8:30 pm, MW Network	(3)	vs. (2) UNLV; Semifinals	W 66–59	26–7	19 – Carlson	11 – Froebe	5 – Carlson	Thomas & Mack Center (909); Paradise, NV
March 10, 2026; 7:30 pm, CBSSN	(3)	vs. (9) Air Force; Championship	W 56–42	27–7	17 – Carlson	10 – Froebe	4 – Leimane	Thomas & Mack Center (N/A); Paradise, NV
NCAA tournament
March 20, 2026*; 5:30 p.m., ESPNews	(12 S4)	vs. (5 S4) No. 20 Michigan State; First Round	L 62–65	27–8	26 – Carlson	8 – Ronsiek	3 – Tied	Lloyd Noble Center; Norman, OK
*Non-conference game. ^{#}Rankings from AP Poll. (#) Tournament seedings in parentheses. All times are in Mountain.

== See also ==
- 2025–26 Colorado State Rams men's basketball team
