= 2025–26 Boise State Broncos women's basketball team =

American college basketball season

2025–26 Boise State Broncos women's basketball
- Conference: Mountain West Conference
- Record: 25-9 (14-6 MW)
- Head coach: Gordy Presnell (21st season)
- Assistant coaches: Heather Sower; Cariann Ramirez; Mike Petrino; Jackie Robinson
- Home arena: ExtraMile Arena

2025–26 Mountain West Conference women's basketball standings
	Conf.				Overall
Team	W		L	PCT	W		L	PCT
San Diego State	19	–	1	.950	27	–	6	.818
UNLV	15	–	5	.750	21	–	11	.656
Colorado State †	15	–	5	.750	27	–	8	.771
New Mexico	14	–	6	.700	22	–	10	.688
Boise State	14	–	6	.700	25	–	9	.735
Grand Canyon	11	–	9	.550	13	–	19	.406
Fresno State	8	–	12	.400	15	–	18	.455
Wyoming	7	–	13	.350	10	–	20	.333
Air Force	7	–	13	.350	16	–	19	.457
Nevada	6	–	14	.300	10	–	21	.323
Utah State	2	–	18	.100	6	–	24	.200
San Jose State	2	–	18	.100	4	–	28	.125
† 2026 Mountain West tournament winner

The 2025–26 Boise State Broncos women's basketball team represents Boise State University during the 2025–26 NCAA Division I women's basketball season. The Broncos, led by 21st-year head coach Gordy Presnell, play their home games at ExtraMile Arena in Boise, Idaho, as members of the Mountain West Conference.

This season will mark Boise State's last season as members of the Mountain West Conference, as they will be joining the newly reformed Pac-12 Conference, effective July 1, 2026.

== Previous season ==
The Broncos finished the 2024–25 season 18–15, 7–11 in Mountain West play, to finish in a tie for seventh place. They defeated Nevada, before falling to top-seeded UNLV in the quarterfinals of the Mountain West tournament.

== Preseason ==
On October 22, 2025, the Mountain West Conference released their preseason poll. Boise State was picked to finish fourth in the conference, with one first-place vote.

=== Preseason rankings ===
MW Preseason Poll
Place	Team	Votes
1	UNLV	281 (19)
2	San Diego State	240 (3)
3	Colorado State	236 (1)
4	Boise State	210 (1)
5	New Mexico	207 (2)
6	Wyoming	194
7	Grand Canyon	177 (1)
8	Air Force	132
9	Fresno State	95
10	Nevada	92
11	Utah State	54
12	San Jose State	44
(#) first-place votes

=== Preseason All-MW Team ===
Preseason All-MW Team
Position	Player	Year
Guard	Natalie Pasco	Senior
Forward	Tatum Thompson	Senior

== Roster ==
2025–26 Boise State Broncos women's basketball team
Players
Coaches

Pos.	#	Name	Height	Year	Previous school	Hometown
F	0	Tatum Thompson	6 ft 1 in (1.85 m)	Sr	Woodinville High School	Woodinville, Washington
C	2	Emily Howard	6 ft 5 in (1.96 m)	RS Jr	Liberty	Vancouver, British Columbia
G	3	Morgan Maldonado	5 ft 9 in (1.75 m)	Fr	Mountain City Christian Academy	Anchorage, Alaska
G	4	Dani Bayes	5 ft 11 in (1.8 m)	Sr	Sheldon College	Brisbane, Australia
G	6	Milly Sharp	5 ft 9 in (1.75 m)	So	Ballarat Miners	Ballarat, Australia
F	7	Izzie Harms	6 ft 1 in (1.85 m)	Fr	Willamette High School	Eugene, Oregon
F	9	Libby Hutton	6 ft 0 in (1.83 m)	So	Perry Lakes Hawks	Perth, Australia
C	10	Madeline Cooke (6th)	6 ft 3 in (1.91 m)	Sr	The Master's	Meridian, Idaho
G	14	Mya Hansen	5 ft 9 in (1.75 m)	Sr	Billings Central Catholic High School	Billings, Montana
F	21	Mason Borcherding	6 ft 1 in (1.85 m)	Fr	Legend High School	Parker, Colorado
C	22	Kenna Garza	6 ft 2 in (1.88 m)	Fr	Pocatello High School	Pocatello, Idaho
G	24	Jayda Lewis	5 ft 10 in (1.78 m)	Fr	Garfield High School	Seattle, Washington
F	25	Josee Steadman	5 ft 11 in (1.8 m)	RS Sr	Colorado Mesa	Blackfoot, Idaho
G	32	Natalie Pasco	5 ft 10 in (1.78 m)	Sr	San Ramon Valley High School	Danville, California
G	35	Keirra Thompson	5 ft 8 in (1.73 m)	Fr	Camas High School	Camas, Washington

Head coach

- Gordy Presnell (Northwest Nazarene)

Assistant coach(es)

- Heather Sower (Boise State)
- Cariann Ramirez (Boise State)
- Mike Petrino (Montana State Billings)
- Jackie Robinson (Evergreen State)

Legend

- (C) Team captain
- (S) Suspended
- (I) Ineligible
- (W) Walk-on
- (6th) Sixth-year senior
- Injured
- Current redshirt

Roster
Last update: January 17, 2026

== Schedule and results ==
Date time, TV	Rank^{#}	Opponent^{#}	Result	Record	High points	High rebounds	High assists	Site (attendance) city, state
Non-conference regular season
November 3, 2025*; 12:00 pm, MWN		Eastern Oregon	W 59–51	1–0	15 – Hutton	10 – Hutton	4 – Hansen	ExtraMile Arena (4,249); Boise, ID
November 9, 2025*; 2:00 pm, MWN		San Francisco	W 83–68	2–0	22 – Pasco	9 – Hutton	9 – Hansen	ExtraMile Arena (1,761); Boise, ID
November 14, 2025*; 6:30 pm, MWN		UC Davis	W 91–77	3–0	31 – Bayes	14 – T. Thompson	3 – Tied	ExtraMile Arena (1,645); Boise, ID
November 18, 2025*; 7:00 pm, ESPN+		at Colorado	L 53–83	3–1	14 – Pasco	5 – Borcherding	5 – K. Thompson	CU Events Center (1,805); Boulder, CO
November 21, 2025*; 6:30 pm, MWN		Seattle	W 86−65	4−1	24 – T. Thompson	8 – T. Thompson	9 – Hansen	ExtraMile Arena (1,708); Boise, ID
November 23, 2025*; 2:00 pm, MWN		UC Riverside	W 67−56	5−1	19 – Pasco	7 – Hutton	5 – Tied	ExtraMile Arena (1,617); Boise, ID
November 27, 2025*; 1:00 pm, ESPN+		vs. North Dakota; Paradise Jam Harbor Division semifinals	W 65–45	6–1	16 – T. Thompson	9 – T. Thompson	6 – Bayes	UVI Sports and Fitness Center (224); St. Thomas, USVI
November 28, 2025*; 1:00 pm, ESPN+		vs. Tulane; Paradise Jam Harbor Division championship	W 81–76	7–1	20 – Bayes	8 – Bayes	5 – Bayes	UVI Sports and Fitness Center (133); St. Thomas, USVI
December 6, 2025*; 1:00 pm, MWN		California Baptist	W 82–80	8–1	20 – Bayes	13 – T. Thompson	5 – Hansen	ExtraMile Arena (1,696); Boise, ID
December 10, 2025*; 7:00 pm, ESPN+		at Utah	L 58–91	8–2	13 – Hansen	5 – T. Thompson	5 – Hansen	Jon M. Huntsman Center (2,182); Salt Lake City, UT
December 13, 2025*; 1:00 pm, MWN		Southern Utah	W 81–66	9–2	23 – T. Thompson	8 – Hutton	8 – Hansen	ExtraMile Arena (1,749); Boise, ID
Mountain West regular season
December 17, 2025; 7:00 pm, MWN		at New Mexico	L 63−70	9−3 (0–1)	17 – Hutton	9 – Hutton	6 – Pasco	The Pit (4,316); Albuquerque, NM
December 20, 2025; 2:00 pm, MWN		at San Diego State	L 54–83	9–4 (0–2)	14 – Hutton	6 – Bayes	3 – Hansen	Viejas Arena (1,183); San Diego, CA
December 31, 2025; 2:00 pm, MWN		Nevada	W 74–62	10–4 (1–2)	23 – T. Thompson	13 – T. Thompson	5 – T. Thompson	ExtraMile Arena (2,032); Boise, ID
January 3, 2026; 2:00 pm, MWN		Grand Canyon	L 76–87	10–5 (1–3)	23 – Bayes	13 – T. Thompson	5 – Hansen	ExtraMile Arena (1,911); Boise, ID
January 7, 2026; 6:30 pm, Altitude		at Air Force	W 70–59	11–5 (2–3)	24 – Pasco	7 – T. Thompson	6 – Hansen	Clune Arena (526); Air Force Academy, CO
January 10, 2026; 1:00 pm, MWN		Colorado State	W 62–59	12–5 (3–3)	25 – T. Thompson	11 – Bayes	5 – Bayes	ExtraMile Arena (1,831); Boise, ID
January 14, 2026; 6:30 pm, MWN		Wyoming	W 77–40	13–5 (4–3)	15 – Bayes	10 – T. Thompson	4 – K. Thompson	ExtraMile Arena (1,861); Boise, ID
January 17, 2026; 7:00 pm, MWN		at Utah State	W 76–60	14–5 (5–3)	14 – Bayes	9 – Bayes	4 – Bayes	Smith Spectrum (833); Logan, UT
January 21, 2026; 6:30 pm, MWN		Fresno State	W 60-52	15-5 (6-3)	25 – Hutton	9 – Hutton	5 – Hansen	ExtraMile Arena (1,646); Boise, ID
January 24, 2026; 1:00 pm, MWN		at Grand Canyon	W 75-65	16-5 (7-3)	23 – Bayes	10 – T. Thompson	6 – Tied	Global Credit Union Arena (1,104); Phoenix, AZ
January 31, 2026; 2:00 pm, MWN		San Jose State	W 96-62	17-5 (8-3)	28 – T. Thompson	10 – Bayes	8 – Hansen	ExtraMile Arena (2,146); Boise, ID
February 4, 2026; 11:30 am, MWN		at Nevada	W 70-61	18-5 (9-3)	16 – Hutton	6 – Hutton	4 – T. Thompson	Lawlor Events Center (5,888); Reno, NV
February 7, 2026; 1:00 pm, MWN		New Mexico	W 63-35	19-5 (10-3)	16 – Pasco	13 – T. Thompson	6 – T. Thompson	ExtraMile Arena (2,055); Boise, ID
February 11, 2026; 7:30 pm, MWN		at Fresno State	L 69-75	19-6 (10-4)	19 – Pasco	9 – T. Thompson	4 – T. Thompson	Save Mart Center (1,200); Fresno, CA
February 14, 2026; 2:00 pm, MWN		at Wyoming	W 56-54	20-6 (11-4)	20 – Hutton	9 – Hutton	3 – Maldonado	Arena-Auditorium (2,092); Laramie, WY
February 18, 2026; 6:30 pm, MWN		Air Force	W 70-62	21-6 (12-4)	21 – Pasco	6 – Bayes	6 – Bayes	ExtraMile Arena (1,835); Boise, ID
February 21, 2026; 3:00 pm, MWN		at San Jose State	W 71-48	22-6 (13-4)	25 – T. Thompson	7 – Tied	5 – Hansen	Provident Credit Union Event Center (587); San Jose, CA
February 25, 2026; 6:30 pm, MWN		San Diego State	L 64-66	22-7 (13-5)	14 – Tied	9 – T. Thompson	4 – Tied	ExtraMile Arena (2,321); Boise, ID
February 28, 2026; 2:00 pm, MWN		Utah State	W 75-59	23-7 (14-5)	19 – T. Thompson	9 – Hutton	10 – Hansen	ExtraMile Arena (3,778); Boise, ID
March 4, 2026; 7:30 pm, MWN		at UNLV	L 47-76	23-8 (14-6)	12 – Hutton	5 – Tied	2 – Tied	Cox Pavilion (636); Paradise, NV
Mountain West tournament
March 7, 2026; 3:30 pm, MW Network	(5)	vs. (12) San Jose State; First Round	W 68-51	24-8	21 – Pasco	13 – Hutton	3 – Bayes	Thomas & Mack Center; Paradise, NV
March 8, 2026; 3:30 pm, MW Network	(5)	vs. (4) New Mexico; Quarterfinal	W 62-61	25-8	15 – Bayes	8 – Tied	4 – Tied	Thomas & Mack Center; Paradise, NV
March 9, 2026; 6:00 pm, MW Network	(5)	vs. (9) Air Force; Semifinal	L 66-68	25-9	25 – Hutton	7 – Hutton	4 – Tied	Thomas & Mack Center; Paradise, NV
*Non-conference game. ^{#}Rankings from AP Poll. (#) Tournament seedings in parentheses. All times are in Mountain.
