= 2025–26 New Mexico Lobos women's basketball team =

American college basketball season

2025–26 New Mexico Lobos women's basketball
- Conference: Mountain West Conference
- Record: 22–10 (14–6 MW)
- Head coach: Mike Bradbury (10th season)
- Associate head coach: Keith Freeman
- Assistant coaches: Nike McClure; Mackenzie Head
- Home arena: The Pit

2025–26 Mountain West Conference women's basketball standings
| | Conf. | | | | Overall |
| Team | W | | L | PCT | W | | L | PCT |
|---|---|---|---|---|---|---|---|---|
| San Diego State | 19 | – | 1 | .950 | 27 | – | 6 | .818 |
| UNLV | 15 | – | 5 | .750 | 21 | – | 11 | .656 |
| Colorado State † | 15 | – | 5 | .750 | 27 | – | 8 | .771 |
| New Mexico | 14 | – | 6 | .700 | 22 | – | 10 | .688 |
| Boise State | 14 | – | 6 | .700 | 25 | – | 9 | .735 |
| Grand Canyon | 11 | – | 9 | .550 | 13 | – | 19 | .406 |
| Fresno State | 8 | – | 12 | .400 | 15 | – | 18 | .455 |
| Wyoming | 7 | – | 13 | .350 | 10 | – | 20 | .333 |
| Air Force | 7 | – | 13 | .350 | 16 | – | 19 | .457 |
| Nevada | 6 | – | 14 | .300 | 10 | – | 21 | .323 |
| Utah State | 2 | – | 18 | .100 | 6 | – | 24 | .200 |
| San Jose State | 2 | – | 18 | .100 | 4 | – | 28 | .125 |
† 2026 Mountain West tournament winner

The 2025–26 New Mexico Lobos women's basketball team represents the University of New Mexico during the 2025–26 NCAA Division I women's basketball season. The Lobos, led by tenth-year head coach Mike Bradbury, play their home games at The Pit in Albuquerque, New Mexico, as members of the Mountain West Conference.

== Previous season ==
The Lobos finished the 2024–25 season 18–14, 11–7 in Mountain West play, to finish in a tie for fourth place. They were defeated by eventual tournament champions San Diego State in the quarterfinals of the Mountain West tournament.

== Preseason ==
On October 22, 2025, the Mountain West Conference released their preseason poll. New Mexico was picked to finish fifth in the conference, with two first-place votes.

=== Preseason rankings ===
MW Preseason Poll
| Place | Team | Votes |
|---|---|---|
| 1 | UNLV | 281 (19) |
| 2 | San Diego State | 240 (3) |
| 3 | Colorado State | 236 (1) |
| 4 | Boise State | 210 (1) |
| 5 | New Mexico | 207 (2) |
| 6 | Wyoming | 194 |
| 7 | Grand Canyon | 177 (1) |
| 8 | Air Force | 132 |
| 9 | Fresno State | 95 |
| 10 | Nevada | 92 |
| 11 | Utah State | 54 |
| 12 | San Jose State | 44 |
(#) first-place votes

=== Preseason All-MW Team ===
Preseason All-MW Team
| Position | Player | Year |
|---|---|---|
| Guard | Destinee Hooks | Junior |

== Roster ==
2025–26 New Mexico Lobos women's basketball team
Players
Coaches

| Pos. | # | Name | Height | Year | Previous school | Hometown |
|---|---|---|---|---|---|---|
| G | 3 | Destinee Hooks | 5 ft 9 in (1.75 m) | Jr | Vincennes | Indianapolis, Indiana |
| G | 4 | Alyssa Hargrove | 5 ft 8 in (1.73 m) | Sr | Austin Peay | Dayton, Ohio |
| G | 5 | Kaia Foster | 6 ft 2 in (1.88 m) | Fr | Chiawana High School | Pasco, Washington |
| G | 10 | Cacia Antonio | 5 ft 11 in (1.8 m) | Jr | New Mexico Junior College | Luanda, Angola |
| G | 11 | Nayli Padilla | 5 ft 9 in (1.75 m) | So | ÍES Tarahales | Santa Cruz de Tenerife, Spain |
| G | 13 | Joana Magalhães | 5 ft 5 in (1.65 m) | So | Quinta Do Marquês | Lisbon, Portugal |
| F | 14 | Leonor Peixinho | 6 ft 1 in (1.85 m) | Fr | Escola Secundária Dom Pedro V | Lagoa, Portugal |
| G | 15 | Drew Jordon | 5 ft 11 in (1.8 m) | Jr | Wagner | Washington, D.C. |
| G | 20 | Tyler Jones | 5 ft 9 in (1.75 m) | Fr | Hutchison School | Memphis, Tennessee |
| F | 23 | Emma Najjuma | 6 ft 4 in (1.93 m) | RS So | New Mexico Junior College | Mukono Seeta, Uganda |
| F | 24 | Jessie Joaquim | 6 ft 2 in (1.88 m) | Jr | Cochise College | Maputo, Mozambique |
| F/C | 40 | Clarissa Craig | 6 ft 3 in (1.91 m) | RS Sr | Cincinnati | Cincinnati, Ohio |
| PG | 44 | Laila Abdurraqib | 5 ft 6 in (1.68 m) | Fr | Lawrence Central High School | Fishers, Indiana |

Head coach

- Mike Bradbury (Chattanooga)

Assistant coach(es)

- Keith Freeman (Huntington)
- Nike McClure (New Mexico)
- Mackenzie Head (Bethel)

Legend

- (C) Team captain
- (S) Suspended
- (I) Ineligible
- (W) Walk-on
- Injured
- Current redshirt

Roster
Last update: January 17, 2026

== Schedule and results ==
| Date time, TV | Rank^{#} | Opponent^{#} | Result | Record | High points | High rebounds | High assists | Site (attendance) city, state |
Non-conference regular season
| November 3, 2025*; 7:00 pm | | Northern Arizona | W 77–59 | 1–0 | 16 – Craig | 6 – Foster | 5 – Hargrove | The Pit (3,850); Albuquerque, NM |
| November 6, 2025*; 6:00 pm, ESPN+ | | at Colorado | L 59–84 | 1–1 | 22 – Hooks | 7 – Hooks | 3 – Hargrove | CU Events Center (1,735); Boulder, CO |
| November 9, 2025*; 1:00 pm, MWN | | North Carolina A&T | W 71–64 | 2–1 | 20 – Hooks | 6 – Najjuma | 3 – Tied | The Pit (4,068); Albuquerque, NM |
| November 12, 2025*; 11:00 am, MWN | | New Orleans | W 99–65 | 3–1 | 17 – Padilla | 6 – Joaquim | 4 – Hargrove | The Pit (4,350); Albuquerque, NM |
| November 16, 2025*; 2:00 pm, ESPN+ | | at New Mexico State; Rio Grande Rivalry | W 77−45 | 4−1 | 14 – Padilla | 8 – Craig | 4 – Jones | Pan American Center (1,408); Las Cruces, NM |
| November 20, 2025*; 7:00 pm, MWN | | UT Martin | W 77−45 | 5−1 | 15 – Hooks | 10 – Joaquim | 4 – Hargrove | The Pit (3,955); Albuquerque, NM |
| November 23, 2025*; 1:00 pm, Altitude | | Texas Tech | L 57–82 | 5–2 | 24 – Hooks | 5 – Tied | 3 – Hargrove | The Pit (4,623); Albuquerque, NM |
| November 28, 2025*; 9:00 am | | vs. Chicago State; Florida Gulf Classic | W 80–53 | 6–2 | 17 – Antonio | 10 – Najjuma | 3 – Tied | Community School of Naples (60); Naples, FL |
| November 29, 2025*; 1:30 pm | | vs. Cincinnati; Florida Gulf Classic | L 60–63 | 6–3 | 19 – Padilla | 11 – Tied | 2 – Tied | Community School of Naples (173); Naples, FL |
| December 7, 2025*; 2:00 pm, ESPN+ | | at Arizona | W 72–69 | 7–3 | 16 – Hargrove | 16 – Najjuma | 4 – Tied | McKale Center (6,014); Tucson, AZ |
| December 13, 2025*; 7:00 pm, MWN | | Houston | W 63–41 | 8–3 | 13 – Joaquim | 12 – Joaquim | 4 – Padilla | The Pit (4,467); Albuquerque, NM |
Mountain West regular season
| December 17, 2025; 7:00 pm, MWN | | Boise State | W 70−63 | 9−3 (1–0) | 16 – Magalhães | 8 – Najjuma | 5 – Hargrove | The Pit (4,316); Albuquerque, NM |
| December 20, 2025; 2:00 pm, MWN | | at UNLV | L 71–89 | 9–4 (1–1) | 22 – Antonio | 7 – Najjuma | 3 – Antonio | Cox Pavilion (536); Paradise, NV |
| December 31, 2025; 1:00 pm, MWN | | Wyoming | W 62–48 | 10–4 (2–1) | 14 – Antonio | 15 – Najjuma | 4 – Padilla | The Pit (4,844); Albuquerque, NM |
| January 3, 2026; 3:00 pm, MWN | | at San Jose State | W 89–51 | 11–4 (3–1) | 15 – Tied | 16 – Joaquim | 6 – Jones | Provident Credit Union Event Center (302); San Jose, CA |
| January 7, 2026; 6:30 pm, MWN | | at Colorado State | W 66–59 | 12–4 (4–1) | 25 – Abdurraqib | 7 – Joaquim | 2 – Tied | Moby Arena (1,208); Fort Collins, CO |
| January 10, 2026; 1:00 pm, MWN | | Nevada | L 61–70 | 12–5 (4–2) | 13 – Hooks | 4 – Tied | 4 – Abdurraqib | The Pit (4,667); Albuquerque, NM |
| January 14, 2026; 2:00 pm, MWN | | at San Diego State | L 56–73 | 12–6 (4–3) | 18 – Hooks | 6 – Padilla | 3 – Antonio | Viejas Arena (8,054); San Diego, CA |
| January 17, 2026; 2:30 pm, FS1 | | Grand Canyon | L 62–75 | 12–7 (4–4) | 17 – Hooks | 12 – Joaquim | 4 – Magalhães | The Pit (5,234); Albuquerque, NM |
| January 24, 2026; 1:00 pm, MWN | | at Air Force | W 74-57 | 13-7 (5-4) | 29 – Magalhães | 5 – Padilla | 5 – Hargrove | Clune Arena (1194); Air Force Academy, CO |
| January 28, 2026; 7:00 pm, MWN | | UNLV | W 68-57 | 14-7 (6-4) | 15 – Magalhães | 14 – Joaquim | 3 – Tied | The Pit (4366); Albuquerque, NM |
| January 31, 2026; 1:00 pm, MWN | | Utah State | W 58-33 | 15-7 (7-4) | 12 – Antonio | 12 – Joaquim | 3 – Hargrove | The Pit (5203); Albuquerque, NM |
| February 4, 2026; 6:30 pm, MWN | | at Wyoming | W 58-51 | 16-7 (8-4) | 13 – Padilla | 8 – Najjuma | 4 – Magalhães | Arena-Auditorium (1953); Laramie, WY |
| February 7, 2026; 1:00 pm, MWN | | at Boise State | L 35-63 | 16-8 (8-5) | 8 – Hooks | 10 – Joaquim | 3 – Hargrove | ExtraMile Arena (2055); Boise, ID |
| February 11, 2026; 7:00 pm, MWN | | San Jose State | W 66-61 | 17-8 (9-5) | 19 – Abdurraqib | 9 – tied | 5 – Padilla | The Pit (4204); Albuquerque, NM |
| February 14, 2026; 1:00 pm, MWN | | Colorado State | L 46-66 | 17-9 (9-6) | 12 – Hargrove | 6 – Najjuma | 1 – tied | The Pit (5240); Albuquerque, NM |
| February 18, 2026; 6:00 pm, MWN | | at Grand Canyon | W 70-68 | 18-9 (10-6) | 15 – Magalhães | 12 – Najjuma | 5 – Magalhães | Global Credit Union Arena (603); Phoenix, AZ |
| February 21, 2026; 1:00 pm, MWN | | Air Force | W 73-53 | 19-9 (11-6) | 12 – tied | 13 – Joaquim | 5 – Hargrove | The Pit (5505); Albuquerque, NM |
| February 25, 2026; 6:00 pm, MWN | | at Utah State | W 69-54 | 20-9 (12-6) | 14 – Magalhães | 10 – Joaquim | 5 – Hargrove | Smith Spectrum (696); Logan, UT |
| February 28, 2026; 2:00 pm, MWN | | at Nevada | W 63-56 | 21-9 (13-6) | 18 – Antonio | 9 – tied | 3 – Magalhães | Lawlor Events Center (1481); Reno, NV |
| March 3, 2026; 7:00 pm, MWN | | Fresno State | W 86-64 | 22-9 (14-6) | 22 – Hooks | 9 – Antonio | 3 – Hooks | The Pit (4452); Albuquerque, NM |
Mountain West tournament
| March 7, 2026; 3:30 pm, MWN | (4) | vs. (5) Boise State; Quarterfinals | L 61-62 | 22-10 | 29 – Hooks | 9 – Najjuma | 3 – Padilla | Thomas & Mack Center (1545); Paradise, NV |
*Non-conference game. ^{#}Rankings from AP Poll. (#) Tournament seedings in parentheses. All times are in Mountain.
