= 2025–26 Fresno State Bulldogs women's basketball team =

American college basketball season

2025–26 Fresno State Bulldogs women's basketball
- Conference: Mountain West Conference
- Record: 15-18 (8-12 MW)
- Head coach: Ryan McCarthy (1st season)
- Associate head coach: Shaina Afoa
- Assistant coaches: Ramaundo Vaughn; Jenna McCarthy; Jalon McCullough; Becca Bornhorst
- Home arena: Save Mart Center

2025–26 Mountain West Conference women's basketball standings
	Conf.				Overall
Team	W		L	PCT	W		L	PCT
San Diego State	19	–	1	.950	27	–	6	.818
UNLV	15	–	5	.750	21	–	11	.656
Colorado State †	15	–	5	.750	27	–	8	.771
New Mexico	14	–	6	.700	22	–	10	.688
Boise State	14	–	6	.700	25	–	9	.735
Grand Canyon	11	–	9	.550	13	–	19	.406
Fresno State	8	–	12	.400	15	–	18	.455
Wyoming	7	–	13	.350	10	–	20	.333
Air Force	7	–	13	.350	16	–	19	.457
Nevada	6	–	14	.300	10	–	21	.323
Utah State	2	–	18	.100	6	–	24	.200
San Jose State	2	–	18	.100	4	–	28	.125
† 2026 Mountain West tournament winner

The 2025–26 Fresno State Bulldogs women's basketball team represents California State University, Fresno during the 2025–26 NCAA Division I women's basketball season. The Bulldogs, led by first-year head coach Ryan McCarthy, play their home games at the Save Mart Center in Fresno, California, as members of the Mountain West Conference.

This season will mark Fresno State's last season as members of the Mountain West Conference, as they will be joining the newly reformed Pac-12 Conference, effective July 1, 2026.

== Previous season ==
The Bulldogs finished the 2024–25 season 19–15, 8–10 in Mountain West play, to finish in sixth place. They defeated San Jose State, and upset #3 seed Colorado State, before falling to Wyoming in the semifinals of the Mountain West tournament.

On March 24, 2025, it was announced that head coach Jaime White would be retiring, ending her eleven-year tenure with the team. On April 14, the school announced that they would be hiring Alaska Anchorage head coach Ryan McCarthy as the team's new head coach.

== Preseason ==
On October 22, 2025, the Mountain West Conference released their preseason poll. Fresno State was picked to finish ninth in the conference.

=== Preseason rankings ===
MW Preseason Poll
Place	Team	Votes
1	UNLV	281 (19)
2	San Diego State	240 (3)
3	Colorado State	236 (1)
4	Boise State	210 (1)
5	New Mexico	207 (2)
6	Wyoming	194
7	Grand Canyon	177 (1)
8	Air Force	132
9	Fresno State	95
10	Nevada	92
11	Utah State	54
12	San Jose State	44
(#) first-place votes

=== Preseason All-MW Team ===
No players were named to the Preseason All-MW Team.

== Roster ==
2025–26 Fresno State Bulldogs women's basketball team
Players
Coaches

Pos.	#	Name	Height	Year	Previous school	Hometown
G	1	Aloni Oliver	5 ft 9 in (1.75 m)	RS Fr	Buchanan High School	Clovis, California
G	3	Danae Powell	5 ft 7 in (1.7 m)	So	Centennial High School	Las Vegas, Nevada
F	4	Jaisa Gamble	6 ft 0 in (1.83 m)	Sr	Alaska Anchorage	San Bruno, California
F	8	Morelia Chavez	6 ft 1 in (1.85 m)	GS	Florida State	Morelia, Mexico
G	11	Emilia Long	5 ft 9 in (1.75 m)	GS	Alaska Anchorage	Port Angeles, Washington
F	12	Avery Watkins	6 ft 1 in (1.85 m)	RS Jr	Hawai'i	Seattle, Washington
F/C	14	Ashlyn Rean	6 ft 2 in (1.88 m)	So	Alaska Anchorage	Rangiora, New Zealand
G	20	Indiya Clarke	5 ft 11 in (1.8 m)	Sr	Wofford	Wasilla, Alaska
G	21	Ava Marr	5 ft 9 in (1.75 m)	Fr	Archbishop Murphy High School	Brier, Washington
F	24	Kenzie Sirowich	5 ft 10 in (1.78 m)	RS Jr	Alaska Anchorage	Seymour, Connecticut
F/C	25	Hedda Köehne	6 ft 2 in (1.88 m)	Sr	Alaska Anchorage	Lette, Germany
F	32	Djessira Diawara	6 ft 3 in (1.91 m)	GS	San Jose State	Bamako, Mali
G	34	Briana Webb	5 ft 9 in (1.75 m)	Fr	Piedmont High School	Hayward, California
G		Alexiz Graise (redshirt)	6 ft 0 in (1.83 m)	Fr	AZ Compass Prep	Phoenix, Arizona

Head coach

- Ryan McCarthy (Northwest Nazarene)

Assistant coach(es)

- Shaina Afoa (Central Washington)
- Ramaundo Vaughn (Hawaii Pacific)
- Jenna McCarthy (Florida Gulf Coast)
- Jalon McCullough (Alaska Fairbanks)
- Becca Bornhorst (Butler)

Legend

- (C) Team captain
- (S) Suspended
- (I) Ineligible
- (W) Walk-on
- Injured
- Current redshirt

Roster
Last update: January 19, 2026

== Schedule and results ==
Date time, TV	Rank^{#}	Opponent^{#}	Result	Record	High points	High rebounds	High assists	Site (attendance) city, state
Exhibition
October 26, 2025*; 3:00 pm		UC Merced	W 73–49	–	21 – Gamble	–	8 – Long	Save Mart Center; Fresno, CA
Non-conference regular season
November 3, 2025*; 5:00 pm, MWN		Fresno Pacific	W 87–38	1–0	18 – Tied	11 – Diawara	5 – Long	Save Mart Center; Fresno, CA
November 7, 2025*; 6:30 pm, ESPN+		at Cal State Bakersfield	W 74–51	2–0	28 – Rean	9 – Tied	5 – Köehne	Icardo Center (233); Bakersfield, CA
November 11, 2025*; 6:30 pm, MWN		Seattle	W 78–53	3–0	21 – Long	7 – Rean	2 – Tied	Save Mart Center (1,107); Fresno, CA
November 15, 2025*; 1:00 pm, ESPN+		at BYU	L 43–63	3–1	9 – Long	6 – Rean	3 – Tied	Marriott Center (1,287); Provo, UT
November 19, 2025*; 6:00 pm, B1G+		at No. 25 Washington	L 43−61	3−2	10 – Powell	5 – Tied	2 – Tied	Alaska Airlines Arena (2,167); Seattle, WA
November 23, 2025*; 1:00 pm, ESPN+		at Santa Clara	L 63−81	3−3	24 – Rean	10 – Rean	6 – Powell	Leavey Center (283); Santa Clara, CA
November 28, 2025*; 12:30 pm		vs. New Mexico State; Big Easy Classic	W 64–49	4–3	18 – Powell	6 – Gamble	7 – Long	Alario Center (111); Westwego, LA
November 29, 2025*; 12:30 pm		vs. Louisiana; Big Easy Classic	W 61–48	5–3	22 – Long	14 – Köehne	5 – Long	Alario Center (183); Westwego, LA
December 6, 2025*; 5:00 pm, MWN		Pepperdine	L 45–65	5–4	23 – Long	6 – Watkins	1 – Tied	Save Mart Center (1,259); Fresno, CA
December 10, 2025*; 6:30 pm, ESPN+		at Saint Mary's	L 57–60	5–5	19 – Long	5 – Powell	7 – Powell	University Credit Union Pavilion (329); Moraga, CA
December 13, 2025*; 5:00 pm, MWN		Chicago State	W 81–62	6–5	20 – Marr	11 – Watkins	7 – Powell	Save Mart Center (1,347); Fresno, CA
Mountain West regular season
December 17, 2025; 6:30 pm, MWN		San Diego State	L 53−63	6−6 (0–1)	16 – Powell	11 – Watkins	2 – Tied	Save Mart Center (1,015); Fresno, CA
December 20, 2025; 2:00 pm, MWN		Wyoming	W 53–36	7–6 (1–1)	17 – Powell	7 – Powell	5 – Long	Save Mart Center (1,210); Fresno, CA
December 31, 2025; 12:00 pm, MWN		at UNLV	L 59–85	7–7 (1–2)	13 – Gamble	7 – Powell	3 – Powell	Cox Pavilion (693); Paradise, NV
January 3, 2026; 12:00 pm, MWN		at Colorado State	L 83–86	7–8 (1–3)	25 – Watkins	8 – Watkins	6 – Long	Moby Arena (1,833); Fort Collins, CO
January 7, 2026; 6:30 pm, MWN		San Jose State	W 67–52	8–8 (2–3)	22 – Long	9 – Clarke	2 – Tied	Save Mart Center (917); Fresno, CA
January 10, 2026; 12:00 pm, MWN		at Grand Canyon	L 64–71	8–9 (2–4)	17 – Powell	7 – Tied	3 – Tied	Global Credit Union Arena (685); Phoenix, AZ
January 14, 2026; 6:30 pm, MWN		Utah State	W 86–56	9–9 (3–4)	21 – Long	10 – Tied	5 – Long	Save Mart Center; Fresno, CA
January 17, 2026; 1:00 pm, MWN		at Nevada	W 54–44	10–9 (4–4)	22 – Long	12 – Watkins	4 – Powell	Lawlor Events Center (1,421); Reno, NV
January 21, 2026; 5:30 pm, MWN		at Boise State	L 52-60	10-10 (4-5)	12 – Watkins	10 – Watkins	6 – Long	ExtraMile Arena (1,646); Boise, ID
January 24, 2026; 2:00 pm, MWN		Colorado State	L 55-68	10-11 (4-6)	17 – Long	8 – Long	3 – Long	Save Mart Center (1,159); Fresno, CA
January 28, 2026; 5:30 pm, MWN		at Wyoming	L 42-47	10-12 (4-7)	8 – Diawara	8 – Watkins	5 – Long	Arena-Auditorium (1,825); Laramie, WY
January 31, 2026; 3:00 pm, MWN		Air Force	L 56-61	10-13 (4-8)	15 – Powell	8 – Diawara	3 – Long	Save Mart Center (1,162); Fresno, CA
February 4, 2026; 7:00 pm, MWN		at San Jose State	W 79-50	11-13 (5-8)	19 – Long	13 – Diawara	4 – Tied	Provident Credit Union Event Center (313); San Jose, CA
February 7, 2026; 3:00 pm, MWN		Nevada	W 71-51	12-13 (6-8)	23 – Long	8 – Gamble	4 – Long	Save Mart Center (3,812); Fresno, CA
February 11, 2026; 6:30 pm, MWN		Boise State	W 75-69	13-13 (7-8)	22 – Powell	11 – Long	3 – Long	Save Mart Center (1,200); Fresno, CA
February 15, 2026; 12:00 pm, MWN		at Utah State	W 73-59	14-13 (8-8)	21 – Powell	7 – Tied	6 – Long	Smith Spectrum (660); Logan, UT
February 21, 2026; 1:00 pm, MWN		at San Diego State	L 59-68	14-14 (8-9)	14 – Long	7 – Powell	2 – Long	Viejas Arena (1,961); San Diego, CA
February 25, 2026; 6:30 pm, MWN		Grand Canyon	L 42-57	14-15 (8-10)	13 – Tied	8 – Long	1 – Tied	Save Mart Center (2,127); Fresno, CA
February 28, 2026; 2:00 pm, MWN		UNLV	L 54-68	14-16 (8-11)	14 – Long	11 – Long	4 – Tied	Save Mart Center (1,374); Fresno, CA
March 3, 2026; 6:00 pm, MWN		at New Mexico	L 64-86	14-17 (8-12)	27 – Powell	6 – Powell	6 – Long	The Pit (4,452); Albuquerque, NM
Mountain West tournament
March 7, 2026; 5:00 pm, MW Network	(7)	vs. (10) Nevada; First Round	W 74-57	15-17	15 – Long	7 – Watkins	4 – Tied	Thomas & Mack Center; Paradise, NV
March 8, 2026; 5:00 pm, MW Network	(7)	vs. (2) UNLV; Second Round	L 65-79	15-18	19 – Long	7 – Long	5 – Gamble	Thomas & Mack Center; Paradise, NV
*Non-conference game. ^{#}Rankings from AP Poll. (#) Tournament seedings in parentheses. All times are in Pacific.
