= 2025–26 San Jose State Spartans women's basketball team =

American college basketball season

2025–26 San Jose State Spartans women's basketball
- Conference: Mountain West Conference
- Record: 4–28 (2–18 MW)
- Head coach: Jonas Chatterton (1st season)
- Assistant coaches: Emily Codding; Jaime Gluesing; Brandon Morrison; Jordan Moser
- Home arena: Provident Credit Union Event Center

2025–26 Mountain West Conference women's basketball standings
	Conf.				Overall
Team	W		L	PCT	W		L	PCT
San Diego State	19	–	1	.950	27	–	6	.818
UNLV	15	–	5	.750	21	–	11	.656
Colorado State †	15	–	5	.750	27	–	8	.771
New Mexico	14	–	6	.700	22	–	10	.688
Boise State	14	–	6	.700	25	–	9	.735
Grand Canyon	11	–	9	.550	13	–	19	.406
Fresno State	8	–	12	.400	15	–	18	.455
Wyoming	7	–	13	.350	10	–	20	.333
Air Force	7	–	13	.350	16	–	19	.457
Nevada	6	–	14	.300	10	–	21	.323
Utah State	2	–	18	.100	6	–	24	.200
San Jose State	2	–	18	.100	4	–	28	.125
† 2026 Mountain West tournament winner

The 2025–26 San Jose State Spartans women's basketball team represents San Jose State University during the 2025–26 NCAA Division I women's basketball season. The Spartans, led by first-year head coach Jonas Chatterton, play their home games at the Provident Credit Union Event Center in San Jose, California, as members of the Mountain West Conference.

== Previous season ==
The Spartans finished the 2024–25 season 10–22, 3–15 in Mountain West play, to finish in a tie for tenth (last) place. They were defeated by Fresno State in the first round of the Mountain West tournament.

On March 24, 2025, it was announced that head coach April Phillips would not be returning as head coach, after three seasons with the team. A month later, April 24, the school announced that they would be hiring Oklahoma associate head coach Jonas Chatterton as the team's new head coach.

== Preseason ==
On October 22, 2025, the Mountain West Conference released their preseason poll. Utah State was picked to finish twelfth (last) in the conference.

=== Preseason rankings ===
MW Preseason Poll
Place	Team	Votes
1	UNLV	281 (19)
2	San Diego State	240 (3)
3	Colorado State	236 (1)
4	Boise State	210 (1)
5	New Mexico	207 (2)
6	Wyoming	194
7	Grand Canyon	177 (1)
8	Air Force	132
9	Fresno State	95
10	Nevada	92
11	Utah State	54
12	San Jose State	44
(#) first-place votes

=== Preseason All-MW Team ===
No players were named to the Preseason All-MW Team.

== Roster ==
2025–26 San Jose State Spartans women's basketball team
Players
Coaches

Pos.	#	Name	Height	Year	Previous school	Hometown
G	0	Katarina Anderson	5 ft 7 in (1.7 m)	Sr	Nipomo High School	Nipomo, California
G	1	Allie Cummins	5 ft 9 in (1.75 m)	Jr	Northern Arizona	Moraga, California
G	2	McKenna Simons	5 ft 10 in (1.78 m)	Sr	Grand Canyon	Overland Park, Kansas
G	3	Mecca Alexander	5 ft 7 in (1.7 m)	So	Cornerstone Christian School	Antioch, California
G	4	Rylei Waugh	5 ft 6 in (1.68 m)	Jr	Pima Community College	Los Angeles, California
F	5	Harisa Mehmedovic	6 ft 1 in (1.85 m)	Jr	Union College	Salt Lake City, Utah
G	8	Amira Brown	5 ft 10 in (1.78 m)	RS Sr	Tulsa	Richmond, California
G/F	10	Amelie Sitterud	6 ft 0 in (1.83 m)	Jr	Loyola Marymount	Kirkland, Washington
G	11	Carla Fuster	5 ft 10 in (1.78 m)	Fr	INS Alba del Vallès	Barcelona, Spain
G/F	15	Maya Anderson	6 ft 1 in (1.85 m)	RS So	Crestwood Preparatory College	Toronto, Ontario
G	20	Briannah McGee	5 ft 7 in (1.7 m)	Jr	Redlands	Murrieta, California
F	22	Kaliyah Dillard	6 ft 0 in (1.83 m)	RS So	Centennial High School	Las Vegas, Nevada
G	23	Stella Sgro	5 ft 11 in (1.8 m)	So	Royal Crown School	Toronto, Ontario
F	32	Gabriela Pato	6 ft 4 in (1.93 m)	Fr	Escola Rosalína De Castro	Vigo, Spain

Head coach

- Jonas Chatterton (Utah)

Assistant coach(es)

- Emily Codding (Oregon State)
- Jaime Gluesing (Florida Gulf Coast)
- Brandon Morrison (UNLV)
- Jordan Moser (Oklahoma)

Legend

- (C) Team captain
- (S) Suspended
- (I) Ineligible
- (W) Walk-on
- Injured
- Current redshirt

Roster
Last update: January 22, 2026

== Schedule and results ==
Date time, TV	Rank^{#}	Opponent^{#}	Result	Record	High points	High rebounds	High assists	Site (attendance) city, state
Exhibition
October 29, 2025*; 7:00 pm		Jessup	W 91–84	–	21 – Tied	11 – Brown	4 – Tied	Provident Credit Union Event Center (344); San Jose, CA
Regular season
November 8, 2025*; 1:00 pm, ESPN+		at BYU	L 57–70	0–1	17 – M. Anderson	8 – M. Anderson	2 – Tied	Marriott Center (1,668); Provo, UT
November 14, 2025*; 5:00 pm, ESPN+		at California Baptist	L 55–69	0–2	12 – Tied	12 – Brown	3 – Cummins	Fowler Events Center (1,029); Riverside, CA
November 19, 2025*; 6:00 pm, MWN		UC Santa Barbara	L 60–75	0–3	12 – M. Anderson	9 – Tied	3 – Tied	Provident Credit Union Event Center (567); San Jose, CA
November 23, 2025*; 2:00 pm, ESPN+		at Pepperdine	L 52–76	0–4	10 – Waugh	6 – Tied	3 – Waugh	Firestone Fieldhouse (321); Malibu, CA
November 28, 2025*; 5:00 pm, ESPN+		at Portland State	L 64−75	0−5	18 – Waugh	8 – Tied	3 – Waugh	Viking Pavilion (289); Portland, OR
December 1, 2025*; 6:00 pm, B1G+		at No. 21 Washington	L 54−80	0−6	11 – Pato	5 – Brown	4 – Waugh	Alaska Airlines Arena (1,960); Seattle, WA
December 4, 2025*; 7:00 pm, NBCSCA/MWN		Saint Mary's	L 53–58	0–7	18 – M. Anderson	10 – Pato	5 – Waugh	Provident Credit Union Event Center (504); San Jose, CA
December 7, 2025*; 2:00 pm, ACCNX		at California	L 42–92	0–8	10 – K. Anderson	7 – Brown	2 – Tied	Haas Pavilion (1,150); Berkeley, CA
December 10, 2025*; 7:00 pm, MWN		Bethesda	Canceled					Provident Credit Union Event Center; San Jose, CA
December 11, 2025*; 7:00 pm, MWN		Cal State Monterey Bay	W 83–40	1–8	18 – M. Anderson	12 – M. Anderson	7 – K. Anderson	Provident Credit Union Event Center (344); San Jose, CA
December 13, 2025*; 2:00 pm, ESPN+		at Cal State Northridge	L 55–66	1–9	13 – M. Anderson	8 – Dillard	4 – K. Anderson	Premier America Credit Union Arena (220); Northridge, CA
December 17, 2025; 5:30 pm, MWN		at Wyoming	L 60−83	1−10 (0–1)	12 – Sgro	7 – Pato	6 – Cummins	Arena-Auditorium (2,369); Laramie, WY
December 21, 2025*; 2:00 pm, NBCSBA/MWN		Sacramento State	W 61–56	2–10	29 – M. Anderson	7 – M. Anderson	4 – K. Anderson	Provident Credit Union Event Center (415); San Jose, CA
December 28, 2025; 2:00 pm, MWN		Grand Canyon	L 59–79	2–11 (0–2)	16 – M. Anderson	9 – M. Anderson	4 – Tied	Provident Credit Union Event Center (306); San Jose, CA
December 31, 2025; 12:00 pm, MWN		at Utah State	L 61–74	2–12 (0–3)	23 – M. Anderson	13 – Brown	4 – Sgro	Smith Spectrum (673); Logan, UT
January 3, 2026; 2:00 pm, MWN		New Mexico	L 51–89	2–13 (0–4)	16 – Brown	9 – M. Anderson	2 – Sgro	Provident Credit Union Event Center (302); San Jose, CA
January 7, 2026; 6:30 pm, MWN		at Fresno State	L 52–67	2–14 (0–5)	11 – Tied	7 – Tied	2 – Fuster	Save Mart Center (917); Fresno, CA
January 10, 2026; 2:00 pm, NBCSBA/MWN		Air Force	L 57–76	2–15 (0–6)	17 – M. Anderson	9 – Tied	3 – Tied	Provident Credit Union Event Center (302); San Jose, CA
January 14, 2026; 7:00 pm, MWN		UNLV	L 50–78	2–16 (0–7)	20 – Cummins	6 – M. Anderson	4 – Tied	Provident Credit Union Event Center (347); San Jose, CA
January 17, 2026; 12:00 pm, MWN		at Colorado State	L 60–75	2–17 (0–8)	22 – Brown	9 – Brown	5 – M. Anderson	Moby Arena (1,670); Fort Collins, CO
January 21, 2026; 7:00 pm, MWN		Nevada	W 60–57	3–17 (1–8)	15 – M. Anderson	9 – Sgro	4 – Sgro	Provident Credit Union Event Center (686); San Jose, CA
January 24, 2026; 1:00 pm, MWN		at San Diego State	L 66–94	3–18 (1–9)	19 – Cummins	8 – Tied	4 – Tied	Viejas Arena (1,701); San Diego, CA
January 31, 2026; 1:00 pm, MWN		at Boise State	L 62–96	3–19 (1–10)	20 – Brown	8 – Pato	3 – Sgro	ExtraMile Arena (2,146); Boise, ID
February 4, 2026; 7:00 pm, MWN		Fresno State	L 50–79	3-20 (1–11)	14 – M. Anderson	9 – M. Anderson	4 – K. Anderson	Provident Credit Union Event Center (313); San Jose, CA
February 7, 2026; 2:00 pm, MWN		San Diego State	L 52–81	3–21 (1–12)	16 – M. Anderson	6 – M. Anderson	3 – Sgro	Provident Credit Union Event Center (633); San Jose, CA
February 11, 2026; 6:00 pm, MWN		at New Mexico	L 61–66	3–22 (1–13)	16 – M. Anderson	5 – Tied	3 – Tied	The Pit (4,204); Albuquerque, NM
February 14, 2026; 12:00 pm, MWN		at Air Force	L 61–77	3–23 (1–14)	16 – M. Anderson	6 – Tied	4 – M. Anderson	Clune Arena (548); Air Force Academy, CO
February 18, 2026; 7:00 pm, MWN		Utah State	W 58–56	4–23 (2–14)	22 – M. Anderson	11 – Dillard	5 – K. Anderson	Provident Credit Union Event Center (327); San Jose, CA
February 21, 2026; 2:00 pm, MWN		Boise State	L 48–71	4–24 (2–15)	20 – M. Anderson	7 – Dillard	4 – K. Anderson	Provident Credit Union Event Center (587); San Jose, CA
February 25, 2026; 6:30 pm, MWN		at Nevada	L 41–49	4–25 (2–16)	15 – M. Anderson	12 – Dillard	4 – M. Anderson	Lawlor Events Center (1,505); Reno, NV
February 28, 2026; 12:00 pm, MWN		at Grand Canyon	L 52–65	4–26 (2–17)	24 – Cummins	10 – Dillard	4 – K. Anderson	Global Credit Union Arena (609); Phoenix, AZ
March 3, 2026; 7:00 pm, MWN		Colorado State	L 44–67	4–27 (2–18)	16 – M. Anderson	15 – M. Anderson	4 – Fuster	Provident Credit Union Event Center (428); San Jose, CA
Mountain West tournament
March 7–10, 2026; 2:30 p.m., MWN	(12)	vs. (5) Boise State; First Round	L 51–68	4–28	18 – M. Anderson	9 – M. Anderson	4 – K. Anderson	Thomas & Mack Center; Paradise, NV
*Non-conference game. ^{#}Rankings from AP Poll. (#) Tournament seedings in parentheses. All times are in Pacific.
