= 2026 Mountain West Conference women's basketball tournament =

American college basketball competition

- Classification: Division I
- Season: 2025–26
- Teams: 12
- Site: Thomas & Mack Center; Paradise, Nevada
- Champions: Colorado State (3rd title)
- Winning coach: Ryun Williams (2nd title)
- Television: Stadium/MWN, CBSSN

2025–26 Mountain West Conference women's basketball standings
	Conf.				Overall
Team	W		L	PCT	W		L	PCT
San Diego State	19	–	1	.950	27	–	6	.818
UNLV	15	–	5	.750	21	–	11	.656
Colorado State †	15	–	5	.750	27	–	8	.771
New Mexico	14	–	6	.700	22	–	10	.688
Boise State	14	–	6	.700	25	–	9	.735
Grand Canyon	11	–	9	.550	13	–	19	.406
Fresno State	8	–	12	.400	15	–	18	.455
Wyoming	7	–	13	.350	10	–	20	.333
Air Force	7	–	13	.350	16	–	19	.457
Nevada	6	–	14	.300	10	–	21	.323
Utah State	2	–	18	.100	6	–	24	.200
San Jose State	2	–	18	.100	4	–	28	.125
† 2026 Mountain West tournament winner

The 2026 Mountain West Conference women's basketball tournament was the postseason women's basketball tournament for the Mountain West Conference. It was held on March 7–10, 2026, at the Thomas & Mack Center on the campus of University of Nevada, Las Vegas, in Paradise, Nevada. The Colorado State Rams won the tournament, their third Mountain West title and second under head coach Ryun Williams. It was the last Mountain West tournament to feature Boise State, Colorado State, Fresno State, San Diego State, and Utah State, all of whom left for the Pac-12 Conference the following offseason, as well as the first to feature new conference member Grand Canyon.

== Seeds ==
All 12 Mountain West schools participated in the tournament. Teams are seeded by conference record with a tiebreaker system to seed teams with identical percentages. The top five teams received byes into the tournament quarterfinals. The remaining teams played in the first round. Tie-breaking procedures remained unchanged since the 2020 tournament.

- Head-to-head record between the tied teams
- Record against the highest-seeded team not involved in the tie, going down through the seedings as necessary
- Higher NET

Seed	School	Conf	Tiebreaker(s)
1	San Diego State	19–1	
2	UNLV	15–5	1–1 vs. Colorado State
3	Colorado State	15–5	1–1 vs. UNLV
4	New Mexico	14–6	1–1 vs. Boise State
5	Boise State	14–6	1–1 vs. New Mexico
6	Grand Canyon	11–9	
7	Fresno State	8–12	
8	Wyoming	7–11	1–1 vs. Air Force
9	Air Force	7–11	1–1 vs. Wyoming
10	Nevada	6–14	
11	Utah State	2–18	1–1 vs. San Jose State
12	San Jose State	2–18	1–1 vs. Utah State

== Schedule ==
Game	Time	Matchup	Score	Television	Attendance
First round – Saturday, March 7
1	12:00 p.m.	No. 8 Wyoming vs No. 9 Air Force	52–60	Stadium/MWN	870
2	2:30 p.m.	No. 5 Boise State vs No. 12 San Jose State	68–51	Stadium/MWN	870
3	5:00 p.m.	No. 7 Fresno State vs No. 10 Nevada	74–57	Stadium/MWN	870
4	7:30 p.m.	No. 6 Grand Canyon vs No. 11 Utah State	75–58	Stadium/MWN	870
Quarterfinals – Sunday, March 8
5	12:00 p.m.	No. 1 San Diego State vs No. 9 Air Force	76–83	Stadium/MWN	1,545
6	2:30 p.m.	No. 4 New Mexico vs No. 5 Boise State	61–62	Stadium/MWN	1,545
7	5:00 p.m.	No. 2 UNLV vs No. 7 Fresno State	79–65	Stadium/MWN	1,545
8	7:30 p.m.	No. 3 Colorado State vs No. 6 Grand Canyon	61–59	Stadium/MWN	1,545
Semifinals – Monday, March 9
9	5:00 p.m.	No. 5 Boise State vs No. 9 Air Force	66–68	Stadium/MWN	909
10	7:30 p.m.	No. 2 UNLV vs No. 3 Colorado State	59–66	Stadium/MWN	909
Championship – Tuesday, March 10
11	6:30 p.m.	No. 3 Colorado State vs No. 9 Air Force	56–42	CBSSN	
Game times in Pacific. Rankings denote tournament seeding.

== Bracket ==
First round Saturday, March 7 Stadium/MWN
8	Wyoming	53
9	Air Force	60
5	Boise State	68
12	San Jose State	51
7	Fresno State	74
10	Nevada	57
6	Grand Canyon	75
11	Utah State	58

Quarterfinals; Sunday, March 8 Stadium/MWN
1	San Diego State	76
9	Air Force	83
4	New Mexico	61
5	Boise State	62
2	UNLV	79
7	Fresno State	65
3	Colorado State	61
6	Grand Canyon	59

Semifinals; Monday, March 9 Stadium/MWN
9	Air Force	68
5	Boise State	66
2	UNLV	59
3	Colorado State	66

Championship; Tuesday, March 10; CBSSN
9	Air Force	42
3	Colorado State	56
