= 2025–26 Saint Mary's Gaels women's basketball team =

American college basketball season

2025–26 Saint Mary's Gaels women's basketball
- Conference: West Coast Conference
- Record: 15–17 (6–12 WCC)
- Head coach: Jeff Cammon (3rd season)
- Assistant coaches: Kevin Adams; Lexi Petersen; Brendan Wheeler; Brittany Boyd-Jones
- Home arena: University Credit Union Pavilion

2025–26 West Coast Conference women's basketball standings
	Conf.				Overall
Team	W		L	PCT	W		L	PCT
Loyola Marymount	15	–	3	.833	21	–	9	.700
Gonzaga †	14	–	4	.778	24	–	9	.727
Santa Clara	13	–	5	.722	24	–	9	.727
Oregon State	13	–	5	.722	23	–	11	.676
Portland	11	–	7	.611	18	–	14	.563
Pepperdine	10	–	8	.556	19	–	12	.613
San Francisco	9	–	9	.500	18	–	14	.563
Pacific	6	–	12	.333	11	–	19	.367
Washington State	6	–	12	.333	9	–	25	.265
Saint Mary's	6	–	12	.333	15	–	17	.469
San Diego	4	–	14	.222	11	–	22	.333
Seattle	1	–	17	.056	5	–	25	.167
† 2026 WCC tournament winner As of March 10, 2026

The 2025–26 Saint Mary's Gaels women's basketball team represents Saint Mary's College of California during the 2025–26 NCAA Division I women's basketball season. The Gaels, led by third-year head coach Jeff Cammon, play their home games at the University Credit Union Pavilion in Moraga, California, as members of the West Coast Conference.

== Previous season ==
The Gaels finished the 2024–25 season 14–17, 10–10 in WCC play, to finish in sixth place. They were defeated by Pacific in the third round of the WCC tournament. They received an at-large bid to the WNIT, where they would be defeated by Texas Southern in the first round.

== Preseason ==
On October 23, 2025, the West Coast Conference released their preseason poll. Saint Mary's was picked to finish seventh in the conference.

=== Preseason rankings ===
WCC Preseason Poll
Place	Team	Votes
1	Oregon State	119 (9)
2	Gonzaga	111 (3)
3	Washington State	94
4	Portland	91
5	Santa Clara	84
6	San Francisco	70
7	Saint Mary's	55
8	Pacific	52
9	Loyola Marymount	38
10	Pepperdine	36
11	San Diego	31
12	Seattle	11
(#) first-place votes

=== Preseason All-WCC Team ===
No players were named to the Preseason All-WCC Team.

== Roster ==
2025–26 Saint Mary's Gaels women's basketball team
Players
Coaches

Pos.	#	Name	Height	Year	Previous school	Hometown
G	0	Jada Hunter	5 ft 10 in (1.78 m)	Jr	Laney College	Vallejo, California
G	2	Amy Kurkowski	6 ft 1 in (1.85 m)	So	Emmanuel College	Melbourne, Australia
G	3	Mauriana Hashemian-Orr	5 ft 7 in (1.7 m)	So	Benson Tech High School	Portland, Oregon
G	4	Charlece Ohiaeri	6 ft 1 in (1.85 m)	Jr	DePaul	Las Vegas, Nevada
F	5	Abigail Shoff	6 ft 0 in (1.83 m)	Jr	Long Beach State	Redding, California
PF	7	Edie Clarke	6 ft 4 in (1.93 m)	So	Geelong High School	Melbourne, Australia
G	8	Emily Foy	6 ft 1 in (1.85 m)	Jr	St Francis Xavier College	Newcastle, Australia
F	10	Georgia Grigoropoulou	6 ft 3 in (1.91 m)	Sr	Santa Clara	Athens, Greece
G	11	Coco Urlacher	5 ft 10 in (1.78 m)	Fr	Fremd High School	Palatine, Illinois
G	13	Malia Latu	5 ft 8 in (1.73 m)	GS	Santa Clara	East Palo Alto, California
PF	22	Melesungu Afeaki	6 ft 2 in (1.88 m)	Sr	San Diego	San Bruno, California
G	23	Addi Wedin	5 ft 10 in (1.78 m)	RS Jr	La Salle Catholic College Prep	Happy Valley, Oregon
PG	24	Colleena Bryant	5 ft 7 in (1.7 m)	Fr	Wayne Memorial High School	Detroit, Michigan
G	33	Ella Wedin	6 ft 1 in (1.85 m)	RS So	Loyola Marymount	Happy Valley, Oregon

Head coach

- Jeff Cammon (Alcorn State)

Assistant coach(es)

- Kevin Adams (Cal Baptist)
- Lexi Petersen (Oregon)
- Brendan Wheeler (Cal State Northridge)
- Brittany Boyd-Jones (California)

Legend

- (C) Team captain
- (S) Suspended
- (I) Ineligible
- (W) Walk-on
- Injured
- Current redshirt

Roster
Last update: January 12, 2026

== Schedule and results ==
Date time, TV	Rank^{#}	Opponent^{#}	Result	Record	High points	High rebounds	High assists	Site (attendance) city, state
Non-conference regular season
November 4, 2025*; 5:30 pm, MWN		at Wyoming	W 56–47	1–0	13 – A. Wedin	5 – Hunter	2 – Tied	Arena-Auditorium (1,970); Laramie, WY
November 7, 2025*; 4:00 pm, ESPN+		Chico State	W 67–49	2–0	13 – Clarke	6 – Tied	4 – Tied	University Credit Union Pavilion (324); Moraga, CA
November 9, 2025*; 2:00 pm, ESPN+		San Francisco State	W 77–38	3–0	14 – E. Wedin	7 – Tied	5 – Hashemian-Orr	University Credit Union Pavilion (275); Moraga, CA
November 14, 2025*; 6:00 pm, ESPN+		at UC Riverside	W 51–41	4–0	9 – A. Wedin	5 – Tied	3 – Hashemian-Orr	SRC Arena (178); Riverside, CA
November 16, 2025*; 2:00 pm, ESPN+		Nevada	W 56–50	5–0	16 – Clarke	5 – Tied	4 – Hashemian-Orr	University Credit Union Pavilion (287); Moraga, CA
November 20, 2025*; 11:30 am, ACCNX		at California	L 62−70	5−1	12 – Foy	8 – Clarke	4 – Clarke	Haas Pavilion (4,624); Berkeley, CA
November 25, 2025*; 11:30 am, FloSports		vs. Oregon; Hoopfest Challenge	L 53−71	5−2	14 – Clarke	5 – Clarke	5 – Latu	Comerica Center (257); Frisco, TX
November 26, 2025*; 11:30 am, FloSports		vs. North Texas; Hoopfest Challenge	L 65–67 ^{2OT}	5–3	16 – A. Wedin	8 – Tied	4 – Hashemian-Orr	Comerica Center (223); Frisco, TX
December 2, 2025*; 7:00 pm, B1G+		at No. 16 USC	L 33–79	5–4	8 – Clarke	6 – Clarke	2 – Tied	Galen Center (2,361); Los Angeles, CA
December 4, 2025*; 7:00 pm, MWN		at San Jose State	W 58–53	6–4	16 – Foy	7 – Clarke	4 – Hashemian-Orr	Provident Credit Union Event Center (504); San Jose, CA
December 7, 2025*; 12:00 pm, MWN		at Grand Canyon	W 62–54	7–4	18 – Latu	6 – Clarke	4 – Hunter	Global Credit Union Arena (487); Phoenix, AZ
December 10, 2025*; 6:30 pm, ESPN+		Fresno State	W 60–57	8–4	17 – A. Wedin	8 – Latu	5 – Tied	University Credit Union Pavilion (329); Moraga, CA
December 20, 2025*; 2:00 pm, ESPN+		New Mexico State	W 70–59	9–4	14 – Shoff	6 – Shoff	4 – Tied	University Credit Union Pavilion (336); Moraga, CA
WCC regular season
December 28, 2025; 2:00 pm, ESPN+		Portland	L 59–63	9–5 (0–1)	18 – Clarke	7 – Clarke	5 – Hashemian-Orr	University Credit Union Pavilion (408); Moraga, CA
December 30, 2025; 5:00 pm, ESPN+		Oregon State	L 57–63	9–6 (0–2)	15 – Foy	6 – Clarke	3 – Tied	University Credit Union Pavilion (326); Moraga, CA
January 2, 2026; 6:00 pm, ESPN+		at Pepperdine	L 52–60	9–7 (0–3)	10 – Clarke	8 – Clarke	4 – Hashemian-Orr	Firestone Fieldhouse (318); Malibu, CA
January 4, 2026; 2:00 pm, ESPN+		at San Diego	W 57–49	10–7 (1–3)	10 – Tied	6 – Clarke	3 – Tied	Jenny Craig Pavilion (349); San Diego, CA
January 8, 2026; 6:00 pm, ESPN+		at Pacific	W 60–55	11–7 (2–3)	12 – Tied	8 – Shoff	5 – Tied	Alex G. Spanos Center (382); Stockton, CA
January 15, 2026; 6:30 pm, ESPN+		Washington State	L 64-68 ^{OT}	11-8 (2-4)	18 – Shoff	6 – Clarke	6 – Hashemian-Orr	University Credit Union Pavilion (287); Moraga, CA
January 17, 2026; 5:00 pm, ESPN+		Santa Clara	L 63-68	11-9 (2-5)	15 – Hunter	9 – Latu	4 – Latu	University Credit Union Pavilion (486); Moraga, CA
January 22, 2026; 6:30 pm, ESPN+		Pepperdine	W 53-51	12-9 (3-5)	16 – Clarke	4 – Tied	5 – Hashemian-Orr	University Credit Union Pavilion (424); Moraga, CA
January 24, 2026; 1:00 pm, ESPN+		at Seattle	W 67-53	13-9 (4-5)	11 – Wedin	5 – Shoff	5 – Hunter	Redhawk Center (326); Seattle, WA
January 29, 2026; 6:00 pm, ESPN+		at Portland	L 42-68		14 – Shoff	8 – Shoff	3 – Hunter	Chiles Center (618); Portland, OR
February 5, 2026; 6:30 pm, ESPN+		Loyola Marymount	L 69-75	13-11 (4-7)	18 – Shoff	4 – Tied	6 – Hashemian-Orr	University Credit Union Pavilion (378); Moraga, CA
February 7, 2026; 2:00 pm, ESPN+		at San Francisco	W 72-55	14-11 (5-7)	12 – Latu	7 – Shoff	4 – Hashemian-Orr	Sobrato Center (219); San Francisco, CA
February 12, 2026; 6:30 pm, ESPN+		Pacific	L 53-56	14-12 (5-8)	19 – Shoff	8 – Clarke	2 – Tied	University Credit Union Pavilion (367); Moraga, CA
February 16, 2026; 1:00 pm, ESPN+		Seattle	W 86-59	15-12 (6-8)	13 – Shoff	7 – Clarke	6 – Hunter	University Credit Union Pavilion (198); Moraga, CA
February 19, 2026; 6:00 pm, ESPN+		at Santa Clara	L 55-63	15-13 (6-9)	14 – Shoff	8 – Tied	2 – Tied	Leavey Center (1,178); Santa Clara, CA
February 21, 2026; 5:00 pm, ESPN+		San Francisco	L 60–61	15–14 (6–10)	19 – Shoff	6 – Tied	6 – Latu	University Credit Union Pavilion (639); Moraga, CA
February 26, 2026; 6:00 pm, ESPN+		at Gonzaga	L 67–75	15–15 (6–11)	21 – Wedin	5 – Tied	5 – Clarke	McCarthey Athletic Center (5,231); Spokane, WA
February 28, 2026; 12:00 pm, ESPN+		at Washington State	L 50-57	15-16 (6-12)	11 – Afeaki	6 – Shoff	2 – Shoff	Beasley Coliseum (1,215); Pullman, WA
WCC tournament
March 5, 2026; 2:30 pm, ESPN+	(10)	vs. (11) San Diego; First Round	L 62-66	15-17	19 – Latu	11 – Clarke	4 – Clarke	Orleans Arena (708); Paradise, NV
*Non-conference game. ^{#}Rankings from AP Poll. (#) Tournament seedings in parentheses. All times are in Pacific.
