= 2025–26 Santa Clara Broncos women's basketball team =

American college basketball season

2025–26 Santa Clara Broncos women's basketball

WBIT, First Round
- Conference: West Coast Conference
- Record: 24–10 (13–5 WCC)
- Head coach: Loree Payne (1st season)
- Associate head coach: TJ Harris
- Assistant coaches: Kellee Barney; Ryan Freeman; Des Abeyta
- Home arena: Leavey Center

2025–26 West Coast Conference women's basketball standings
	Conf.				Overall
Team	W		L	PCT	W		L	PCT
Loyola Marymount	15	–	3	.833	21	–	10	.677
Gonzaga †	14	–	4	.778	24	–	10	.706
Santa Clara	13	–	5	.722	24	–	10	.706
Oregon State	13	–	5	.722	23	–	12	.657
Portland	11	–	7	.611	20	–	14	.588
Pepperdine	10	–	8	.556	21	–	12	.636
San Francisco	9	–	9	.500	19	–	15	.559
Pacific	6	–	12	.333	11	–	19	.367
Washington State	6	–	12	.333	9	–	25	.265
Saint Mary's	6	–	12	.333	15	–	17	.469
San Diego	4	–	14	.222	11	–	22	.333
Seattle	1	–	17	.056	5	–	25	.167
† 2026 WCC tournament winner As of March 20, 2026

The 2025–26 Santa Clara Broncos women's basketball team represents Santa Clara University during the 2025–26 NCAA Division I women's basketball season. The Broncos, led by first-year head coach Loree Payne, play their home games at the Leavey Center in Santa Clara, California, as members of the West Coast Conference.

== Previous season ==
The Broncos finished the 2024–25 season 14–17, 8–12 in WCC play, to finish in eighth place. They were defeated by Loyola Marymount in the second round of the WCC tournament.

Prior to the season, on October 12, 2024, head coach Bill Carr announced his resignation, ending his eight-year tenure with the team, with associate head coach Michael Floyd being named interim head coach for the 2024–25 season. On March 24, 2025, it was announced that the school would be hiring Northern Arizona head coach Loree Payne as the team's new head coach.

== Preseason ==
On October 23, 2025, the West Coast Conference released their preseason poll. Santa Clara was picked to finish fifth in the conference.

=== Preseason rankings ===
WCC Preseason Poll
Place	Team	Votes
1	Oregon State	119 (9)
2	Gonzaga	111 (3)
3	Washington State	94
4	Portland	91
5	Santa Clara	84
6	San Francisco	70
7	Saint Mary's	55
8	Pacific	52
9	Loyola Marymount	38
10	Pepperdine	36
11	San Diego	31
12	Seattle	11
(#) first-place votes

=== Preseason All-WCC Team ===
Preseason All-WCC Team
Player	Year	Position
Sophie Glancey	Graduate Student	Forward
Maia Jones	Junior	Guard

== Roster ==
2025–26 Santa Clara Broncos women's basketball team
Players
Coaches

Pos.	#	Name	Height	Year	Previous school	Hometown
G	0	Maia Jones	5 ft 10 in (1.78 m)	RS Jr	Saint Mary's	Tasman, New Zealand
G	2	Aniya Hooker	5 ft 8 in (1.73 m)	So	Siena	Lynnwood, Washington
G	3	Kate Schat	5 ft 9 in (1.75 m)	Fr	Cardinal Newman High School	Redwood Valley, California
G	4	Maddy Warberg	5 ft 11 in (1.8 m)	Fr	South Medford High School	Eugene, Oregon
G	5	Sara Schmerbach	5 ft 11 in (1.8 m)	Fr	South Medford High School	South Medford, Oregon
G	6	Sienna Grieger	5 ft 9 in (1.75 m)	Fr	St Michael's College	West Adelaide, Australia
F	10	Lauren Grover	6 ft 1 in (1.85 m)	Sr	Santiago High School	Corona, California
F	11	Alana Goodchild	6 ft 2 in (1.88 m)	Sr	Northwestern	Sydney, Australia
F	12	Sophie Glancey	6 ft 2 in (1.88 m)	GS	Northern Arizona	Boise, Idaho
F	13	Ava Schmidt	6 ft 2 in (1.88 m)	Jr	Northern Arizona	Sammamish, Washington
G	20	Delainey Miller	5 ft 10 in (1.78 m)	Fr	Cherokee Trail High School	Aurora, Colorado
G	23	Ashley Hawkins	5 ft 6 in (1.68 m)	GS	Gardner–Webb	Long Beach, California
G	24	Reilly Clark	5 ft 10 in (1.78 m)	RS So	Northern Arizona	Tucson, Arizona
F	30	Kylee Fox	5 ft 11 in (1.8 m)	Jr	Fresno State	Richland, Washington
F	34	Tyler Gildersleeve-Stiles	6 ft 1 in (1.85 m)	Fr	Snohomish High School	Snohomish, Washington

Head coach

- Loree Payne (Washington)

Assistant coach(es)

- TJ Harris (Great Falls)
- Kellee Barney (Idaho)
- Ryan Freeman (Florida)
- Des Abeyta (UC Davis)

Legend

- (C) Team captain
- (S) Suspended
- (I) Ineligible
- (W) Walk-on
- Injured
- Current redshirt

Roster
Last update: January 8, 2026

== Schedule and results ==
Date time, TV	Rank^{#}	Opponent^{#}	Result	Record	High points	High rebounds	High assists	Site (attendance) city, state
Non-conference regular season
November 3, 2025*; 6:00 pm, ESPN+		Stanislaus State	W 108–52	1–0	18 – Fox	11 – Tied	6 – Hawkins	Leavey Center (321); Santa Clara, CA
November 6, 2025*; 7:00 pm, ACCNX		at Stanford	L 58–79	1–1	16 – Jones	6 – Glancey	5 – Hawkins	Maples Pavilion (2,289); Stanford, CA
November 11, 2025*; 5:00 pm, ESPN+		at Texas A&M–Corpus Christi	W 85–62	2–1	20 – Glancey	5 – Tied	6 – Hawkins	Dugan Wellness Center (994); Corpus Christi, TX
November 14, 2025*; 6:00 pm, ESPN+		Wyoming	W 76–45	3–1	13 – Tied	10 – Tied	8 – Hawkins	Leavey Center (415); Santa Clara, CA
November 16, 2025*; 1:00 pm, ESPN+		Arizona State	L 77–82	3–2	20 – Jones	8 – Glancey	6 – Hawkins	Leavey Center (448); Santa Clara, CA
November 19, 2025*; 11:00 am, MWN		at San Diego State	W 72−47	4−2	25 – Jones	9 – Tied	4 – Tied	Viejas Arena (3,707); San Diego, CA
November 23, 2025*; 1:00 pm, ESPN+		Fresno State	W 81−63	5−2	17 – Glancey	12 – Glancey	6 – Hawkins	Leavey Center (283); Santa Clara, CA
November 28, 2025*; 2:00 pm		vs. Lindenwood; Rainbow Wahine Showdown	W 84–70	6–2	24 – Glancey	12 – Schmidt	5 – Hawkins	Stan Sheriff Center (103); Honolulu, HI
November 29, 2025*; 2:00 pm		vs. Vermont; Rainbow Wahine Showdown	L 51–63	6–3	15 – Jones	8 – Fox	4 – Hawkins	Stan Sheriff Center (100); Honolulu, HI
November 30, 2025*; 4:30 pm, ESPN+		at Hawai'i; Rainbow Wahine Showdown	W 76–57	7–3	19 – Glancey	12 – Glancey	5 – Jones	Stan Sheriff Center (1,594); Honolulu, HI
December 6, 2025*; 1:00 pm, ESPN+		Simpson	W 125–43	8–3	22 – Jones	13 – Tied	6 – Hawkins	Leavey Center (640); Santa Clara, CA
December 14, 2025*; 12:00 pm, MWN		at Grand Canyon	W 91–72	9–3	29 – Glancey	8 – Glancey	9 – Hawkins	Global Credit Union Arena (602); Phoenix, AZ
December 21, 2025*; 12:00 pm, ESPN+		at North Texas	W 84–72	10–3	23 – Fox	13 – Glancey	11 – Hawkins	The Super Pit (1,206); Denton, TX
WCC regular season
December 28, 2025; 1:00 pm, ESPN+		San Diego	W 68–46	11–3 (1–0)	14 – Schat	8 – Tied	5 – Tied	Leavey Center (356); Santa Clara, CA
December 30, 2025; 6:00 pm, ESPN+		Seattle	W 94–65	12–3 (2–0)	22 – Glancey	8 – Gildersleeve-Stiles	7 – Hawkins	Leavey Center (331); Santa Clara, CA
January 2, 2026; 6:00 pm, ESPN+		at LMU	L 85–92	12–4 (2–1)	20 – Glancey	5 – Jones	6 – Hawkins	Gersten Pavilion (303); Los Angeles, CA
January 4, 2026; 12:00 pm, ESPN+		Gonzaga	W 77–73	13–4 (3–1)	17 – Tied	8 – Glancey	11 – Hawkins	Leavey Center (376); Santa Clara, CA
January 8, 2026; 6:00 pm, ESPN+		at San Francisco	W 77-67	14-4 (4-1)	25 – Jones	8 – Glancey	4 – Hawkins	Sobrato Center (257); San Francisco, CA
January 10, 2026; 12:00 pm, ESPN+		at Washington State	W 98-92	15-4 (5-1)	26 – Hawkins	6 – Tied	8 – Hawkins	Beasley Coliseum (883); Pullman, WA
January 15, 2026; 6:00 pm, ESPN+		Portland	L 66-73	15-5 (5-2)	15 – Hawkins	11 – Schmidt	8 – Hawkins	Leavey Center (346); Santa Clara, CA
January 17, 2026; 5:00 pm, ESPN+		at Saint Mary's	W 68-63	16-5 (6-2)	17 – Tied	9 – Miller	3 – Tied	University Credit Union Pavilion (486); Moraga, CA
January 22, 2026; 6:00 pm, ESPN+		at Seattle	W 93-59	17-5 (7-2)	19 – Miller	9 – Miller	4 – Hawkins	Redhawk Center (483); Seattle, WA
January 29, 2026; 6:00 pm, ESPN+		Washington State	W 102-71	18-5 (8-2)	20 – Hawkins	7 – Miller	7 – Hawkins	Leavey Center (441); Santa Clara, CA
January 31, 2026; 1:00 pm, ESPN+		Pepperdine	L 72-74	18-6 (8-3)	21 – Hawkins	7 – Tied	4 – Tied	Leavey Center (1,952); Santa Clara, CA
February 5, 2026; 6:00 pm, ESPN+		at Pacific	L 82-90	18-7 (8-4)	24 – Jones	11 – Fox	6 – Hawkins	Alex G. Spanos Center (617); Stockton, CA
February 12, 2026; 6:00 pm, ESPN+		at Oregon State	W 83-70	19-7 (9-4)	25 – Schmidt	10 – Schmidt	9 – Hawkins	Gill Coliseum (3,949); Corvallis, OR
February 14, 2026; 5:00 pm, ESPN+		at Portland	W 77-66	20-7 (10-4)	21 – Miller	8 – Miller	7 – Hawkins	Chiles Center (881); Portland, OR
February 19, 2026; 6:00 pm, ESPN+		Saint Mary's	W 63-55	21-7 (11-4)	14 – Tied	7 – Gildersleeve-Stiles	7 – Hawkins	Leavey Center (1,178); Santa Clara, CA
February 21, 2026; 2:00 pm, ESPN+		at Pepperdine	L 63-80	21-8 (11-5)	17 – Schmidt	6 – Miller	5 – Hawkins	Firestone Fieldhouse (411); Malibu, CA
February 26, 2026; 6:00 pm, ESPN+		Pacific	W 87-79	22-8 (12-5)	19 – Tied	8 – Tied	9 – Hawkins	Leavey Center (370); Santa Clara, CA
February 28, 2026; 12:00 pm, ESPN+		San Francisco	W 90-82 ^{OT}	23-8 (13-5)	29 – Jones	5 – Tied	11 – Hawkins	Leavey Center (455); Santa Clara, CA
WCC tournament
March 8, 2026; 2:00 pm, ESPN+	(3)	vs. (7) San Francisco; Quarterfinal	W 87-69	24-8	28 – Jones	8 – Miller	6 – Hawkins	Orleans Arena (1,811); Paradise, NV
March 9, 2026; 2:30 pm, ESPN+	(3)	vs. (2) Gonzaga; Semifinal	L 60-88	24-9	17 – Hawkins	8 – Miller	3 – Hawkins	Orleans Arena (3,359); Paradise, NV
WBIT
March 19, 2026*; 7:00 pm, ESPN+		at (3) California; First Round	L 68–72	24–10	18 – Tied	8 – Gildersleeve-Stiles	4 – Miller	Haas Pavilion (665); Berkeley, CA
*Non-conference game. ^{#}Rankings from AP Poll. (#) Tournament seedings in parentheses. All times are in Pacific.
