= 2025–26 Gonzaga Bulldogs women's basketball team =

American college basketball season

2025–26 Gonzaga Bulldogs women's basketball

WCC Tournament champions

NCAA Tournament, First Round
- Conference: West Coast Conference
- Record: 24–10 (14–4 WCC)
- Head coach: Lisa Fortier (12th season)
- Assistant coaches: Jordan Green; Stacy Clinesmith; Craig Fortier; Chantel Osahor; Jazmine Redmon
- Home arena: McCarthey Athletic Center

2025–26 West Coast Conference women's basketball standings
	Conf.				Overall
Team	W		L	PCT	W		L	PCT
Loyola Marymount	15	–	3	.833	21	–	10	.677
Gonzaga †	14	–	4	.778	24	–	10	.706
Santa Clara	13	–	5	.722	24	–	10	.706
Oregon State	13	–	5	.722	23	–	12	.657
Portland	11	–	7	.611	20	–	15	.571
Pepperdine	10	–	8	.556	21	–	13	.618
San Francisco	9	–	9	.500	19	–	15	.559
Pacific	6	–	12	.333	11	–	19	.367
Washington State	6	–	12	.333	9	–	25	.265
Saint Mary's	6	–	12	.333	15	–	17	.469
San Diego	4	–	14	.222	11	–	22	.333
Seattle	1	–	17	.056	5	–	25	.167
† 2026 WCC tournament winner

The 2025–26 Gonzaga Bulldogs women's basketball team represents Gonzaga University during the 2025–26 NCAA Division I women's basketball season. The Bulldogs, led by 12th-year head coach Lisa Fortier, play their home games at the McCarthey Athletic Center in Spokane, Washington, as members of the West Coast Conference.

This season will mark Gonzaga's last season as members of the West Coast Conference, as they will be joining the newly reformed Pac-12 Conference, effective July 1, 2026.

== Previous season ==
The Bulldogs finished the 2024–25 season 24–11, 17–3 in WCC play, to finish as WCC regular season co-champions, alongside Portland. They were upset by eventual tournament champions Oregon State in the semifinals of the WCC tournament. They received an automatic bid to the WBIT, where they would defeated UTSA in the first round and Colorado in the second round, before falling to eventual tournament champions Minnesota in the quarterfinals.

== Offseason ==
=== Departures ===
Due to COVID-19 disruptions throughout NCAA sports in 2020–21, the NCAA announced that the 2020–21 season would not count against the athletic eligibility of any individual involved in an NCAA winter sport, including women's basketball. This meant that all seniors in 2023–24 had the option to return for 2024–25.

Name	Number	Pos.	Height	Year	Hometown	Reason left
Esther Little	0	F	6'2"	(redshirt) Senior	Ipswich, England	Graduated
Claire O'Connor	4	G	6'0"	Sophomore	Bellevue, WA	Transferred to Colorado
Maud Huijbens	5	G	6'3"	Senior	Hilversum, Netherlands	Graduated
Tayla Dalton	10	G	5'9"	Graduate Student	Auckland, New Zealand	Graduated
Yvonne Ejim	15	F	6'1"	Graduate Student	Calgary, AB	Graduated/2025 WNBA draft; selected 33rd overall by Indiana Fever
Ella Hopkins	31	F	6'3"	(redshirt) Freshman	Rochester, MN	Walk-on; TBD
Bree Salenbien	35	G	6'2"	(redshirt) Junior	Adrian, MI	Transferred to Ball State

=== Incoming transfers ===
Name	Number	Pos.	Height	Year	Hometown	Previous school
Sierra Lichtie	4	F	6'0"	Graduate Student	Riverton, UT	Cal Poly
Taylor Smith	20	F	6'2"	Junior	Pocatello, ID	Weber State
Teryn Gardner	24	G	5'9"	Sophomore	Spokane, WA	Boise State
Zeryhia Aokuso	55	G	5'10"	Junior	Amarillo, TX	Saint Mary's

==== Recruiting ====
There was no recruiting class of 2025.

== Preseason ==
On October 23, 2025, the West Coast Conference released their preseason poll. Gonzaga was picked to finish second in the conference, receiving three of the twelve first-place votes.

=== Preseason rankings ===
WCC Preseason Poll
Place	Team	Votes
1	Oregon State	119 (9)
2	Gonzaga	111 (3)
3	Washington State	94
4	Portland	91
5	Santa Clara	84
6	San Francisco	70
7	Saint Mary's	55
8	Pacific	52
9	Loyola Marymount	38
10	Pepperdine	36
11	San Diego	31
12	Seattle	11
(#) first-place votes

=== Preseason All-WCC Team ===
Preseason All-WCC Team
Player	Year	Position
Zeryhia Aokuso	Junior	Guard
Allie Turner	Sophomore	Guard

== Roster ==
2025–26 Gonzaga Bulldogs women's basketball team
Players
Coaches

Pos.	#	Name	Height	Year	Previous school	Hometown
G	1	Paige Lofing	5 ft 9 in (1.75 m)	Fr	Huntley Project High School	Billings, Montana
G	2	Vera Gunaydin	5 ft 9 in (1.75 m)	Sr	South Georgia Tech	Ankara, Turkey
G	3	Julia Wilson	5 ft 10 in (1.78 m)	Fr	Rancho Christian School	Temecula, California
F	4	Sierra Lichtie	6 ft 0 in (1.83 m)	GS	Cal Poly	Riverton, Utah
G	8	Inês Bettencourt	5 ft 9 in (1.75 m)	Sr	UConn	São Miguel, Portugal
G	11	Allie Turner	5 ft 8 in (1.73 m)	So	John Burroughs School	St. Louis, Missouri
G	12	Christabel Osarobo	5 ft 11 in (1.8 m)	So	Ipswich Basketball Academy	Tudela, Spain
F	20	Taylor Smith	6 ft 2 in (1.88 m)	Jr	Weber State	Pocatello, Idaho
F	22	McKynnlie Dalan	6 ft 0 in (1.83 m)	Jr	Minnesota	Montesano, Washington
F	23	Jaiden Haile	6 ft 2 in (1.88 m)	Fr	West Fargo Horace High School	Fargo, North Dakota
G	24	Teryn Gardner	5 ft 10 in (1.78 m)	So	Boise State	Spokane, Washington
F	33	Lauren Whittaker	6 ft 3 in (1.91 m)	RS Fr	St Andrew's College	Canterbury, New Zealand
G	55	Zeryhia Aokuso	5 ft 10 in (1.78 m)	Jr	Saint Mary's	Amarillo, Texas

Head coach

- Lisa Fortier (Cal State Monterey Bay)

Assistant coach(es)

- Jordan Green (George Fox)
- Stacy Clinesmith (UC Santa Barbara)
- Craig Fortier (Cal State Monterey Bay)
- Chantel Osahor (Washington)
- Jazmine Redmon (Gonzaga)

Legend

- (C) Team captain
- (S) Suspended
- (I) Ineligible
- (W) Walk-on
- Injured
- Current redshirt

Roster
Last update: January 9, 2026

== Schedule and results ==
Date time, TV	Rank^{#}	Opponent^{#}	Result	Record	High points	High rebounds	High assists	Site (attendance) city, state
Exhibition
November 2, 2025*; 2:00 pm		Carroll	W 91–31	–	20 – Smith	–	–	McCarthey Athletic Center; Spokane, WA
Non-conference regular season
November 7, 2025*; 5:00 pm, SLN		at North Dakota State	W 81–66	1–0	18 – Turner	9 – Whittaker	4 – Bettencourt	Scheels Center (1,906); Fargo, ND
November 9, 2025*; 11:30 am, CBSSN		at Toledo	W 72–69	2–0	16 – Tied	6 – Whittaker	5 – Turner	Savage Arena (4,127); Toledo, OH
November 13, 2025*; 6:00 pm, ESPN+		Colorado State	L 66–70	2–1	29 – Whittaker	7 – Whittaker	4 – Turner	McCarthey Athletic Center (4,936); Spokane, WA
November 16, 2025*; 2:00 pm, SWX/ESPN+		Stanford	L 52–65	2–2	14 – Turner	6 – Tied	6 – Turner	McCarthey Athletic Center (5,584); Spokane, WA
November 20, 2025*; 5:00 pm, Midco Sports		vs. South Dakota State	L 63–72	2–3	19 – Turner	13 – Whittaker	4 – Wilson	Sanford Pentagon (2,136); Sioux Falls, SD
November 23, 2025*; 2:00 pm, SWX/ESPN+		Eastern Washington	W 79–60	3–3	21 – Whittaker	9 – Haile	6 – Bettencourt	McCarthey Athletic Center (5,018); Spokane, WA
November 28, 2025*; 10:30 am, FloSports		vs. Indiana; Coconut Hoops Blue Heron Division semifinals	L 72–76	3–4	27 – Whittaker	9 – Haile	5 – Bettencourt	Alico Arena (761); Fort Myers, FL
November 30, 2025*; 8:00 am, FloSports		vs. Marquette; Coconut Hoops Blue Heron Division consolation	W 65–61	4–4	23 – Whittaker	13 – Whittaker	4 – Tied	Alico Arena (252); Fort Myers, FL
December 4, 2025*; 6:00 pm, SWX/ESPN+		Grand Canyon	W 62–58	5–4	24 – Whittaker	13 – Whittaker	4 – Turner	McCarthey Athletic Center (4,588); Spokane, WA
December 6, 2025*; 6:00 pm, ESPN+		UC Davis	W 83–72	6–4	19 – Whittaker	5 – Tied	6 – Tied	McCarthey Athletic Center (4,686); Spokane, WA
December 16, 2025*; 6:00 pm, SWX/ESPN+		Arizona State	L 66–68	6–5	24 – Whittaker	9 – Whittaker	5 – Smith	McCarthey Athletic Center (4,742); Spokane, WA
December 19, 2025*; 4:30 pm, ESPN+		at Missouri State	W 68–49	7–5	19 – Whittaker	16 – Whittaker	6 – Aokuso	Great Southern Bank Arena (1,801); Springfield, MO
December 21, 2025*; 2:00 pm, ESPN+		at UC Riverside	W 68–62	8–5	18 – Turner	13 – Whittaker	7 – Smith	SRC Arena (149); Riverside, CA
WCC regular season
December 28, 2025; 2:00 pm, SWX/ESPN+		Loyola Marymount	W 87–80 ^{2OT}	9–5 (1–0)	20 – Turner	16 – Whittaker	6 – Turner	McCarthey Athletic Center (5,179); Spokane, WA
December 30, 2025; 6:00 pm, ESPN+		Pepperdine	W 75–52	10–5 (2–0)	22 – Whittaker	12 – Haile	4 – Tied	McCarthey Athletic Center (4,980); Spokane, WA
January 2, 2026; 6:00 pm, ESPN+		at Seattle	W 85–59	11–5 (3–0)	16 – Tied	10 – Whittaker	8 – Turner	Redhawk Center (541); Seattle, WA
January 4, 2026; 12:00 pm, ESPN+		at Santa Clara	L 73–77	11–6 (3–1)	21 – Whittaker	13 – Whittaker	3 – Turner	Leavey Center (376); Santa Clara, CA
January 10, 2026; 2:00 pm, SWX/ESPN+		Portland	W 69–55	12–6 (4–1)	22 – Whittaker	10 – Whittaker	5 – Smith	McCarthey Athletic Center (5,713); Spokane, WA
January 15, 2026; 6:00 pm, ESPN+		San Francisco	W 82–69	13–6 (5–1)	26 – Whittaker	11 – Whittaker	5 – Turner	McCarthey Athletic Center (4,765); Spokane, WA
January 17, 2026; 2:00 pm, ESPN+		San Diego	W 87–42	14–6 (6–1)	12 – Gardner	13 – Whittaker	6 – Turner	McCarthey Athletic Center (5,166); Spokane, WA
January 22, 2026; 6:00 pm, ESPN+		at Oregon State	L 87–92 ^{OT}	14–7 (6–2)	37 – Whittaker	14 – Whittaker	5 – Tied	Gill Coliseum (4,257); Corvallis, OR
January 29, 2026; 6:00 pm, ESPN+		at San Francisco	W 74–66 ^{OT}	15–7 (7–2)	17 – Whittaker	13 – Haile	4 – Aokuso	Sobrato Center (463); San Francisco, CA
January 31, 2026; 7:00 pm, ESPN+		at Washington State	W 81–75	16–7 (8–2)	18 – Whittaker	9 – Haile	5 – Bettencourt	Beasley Coliseum (1,470); Pullman, WA
February 5, 2026; 6:00 pm, SWX/ESPN+		Oregon State	W 67–37	17–7 (9–2)	15 – Tied	12 – Whittaker	5 – Tied	McCarthey Athletic Center (4,901); Spokane, WA
February 7, 2026; 2:00 pm, ESPN+		Pacific	W 72–44	18–7 (10–2)	15 – Tied	10 – Haile	5 – Bettencourt	McCarthey Athletic Center (6,000); Spokane, WA
February 12, 2026; 6:00 pm, ESPN+		at San Diego	W 66–56	19–7 (11–2)	19 – Whittaker	12 – Whittaker	4 – Tied	Jenny Craig Pavilion (585); San Diego, CA
February 14, 2026; 2:00 pm, ESPN+		at Loyola Marymount	L 63–72	19–8 (11–3)	19 – Turner	8 – Whittaker	4 – Smith	Gersten Pavilion (336); Los Angeles, CA
February 19, 2026; 6:00 pm, SWX/ESPN+		Washington State	W 75–50	20–8 (12–3)	16 – Bettencourt	11 – Tied	4 – Smith	McCarthey Athletic Center (5,193); Spokane, WA
February 21, 2026; 2:00 pm, ESPN+		at Pacific	W 85–70	21–8 (13–3)	20 – Whittaker	11 – Whittaker	7 – Bettencourt	Alex G. Spanos Center (541); Stockton, CA
February 26, 2026; 6:00 pm, SWX/ESPN+		Saint Mary's	W 75–67	22–8 (14–3)	29 – Turner	12 – Whittaker	4 – Tied	McCarthey Athletic Center (5,231); Spokane, WA
February 28, 2026; 5:00 pm, ESPNU		at Portland	L 91–92 ^{OT}	22–9 (14–4)	30 – Whittaker	10 – Whittaker	3 – Tied	Chiles Center (1,436); Portland, OR
WCC tournament
March 9, 2026; 2:30 pm, ESPN+	(2)	vs. (3) Santa Clara; Semifinals	W 88–60	23–9	17 – Turner	11 – Haile	4 – Tied	Orleans Arena (3,359); Paradise, NV
March 10, 2026; 1:00 pm, ESPN2	(2)	vs. (4) Oregon State; Final	W 76–66	24–9	26 – Whittaker	9 – Whittaker	5 – Turner	Orleans Arena (3,345); Paradise, NV
NCAA tournament
March 20, 2026*; 12:30 p.m., ESPN2	(12 S2)	vs. (5 S2) No. 19 Ole Miss; First Round	L 66–81	24–10	27 – Turner	13 – Whittaker	4 – Turner	Williams Arena; Minneapolis, MN
*Non-conference game. ^{#}Rankings from AP Poll. (#) Tournament seedings in parentheses. Sacramento 2=S2. All times are in Pacific.

== See also ==
- 2025–26 Gonzaga Bulldogs men's basketball team
