= 2025–26 Pacific Tigers women's basketball team =

American college basketball season

2025–26 Pacific Tigers women's basketball
- Conference: West Coast Conference
- Record: 11–19 (6–12 WCC)
- Head coach: Bradley Davis (11th season)
- Associate head coach: Amy Starr
- Assistant coaches: Amanda Brown; Jovana Subasic; Myles Sherman
- Home arena: Alex G. Spanos Center

2025–26 West Coast Conference women's basketball standings
	Conf.				Overall
Team	W		L	PCT	W		L	PCT
Loyola Marymount	15	–	3	.833	21	–	10	.677
Gonzaga †	14	–	4	.778	24	–	10	.706
Santa Clara	13	–	5	.722	24	–	10	.706
Oregon State	13	–	5	.722	23	–	12	.657
Portland	11	–	7	.611	20	–	15	.571
Pepperdine	10	–	8	.556	21	–	13	.618
San Francisco	9	–	9	.500	19	–	15	.559
Pacific	6	–	12	.333	11	–	19	.367
Washington State	6	–	12	.333	9	–	25	.265
Saint Mary's	6	–	12	.333	15	–	17	.469
San Diego	4	–	14	.222	11	–	22	.333
Seattle	1	–	17	.056	5	–	25	.167
† 2026 WCC tournament winner

The 2025–26 Pacific Tigers women's basketball team represents the University of the Pacific during the 2025–26 NCAA Division I women's basketball season. The Tigers, led by 11th-year head coach Bradley Davis, play their home games at the Alex G. Spanos Center in Stockton, California as members of the West Coast Conference.

== Previous season ==
The Tigers finished the 2024–25 season 15–19, 9–11 in WCC play, to finish in seventh place. They defeated San Diego, and Saint Mary's, before falling to Washington State in the quarterfinals of the WCC tournament. They received an at-large bid to the WNIT, where they would be defeated by New Mexico State in the first round.

== Preseason ==
On October 23, 2025, the West Coast Conference released their preseason poll. Pacific was picked to finish eighth in the conference.

=== Preseason rankings ===
WCC Preseason Poll
Place	Team	Votes
1	Oregon State	119 (9)
2	Gonzaga	111 (3)
3	Washington State	94
4	Portland	91
5	Santa Clara	84
6	San Francisco	70
7	Saint Mary's	55
8	Pacific	52
9	Loyola Marymount	38
10	Pepperdine	36
11	San Diego	31
12	Seattle	11
(#) first-place votes

=== Preseason All-WCC Team ===
No players were named to the Preseason All-WCC Team.

== Roster ==
2025–26 Pacific Tigers women's basketball team
Players
Coaches

Pos.	#	Name	Height	Year	Previous school	Hometown
G	2	Mali Ennis	5 ft 10 in (1.78 m)	Sr	Saint Mary's	Burlingame, California
G	3	Hannah Burg	5 ft 6 in (1.68 m)	Sr	Augustana (SD)	Colorado Springs, Colorado
G	5	Stella Szabo	5 ft 11 in (1.8 m)	RS So	Luleå Gymnasieskola	Stockholm, Sweden
G	7	Liv Yergensen	5 ft 11 in (1.8 m)	Fr	Oak Ridge High School	El Dorado Hills, California
G	8	Sophia Mindermann	5 ft 10 in (1.78 m)	Fr	Folsom High School	Folsom, California
G/F	9	Marina Radocaj	6 ft 3 in (1.91 m)	Jr	Arizona State	Richmond, British Columbia
G/F	10	Sydney Ward	6 ft 0 in (1.83 m)	Sr	The Village School	Houston, Texas
F	11	Luisa Anderegg	6 ft 2 in (1.88 m)	Sr	Midland College	Cologne, Germany
G	15	Nyah Lowery	5 ft 11 in (1.8 m)	Jr	St. Mary's High School	Sacramento, California
G	21	Daria Nestorov	5 ft 4 in (1.63 m)	So	Gymnasium Kraljevo	Zrenjanin, Serbia
G	23	Kenlee Durrill	5 ft 10 in (1.78 m)	RS So	Flatiron Academy	Denver, Colorado
F	24	LaMiracle Lebon	6 ft 3 in (1.91 m)	Fr	Vanden High School	Columbus, Mississippi
F	25	Winner Bartholomew	6 ft 1 in (1.85 m)	So	Rider	Abuja, Nigeria
F	32	Tyla Fautua	6 ft 0 in (1.83 m)	So	Southern Districts Spartans	Brisbane, Australia

Head coach

- Bradley Davis (California)

Assistant coach(es)

- Amy Starr (Washington State)
- Amanda Brown (Gonzaga)
- Jovana Subasic (Oregon State)
- Myles Sherman (TCU)

Legend

- (C) Team captain
- (S) Suspended
- (I) Ineligible
- (W) Walk-on
- Injured
- Current redshirt

Roster
Last update: January 13, 2026

== Schedule and results ==
Date time, TV	Rank^{#}	Opponent^{#}	Result	Record	High points	High rebounds	High assists	Site (attendance) city, state
Non-conference regular season
November 3, 2025*; 6:00 pm, ESPN+		UC San Diego	W 69–66	1–0	15 – Nestorov	10 – Radocaj	4 – Mindermann	Alex G. Spanos Center (1,038); Stockton, CA
November 8, 2025*; 1:00 pm, ESPN+		Cal Baptist	L 54–67	1–1	24 – Bartholomew	9 – Ward	7 – Nestorov	Alex G. Spanos Center (521); Stockton, CA
November 11, 2025*; 7:00 pm, ACCNX		at California	L 52–60	1–2	11 – Ward	6 – Lowery	5 – Nestorov	Haas Pavilion (1,070); Berkeley, CA
November 16, 2025*; 2:00 pm, ESPN+		Seton Hall	L 57–79	1–3	13 – Yergensen	6 – Ward	4 – Yergensen	Alex G. Spanos Center (516); Stockton, CA
November 23, 2025*; 2:00 pm, ESPN+		Cal State Fullerton	L 56−68	1−4	16 – Ward	8 – Ward	3 – Nestorov	Alex G. Spanos Center (526); Stockton, CA
November 28, 2025*; 3:30 pm, ESPN+		Milwaukee; Tiger Turkey Tip-Off	W 77−48	2−4	17 – Bartholomew	7 – Bartholomew	4 – Nestorov	Alex G. Spanos Center (443); Stockton, CA
November 29, 2025*; 3:30 pm, ESPN+		Jacksonville State; Tiger Turkey Tip-Off	W 70–63	3–4	16 – Bartholomew	10 – Radocaj	6 – Nestorov	Alex G. Spanos Center (436); Stockton, CA
December 4, 2025*; 6:00 pm, ESPN+		Sacramento State	W 67–54	4–4	18 – Nestorov	7 – Radocaj	4 – Nestorov	Alex G. Spanos Center (613); Stockton, CA
December 7, 2025*; 1:00 pm, MWN		at San Diego State	L 68–70	4–5	17 – Ward	6 – Lowery	7 – Nestorov	Viejas Arena (2,365); San Diego, CA
December 13, 2025*; 1:00 pm, MWN		at Nevada	Suspended due to power outage					Lawlor Events Center; Reno, NV
December 19, 2025*; 11:00 am, ESPN+		Simpson	W 116–49	5–5	20 – Anderegg	7 – Ward	10 – Nestorov	Alex G. Spanos Center (1,529); Stockton, CA
December 21, 2025*; 1:00 pm, ESPN+		No. 22 Washington	L 50−90	5−6	11 – Bartholomew	4 – Tied	5 – Nestorov	Alex G. Spanos Center (569); Stockton, CA
WCC regular season
December 28, 2025; 1:00 pm, ESPN+		Seattle	W 85–66	6–6 (1–0)	19 – Nestorov	8 – Tied	4 – Nestorov	Alex G. Spanos Center (365); Stockton, CA
December 30, 2025; 2:00 pm, ESPN+		San Diego	W 72–68	7–6 (2–0)	19 – Ward	8 – Ward	4 – Nestorov	Alex G. Spanos Center (372); Stockton, CA
January 2, 2026; 6:00 pm, ESPN+		at Oregon State	L 61–81	7–7 (2–1)	15 – Mindermann	7 – Ward	3 – Nestorov	Gill Coliseum (3,369); Corvallis, OR
January 4, 2026; 2:00 pm, ESPN+		at Portland	L 53–74	7–8 (2–2)	13 – Ward	8 – Bartholomew	6 – Nestorov	Chiles Center (967); Portland, OR
January 8, 2026; 6:00 pm, ESPN+		Saint Mary's	L 55–60	7–9 (2–3)	19 – Bartholomew	8 – Ward	6 – Nestorov	Alex G. Spanos Center (517); Stockton, CA
January 15, 2026; 6:00 pm, ESPN+		at Pepperdine	L 53-71	7-10 (2-4)	19 – Bartholomew	10 – Ward	5 – Nestorov	Firestone Fieldhouse (288); Malibu, CA
January 17, 2026; 2:00 pm, ESPN+		LMU	L 54-74	7-11 (2-5)	28 – Bartholomew	9 – Radocaj	8 – Nestorov	Alex G. Spanos Center (812); Stockton, CA
January 22, 2026; 6:00 pm, ESPN+		Washington State	W 65-53	8-11 (3-5)	15 – Nestorov	9 – Ward	4 – Tied	Alex G. Spanos Center (494); Stockton, CA
January 24, 2026; 2:00 pm, ESPN+		at San Francisco	L 61-68	8-12 (3-6)	19 – Bartholomew	15 – Ward	4 – Nestorov	Sobrato Center (265); San Francisco, CA
January 29, 2026; 6:00 pm, ESPN+		at LMU	L 66-87	8-13 (3-7)	14 – Mindermann	6 – Tied	9 – Nestorov	Gersten Pavilion (205); Los Angeles, CA
February 5, 2026; 6:00 pm, ESPN+		Santa Clara	W 90-82	9-13 (4-7)	27 – Ward	11 – Ward	7 – Nestorov	Alex G. Spanos Center (617); Stockton, CA
February 7, 2026; 2:00 pm, ESPN+		at Gonzaga	L 44-72	9-14 (4-8)	12 – Bartholomew	7 – Ward	3 – Nestorov	McCarthey Athletic Center (6,000); Spokane, WA
February 12, 2026; 6:30 pm, ESPN+		at Saint Mary's	W 56-53	10-14 (5-8)	17 – Nestorov	10 – Ward	6 – Nestorov	University Credit Union Pavilion (367); Moraga, CA
February 14, 2026; 2:00 pm, ESPN+		Oregon State	L 60-70	10-15 (5-9)	19 – Nestorov	9 – Bartholomew	3 – Ward	Alex G. Spanos Center (532); Stockton, CA
February 19, 2026; 6:00 pm, ESPN+		San Francisco	W 73-51	11-15 (6-9)	18 – Nestorov	8 – Bartholomew	5 – Tied	Alex G. Spanos Center (537); Stockton, CA
February 21, 2026; 2:00 pm, ESPN+		Gonzaga	L 70-85	11-16 (6-10)	30 – Ward	6 – Ward	9 – Nestorov	Alex G. Spanos Center (541); Stockton, CA
February 26, 2026; 6:00 pm, ESPN+		at Santa Clara	L 79-87	11-17 (6-11)	20 – Nestorov	8 – Ward	5 – Nestorov	Leavey Center (370); Santa Clara, CA
February 28, 2026; 2:00 pm, ESPN+		at San Diego	L 59-64	11-18 (6-12)	17 – Bartholomew	6 – Lowery	4 – Tied	Jenny Craig Pavilion (1,988); San Diego, CA
WCC tournament
March 6, 2026; 12:00 pm, ESPN+	(8)	vs. (9) Washington State; Second Round	L 76-82	11-19	21 – Ward	10 – Ward	3 – Nestorov	Orleans Arena (977); Paradise, NV
*Non-conference game. ^{#}Rankings from AP Poll. (#) Tournament seedings in parentheses. All times are in Pacific.
