= 2025–26 Pepperdine Waves women's basketball team =

American college basketball season

2025–26 Pepperdine Waves women's basketball

WNIT, Super 16
- Conference: West Coast Conference
- Record: 21–13 (10–8 WCC)
- Head coach: Katie Faulkner (2nd season)
- Assistant coaches: Erika Bean; Brian Porth; Kamran Sufi; Makena Mastora
- Home arena: Firestone Fieldhouse

2025–26 West Coast Conference women's basketball standings
	Conf.				Overall
Team	W		L	PCT	W		L	PCT
Loyola Marymount	15	–	3	.833	21	–	10	.677
Gonzaga †	14	–	4	.778	24	–	10	.706
Santa Clara	13	–	5	.722	24	–	10	.706
Oregon State	13	–	5	.722	23	–	12	.657
Portland	11	–	7	.611	20	–	14	.588
Pepperdine	10	–	8	.556	21	–	12	.636
San Francisco	9	–	9	.500	19	–	15	.559
Pacific	6	–	12	.333	11	–	19	.367
Washington State	6	–	12	.333	9	–	25	.265
Saint Mary's	6	–	12	.333	15	–	17	.469
San Diego	4	–	14	.222	11	–	22	.333
Seattle	1	–	17	.056	5	–	25	.167
† 2026 WCC tournament winner As of March 20, 2026

The 2025–26 Pepperdine Waves women's basketball team represented Pepperdine University during the 2025–26 NCAA Division I women's basketball season. The Waves, led by second-year head coach Katie Faulkner, played their home games at Firestone Fieldhouse in Malibu, California as members of the West Coast Conference.

== Previous season ==
The Waves finished the 2024–25 season 8–22, 3–17 in WCC play, to finish in tenth place. They were defeated by San Diego in the first round of the WCC tournament.

== Preseason ==
On October 23, 2025, the West Coast Conference released their preseason poll. Pepperdine was picked to finish tenth in the conference.

=== Preseason rankings ===
WCC Preseason Poll
Place	Team	Votes
1	Oregon State	119 (9)
2	Gonzaga	111 (3)
3	Washington State	94
4	Portland	91
5	Santa Clara	84
6	San Francisco	70
7	Saint Mary's	55
8	Pacific	52
9	Loyola Marymount	38
10	Pepperdine	36
11	San Diego	31
12	Seattle	11
(#) first-place votes

=== Preseason All-WCC Team ===
No players were named to the Preseason All-WCC Team.

== Roster ==
2025–26 Pepperdine Waves women's basketball team
Players
Coaches

Pos.	#	Name	Height	Year	Previous school	Hometown
G	0	Ivory Finley	5 ft 10 in (1.78 m)	GS	Utah State	Minneapolis, Minnesota
G	1	Taija Sta. Maria	5 ft 6 in (1.68 m)	Jr	Fresno State	Toronto, Ontario
G	2	Elli Guiney	5 ft 11 in (1.8 m)	So	UNLV	Goodyear, Arizona
G	3	Bella Green	6 ft 0 in (1.83 m)	GS	West Florida	Perth, Australia
G	10	Ilinca Belegante	6 ft 0 in (1.83 m)	Fr	ACS Sepsi SIC	Bucharest, Romania
G	11	Quinn VanSickle	5 ft 8 in (1.73 m)	Fr	Valor Christian High School	Castle Rock, Colorado
F	12	Shorna Preston	6 ft 1 in (1.85 m)	Jr	Dodge City Community College	Gold Coast, Australia
G	13	Meghan Fiso	5 ft 10 in (1.78 m)	GS	San Diego State	Seattle, Washington
G	22	Lina Falk	6 ft 2 in (1.88 m)	Jr	Sacramento State	Wolfenbüttel, Germany
G	30	Seleh Harmon	5 ft 10 in (1.78 m)	Fr	Norman North High School	Norman, Oklahoma
F	31	Irune Orio	6 ft 2 in (1.88 m)	Sr	Xavier	Balmaseda, Spain
F	44	Zoe Shanahan	6 ft 2 in (1.88 m)	Fr	Rowville Secondary College	Melbourne, Australia

Head coach

- Katie Faulkner (Montana)

Assistant coach(es)

- Erika Bean (Utah)
- Brian Porth (SMU)
- Kamran Sufi (Saint Mary's)
- Makena Mastora (Pepperdine)

Legend

- (C) Team captain
- (S) Suspended
- (I) Ineligible
- (W) Walk-on
- Injured
- Current redshirt

Roster
Last update: January 13, 2026

== Schedule and results ==
Date time, TV	Rank^{#}	Opponent^{#}	Result	Record	High points	High rebounds	High assists	Site (attendance) city, state
Non-conference regular season
November 4, 2025*; 7:00 pm, ESPN+		at Cal State Fullerton	W 84–70	1–0	17 – Finley	8 – Preston	7 – Sta. Maria	Titan Gym (336); Fullerton, CA
November 8, 2025*; 2:00 pm, ESPN+		Westmont	W 74–51	2–0	15 – Guiney	9 – Preston	4 – Tied	Firestone Fieldhouse (301); Malibu, CA
November 14, 2025*; 5:00 pm, ESPN+		at Utah Valley	L 56–85	2–1	12 – Harmon	11 – Preston	5 – Sta. Maria	UCCU Center (581); Orem, UT
November 19, 2025*; 5:00 pm, ESPN+		at Northern Arizona	W 80–74	3–1	24 – Guiney	8 – Preston	3 – Tied	Rolle Activity Center (244); Flagstaff, AZ
November 23, 2025*; 2:00 pm, ESPN+		San Jose State	W 76−52	4−1	19 – Guiney	10 – Fiso	3 – Tied	Firestone Fieldhouse (321); Malibu, CA
November 28, 2025*; 2:00 pm, B1G+		at No. 18 USC	L 52−82	4−2	12 – Guiney	9 – Green	6 – Guiney	Galen Center (3,866); Los Angeles, CA
December 3, 2025*; 6:00 pm, ESPN+		Cal Baptist	W 69–58	5–2	21 – Preston	13 – Preston	5 – Guiney	Firestone Fieldhouse (251); Malibu, CA
December 6, 2025*; 5:00 pm, ESPN+		at Fresno State	W 65–45	6–2	16 – Preston	12 – Preston	4 – Preston	Save Mart Center (1,259); Fresno, CA
December 13, 2025*; 2:00 pm, ESPN+		Cal State Los Angeles	W 80–72	7–2	20 – Preston	10 – Preston	7 – Guiney	Firestone Fieldhouse (280); Malibu, CA
December 16, 2025*; 2:00 pm, ESPN+		North Dakota State; Malibu Classic	L 80–82 ^{OT}	7–3	17 – Tied	7 – Tied	4 – Tied	Firestone Fieldhouse (269); Malibu, CA
December 17, 2025*; 6:00 pm, ESPN+		South Dakota; Malibu Classic	W 73–65	8–3	19 – Fiso	8 – Preston	3 – Tied	Firestone Fieldhouse (261); Malibu, CA
December 20, 2025*; 1:00 pm, ESPN+		Cal State Northridge	W 69−63	9−3	18 – Falk	16 – Preston	4 – Sta. Maria	Firestone Fieldhouse (280); Malibu, CA
WCC regular season
December 28, 2025; 12:00 pm, ESPN+		at Washington State	L 63–66	9–4 (0–1)	26 – Guiney	11 – Preston	4 – Preston	Beasley Coliseum (997); Pullman, WA
December 30, 2025; 6:00 pm, ESPN+		at Gonzaga	L 52–75	9–5 (0–2)	16 – Sta. Maria	5 – Preston	2 – Tied	McCarthey Athletic Center (4,980); Spokane, WA
January 2, 2026; 6:00 pm, ESPN+		Saint Mary's	W 60–52	10–5 (1–2)	14 – Tied	15 – Preston	5 – Guiney	Firestone Fieldhouse (318); Malibu, CA
January 8, 2026; 6:00 pm, ESPN+		LMU	L 78–83 ^{OT}	10–6 (1–3)	22 – Guiney	15 – Preston	5 – Tied	Firestone Fieldhouse (377); Malibu, CA
January 10, 2026; 2:00 pm, ESPN+		at San Diego	L 51–54	10–7 (1–4)	16 – Fiso	10 – Preston	5 – Preston	Jenny Craig Pavilion (541); San Diego, CA
January 15, 2026; 6:00 pm, ESPN+		Pacific	W 71-53	11-7 (2-4)	26 – Falk	7 – Guiney	5 – Fiso	Firestone Fieldhouse (288); Malibu, CA
January 17, 2026; 2:00 pm, ESPN+		Oregon State	L 68-69	11-8 (2-5)	26 – Guiney	10 – Green	5 – Green	Firestone Fieldhouse (558); Malibu, CA
January 22, 2026; 6:30 pm, ESPN+		at Saint Mary's	L 51-53	11-9 (2-6)	15 – Harmon	12 – Preston	5 – Sta. Maria	University Credit Union Pavilion (424); Moraga, CA
January 24, 2026; 5:00 pm, ESPN+		Portland	W 86-68	12-9 (3-6)	25 – Falk	8 – Green	5 – Sta. Maria	Firestone Fieldhouse (388); Malibu, CA
January 29, 2026; 6:00 pm, ESPN+		Seattle	W 90-63	13-9 (4-6)	23 – Guiney	10 – Green	5 – Guiney	Firestone Fieldhouse (301); Malibu, CA
January 31, 2026; 1:00 pm, ESPN+		at Santa Clara	W 74-72	14-9 (5-6)	15 – Tied	10 – Falk	5 – Preston	Leavey Center (1,952); Santa Clara, CA
February 7, 2026; 1:00 pm, ESPN+		Washington State	W 78-62	15-9 (6-6)	19 – Falk	11 – Preston	6 – Sta. Maria	Firestone Fieldhouse (370); Malibu, CA
February 12, 2026; 6:00 pm, ESPN+		at LMU	L 62-72	15-10 (6-7)	22 – Guiney	7 – Falk	4 – Sta. Maria	Gersten Pavilion (193); Los Angeles, CA
February 14, 2026; 5:00 pm, ESPN+		at San Francisco	L 70-81	15-11 (6-8)	18 – Fiso	12 – Green	4 – Sta. Maria	Sobrato Center (304); San Francisco, CA
February 19, 2026; 6:00 pm, ESPN+		San Diego	W 76-55	16-11 (7-8)	15 – Sta. Maria	7 – Green	6 – Guiney	Firestone Fieldhouse (377); Malibu, CA
February 21, 2026; 2:00 pm, ESPN+		Santa Clara	W 80-63	17-11 (8-8)	20 – Guiney	11 – Preston	11 – Sta. Maria	Firestone Fieldhouse (411); Malibu, CA
February 26, 2026; 6:00 pm, ESPN+		at Portland	W 70-63	18-11 (9-8)	17 – Falk	9 – Preston	6 – Guiney	Chiles Center (608); Portland, OR
February 28, 2026; 1:00 pm, ESPN+		at Seattle	W 81-67	19-11 (10-8)	25 – Falk	10 – Green	5 – Sta. Maria	Redhawk Center (658); Seattle, WA
WCC tournament
March 7, 2026; 2:30 pm, ESPN+	(6)	vs. (7) San Francisco; Third Round	L 69-86	19-12	22 – Guiney	8 – Fiso	4 – Guiney	Orleans Arena (1,526); Paradise, NV
WNIT
March 19, 2026*; 6:00 pm, ESPN+		UC Davis; First Round	W 71–68	20–12	27 – Guiney	15 – Green	6 – Sta. Maria	Firestone Fieldhouse (438); Malibu, CA
March 22, 2026*; 2:00 pm, ESPN+		Southern Utah; Second Round	W 85–80	21–12	22 – Sta. Maria	11 – Preston	4 – Guiney	Firestone Fieldhouse (325); Malibu, CA
March 26, 2026*; 5:00 pm, Midco Sports/SLN		at South Dakota; Super 16	L 57–73	21–13	16 – Guiney	5 – Preston	5 – Sta. Maria	Sanford Coyote Sports Center (1,596); Vermillion, SD
*Non-conference game. ^{#}Rankings from AP Poll. (#) Tournament seedings in parentheses. All times are in Pacific.
