= 2025–26 Loyola Marymount Lions women's basketball team =

American college basketball season

2025–26 Loyola Marymount Lions women's basketball

WCC regular season champions

WBIT, First Round
- Conference: West Coast Conference
- Record: 21–10 (15–3 WCC)
- Head coach: Aarika Hughes (5th season)
- Associate head coach: Brooke Atkinson
- Assistant coaches: Lauren Unger; Jody Burrows; Brad Johnson; Amanda Delgado
- Home arena: Gersten Pavilion

2025–26 West Coast Conference women's basketball standings
	Conf.				Overall
Team	W		L	PCT	W		L	PCT
Loyola Marymount	15	–	3	.833	21	–	10	.677
Gonzaga †	14	–	4	.778	24	–	10	.706
Santa Clara	13	–	5	.722	24	–	10	.706
Oregon State	13	–	5	.722	23	–	12	.657
Portland	11	–	7	.611	20	–	15	.571
Pepperdine	10	–	8	.556	21	–	13	.618
San Francisco	9	–	9	.500	19	–	15	.559
Pacific	6	–	12	.333	11	–	19	.367
Washington State	6	–	12	.333	9	–	25	.265
Saint Mary's	6	–	12	.333	15	–	17	.469
San Diego	4	–	14	.222	11	–	22	.333
Seattle	1	–	17	.056	5	–	25	.167
† 2026 WCC tournament winner

The 2025–26 Loyola Marymount Lions women's basketball team represents Loyola Marymount University during the 2025–26 NCAA Division I women's basketball season. The Lions, led by fifth-year head coach Aarika Hughes, play their home games at Gersten Pavilion in Los Angeles, California, as members of the West Coast Conference.

== Previous season ==
The Lions finished the 2024–25 season 14–16, 7–13 in WCC play, to finish in ninth place. They defeated Santa Clara, before falling to San Francisco in the third round of the WCC tournament.

== Preseason ==
On October 23, 2025, the West Coast Conference released their preseason poll. Loyola Marymount was picked to finish ninth in the conference.

=== Preseason rankings ===
WCC Preseason Poll
Place	Team	Votes
1	Oregon State	119 (9)
2	Gonzaga	111 (3)
3	Washington State	94
4	Portland	91
5	Santa Clara	84
6	San Francisco	70
7	Saint Mary's	55
8	Pacific	52
9	Loyola Marymount	38
10	Pepperdine	36
11	San Diego	31
12	Seattle	11
(#) first-place votes

=== Preseason All-WCC Team ===
Preseason All-WCC Team
Player	Year	Position
Maya Hernandez	Junior	Forward

== Roster ==
2025–26 Loyola Marymount Lions women's basketball team
Players
Coaches

Pos.	#	Name	Height	Year	Previous school	Hometown
G	0	Jess Lawson	5 ft 7 in (1.7 m)	GS	Central Michigan	Las Vegas, Nevada
G	2	Mari Somvichian	5 ft 4 in (1.63 m)	Jr	Oakland Technical High School	Oakland, California
G	4	Allison Clarke	5 ft 11 in (1.8 m)	So	Rosary Academy	Anaheim, California
G	5	Carly Heidger	6 ft 3 in (1.91 m)	Sr	Samford	Dacula, Georgia
F	7	Ana Milanovic	6 ft 2 in (1.88 m)	So	Middle Tennessee	Belgrade, Serbia
G	10	Lova Lagerlid	6 ft 1 in (1.85 m)	So	Colorado	Stockholm, Sweden
G	13	Ivana Krajina	5 ft 11 in (1.8 m)	Sr	Texas Tech	Kaštel Novi, Croatia
F	22	Ali'a Matavao	6 ft 0 in (1.83 m)	RS So	BYU	Las Vegas, Nevada
F	24	Kayla Jones	6 ft 0 in (1.83 m)	Jr	Grayson College	Norman, Oklahoma
G	28	Andjela Matic	5 ft 9 in (1.75 m)	Sr	Duquesne	Ub, Serbia
F	30	Paula Reus Piza	6 ft 1 in (1.85 m)	GS	New Mexico	Palma de Mallorca, Spain
G	54	Zawadi Ogot	5 ft 11 in (1.8 m)	So	Santiago High School	Upland, California
F	55	Maya Hernandez	6 ft 0 in (1.83 m)	Jr	Archbishop Mitty High School	San Jose, California

Head coach

- Aarika Hughes (USC)

Assistant coach(es)

- Brooke Atkinson (Wichita State)
- Lauren Unger (UT Permian Basin)
- Jody Burrows (Northeastern)
- Brad Johnson
- Amanda Delgado (Oregon)

Legend

- (C) Team captain
- (S) Suspended
- (I) Ineligible
- (W) Walk-on
- Injured
- Current redshirt

Roster
Last update: January 11, 2026

== Schedule and results ==
Date time, TV	Rank^{#}	Opponent^{#}	Result	Record	High points	High rebounds	High assists	Site (attendance) city, state
Non-conference regular season
November 5, 2025*; 5:00 pm, ESPN+		Utah Valley	L 60–64	0–1	15 – Krajina	8 – Tied	4 – Tied	Gersten Pavilion (287); Los Angeles, CA
November 9, 2025*; 2:00 pm, ESPN+		Denver	W 64–57	1–1	25 – Hernandez	10 – Hernandez	6 – Matic	Gersten Pavilion; Los Angeles, CA
November 13, 2025*; 10:30 am, MWN		at Nevada	L 52–56	1–2	16 – Hernandez	4 – Tied	5 – Krajina	Lawlor Events Center (4,970); Reno, NV
November 18, 2025*; 6:00 pm, ESPN+		Westcliff	Canceled					Gersten Pavilion; Los Angeles, CA
November 21, 2025*; 1:00 pm, ESPN+		at Hawai'i; Bank of Hawai'i Classic	L 51–55	1–3	15 – Lawson	6 – Lawson	2 – Tied	Stan Sheriff Center (2,784); Honolulu, HI
November 23, 2025*; 2:00 pm		vs. Idaho State; Bank of Hawai'i Classic	W 71−52	2−3	23 – Lawson	9 – Lawson	3 – Tied	Stan Sheriff Center; Honolulu, HI
November 29, 2025*; 5:00 pm, ESPN+		at Cal State Fullerton	W 73−62	3−3	24 – Lawson	8 – Hernandez	3 – Tied	Titan Gym (231); Fullerton, CA
December 5, 2025*; 6:00 pm, ESPN+		Utah State	W 63–58	4–3	15 – Hernandez	13 – Lawson	4 – Tied	Gersten Pavilion (276); Los Angeles, CA
December 13, 2025*; 2:30 pm, ESPN+		at Wichita State	L 64–71	4–4	27 – Lawson	12 – Lawson	2 – Tied	Charles Koch Arena (725); Wichita, KS
December 16, 2025*; 6:00 pm, ESPN+		Chapman	W 81–27	5–4	17 – Matic	8 – Lawson	4 – Tied	Gersten Pavilion (201); Los Angeles, CA
December 20, 2025*; 3:30 pm, ESPN+		Weber State; LMU Christmas Tournament	L 60–68	5–5	16 – Hernandez	8 – Lawson	4 – Matic	Gersten Pavilion (196); Los Angeles, CA
December 21, 2025*; 2:30 pm, ESPN+		Southern Utah; LMU Christmas Tournament	W 76–68	6–5	17 – Lawson	7 – Lawson	7 – Matic	Gersten Pavilion; Los Angeles, CA
WCC regular season
December 28, 2025; 2:00 pm, ESPN+		at Gonzaga	L 80–87 ^{2OT}	6–6 (0–1)	18 – Hernandez	6 – Matic	5 – Matic	McCarthey Athletic Center (5,179); Spokane, WA
December 30, 2025; 6:00 pm, ESPN+		at Washington State	W 67–58	7–6 (1–1)	16 – Lawson	11 – Lawson	5 – Matic	Beasley Coliseum (887); Pullman, WA
January 2, 2026; 6:00 pm, ESPN+		Santa Clara	W 92–85	8–6 (2–1)	25 – Hernandez	7 – Lawson	5 – Matic	Gersten Pavilion (303); Los Angeles, CA
January 4, 2026; 2:00 pm, ESPN+		San Francisco	L 82–85 ^{OT}	8–7 (2–2)	32 – Lawson	10 – Hernandez	4 – Krajina	Gersten Pavilion (227); Los Angeles, CA
January 8, 2026; 6:00 pm, ESPN+		at Pepperdine	W 83–78 ^{OT}	9–7 (3–2)	21 – Hernandez	8 – Hernandez	4 – Krajina	Firestone Fieldhouse (377); Malibu, CA
January 15, 2026; 6:00 pm, ESPN+		Oregon State	W 55-51	10-7 (4-2)	14 – Tied	16 – Lawson	4 – Tied	Gersten Pavilion; Los Angeles, CA
January 17, 2026; 2:00 pm, ESPN+		at Pacific	W 74-54	11-7 (5-2)	15 – Matic	8 – Jones	5 – Krajina	Alex G. Spanos Center (812); Stockton, CA
January 22, 2026; 6:00 pm, ESPN+		Portland	W 77-68	12-7 (6-2)	20 – Hernandez	6 – Tied	4 – Krajina	Gersten Pavilion; Los Angeles, CA
January 24, 2026; 2:00 pm, ESPN+		at San Diego	L 60-69	12-8 (6-3)	23 – Lawson	10 – Lawson	4 – Matic	Jenny Craig Pavilion (955); San Diego, CA
January 29, 2026; 6:00 pm, ESPN+		Pacific	W 87-66	13-8 (7-3)	18 – Heidger	6 – Lawson	9 – Krajina	Gersten Pavilion (205); Los Angeles, CA
January 31, 2026; 2:00 pm, ESPN+		Seattle	W 81-40	14-8 (8-3)	12 – Tied	12 – Hernandez	7 – Krajina	Gersten Pavilion (393); Los Angeles, CA
February 5, 2026; 6:30 pm, ESPN+		at Saint Mary's	W 75-69	15-8 (9-3)	15 – Hernandez	5 – Hernandez	7 – Matic	University Credit Union Pavilion (378); Moraga, CA
February 12, 2026; 6:00 pm, ESPN+		Pepperdine	W 72-62	16-8 (10-3)	17 – Lawson	8 – Lawson	4 – Lawson	Gersten Pavilion (193); Los Angeles, CA
February 14, 2026; 2:00 pm, ESPN+		Gonzaga	W 72-63	17-8 (11-3)	16 – Tied	7 – Lawson	4 – Tied	Gersten Pavilion (336); Los Angeles, CA
February 19, 2026; 6:00 pm, ESPN+		at Seattle	W 78-54	18-8 (12-3)	22 – Hernandez	5 – Tied	3 – Tied	Redhawk Center (252); Seattle, WA
February 21, 2026; 4:00 pm, ESPN+		San Diego	W 74–61	19–8 (13–3)	23 – Matic	14 – Lawson	5 – Tied	Gersten Pavilion (432); Los Angeles, CA
February 26, 2026; 6:00 pm, ESPN+		at San Francisco	W 66–57	20–8 (14–3)	17 – Lawson	9 – Hernandez	2 – Tied	Sobrato Center (267); San Francisco, CA
February 28, 2026; 1:00 pm, ESPN+		at Oregon State	W 71-69 ^{OT}	21-8 (15-3)	20 – Hernandez	21 – Lawson	4 – Matic	Gill Coliseum (4,452); Corvallis, OR
WCC tournament
March 9, 2026; 12:00 pm, ESPN+	(1)	vs. (4) Oregon State; Semifinals	L 67-73	21-9	25 – Lawson	10 – Lawson	4 – Reus Piza	Orleans Arena (1,905); Paradise, NV
WBIT
March 19, 2026; 7:00 pm, ESPN+		at (2) Stanford; First Round	L 76–80	21–10	21 – Krajina	11 – Lawson	4 – Lawson	Maples Pavilion (944); Stanford, CA
*Non-conference game. ^{#}Rankings from AP Poll. (#) Tournament seedings in parentheses. All times are in Pacific.
