= 2025–26 Oregon State Beavers women's basketball team =

American college basketball season

2025–26 Oregon State Beavers women's basketball

WBIT, First Round
- Conference: West Coast Conference
- Record: 23–12 (13–5 WCC)
- Head coach: Scott Rueck (16th season)
- Assistant coaches: Deven Hunter; Sydney Wiese; Eric Ely; Jared Vedus
- Home arena: Gill Coliseum

2025–26 West Coast Conference women's basketball standings
| | Conf. | | | | Overall |
| Team | W | | L | PCT | W | | L | PCT |
|---|---|---|---|---|---|---|---|---|
| Loyola Marymount | 15 | – | 3 | .833 | 21 | – | 10 | .677 |
| Gonzaga † | 14 | – | 4 | .778 | 24 | – | 10 | .706 |
| Santa Clara | 13 | – | 5 | .722 | 24 | – | 10 | .706 |
| Oregon State | 13 | – | 5 | .722 | 23 | – | 12 | .657 |
| Portland | 11 | – | 7 | .611 | 20 | – | 14 | .588 |
| Pepperdine | 10 | – | 8 | .556 | 21 | – | 12 | .636 |
| San Francisco | 9 | – | 9 | .500 | 19 | – | 15 | .559 |
| Pacific | 6 | – | 12 | .333 | 11 | – | 19 | .367 |
| Washington State | 6 | – | 12 | .333 | 9 | – | 25 | .265 |
| Saint Mary's | 6 | – | 12 | .333 | 15 | – | 17 | .469 |
| San Diego | 4 | – | 14 | .222 | 11 | – | 22 | .333 |
| Seattle | 1 | – | 17 | .056 | 5 | – | 25 | .167 |
† 2026 WCC tournament winner As of March 20, 2026

The 2025–26 Oregon State Beavers women's basketball team represents Oregon State University during the 2025–26 NCAA Division I women's basketball season. The Beavers, led by 16th-year head coach Scott Rueck, play their home games at Gill Coliseum in Corvallis, Oregon as associate members of the West Coast Conference (WCC).

This season will mark Oregon State's last season as associate members of the West Coast Conference, as they will be rejoining the newly reformed Pac-12 Conference, effective July 1, 2026.

== Previous season ==
The Beavers finished the 2024–25 season 19–16, 12–8 in WCC play, to finish in fourth place. They defeated San Francisco, top-seeded Gonzaga, and Portland to win the West Coast Conference tournament championship, earning the conference's automatic bid to the NCAA tournament. They would receive the No. 14 seed in the Birmingham Regional 2, where they would be defeated by No. 3 seed North Carolina in the First Round.

== Preseason ==
On October 23, 2025, the West Coast Conference released their preseason poll. Oregon State was picked to finish atop the conference, receiving nine of the twelve first-place votes.

=== Preseason rankings ===
WCC Preseason Poll
| Place | Team | Votes |
|---|---|---|
| 1 | Oregon State | 119 (9) |
| 2 | Gonzaga | 111 (3) |
| 3 | Washington State | 94 |
| 4 | Portland | 91 |
| 5 | Santa Clara | 84 |
| 6 | San Francisco | 70 |
| 7 | Saint Mary's | 55 |
| 8 | Pacific | 52 |
| 9 | Loyola Marymount | 38 |
| 10 | Pepperdine | 36 |
| 11 | San Diego | 31 |
| 12 | Seattle | 11 |
(#) first-place votes

=== Preseason All-WCC Team ===
Preseason All-WCC Team
| Player | Year | Position |
|---|---|---|
| Tiara Bolden | Senior | Guard |
| Catarina Ferreira | Senior | Guard |
| Kennedie Shuler | Junior | Guard |

== Roster ==
2025–26 Oregon State Beavers women's basketball team
Players
Coaches

| Pos. | # | Name | Height | Year | Previous school | Hometown |
|---|---|---|---|---|---|---|
| G | 0 | Tiara Bolden | 5 ft 11 in (1.8 m) | Sr | La Salle | Eugene, Oregon |
| G | 1 | Kennedie Shuler | 5 ft 10 in (1.78 m) | Jr | Barlow High School | Gresham, Oregon |
| G | 2 | Katelyn Field | 5 ft 11 in (1.8 m) | Fr | Casey Cavaliers | Melbourne, Australia |
| G | 3 | Jenna Villa | 6 ft 1 in (1.85 m) | Jr | Washington State | Arlington, Washington |
| G | 4 | Ally Schimel | 5 ft 10 in (1.78 m) | So | Corbett School | Corbett, Oregon |
| G | 7 | Lucia Navarro | 6 ft 0 in (1.83 m) | Jr | Florida State | Valencia, Spain |
| F | 10 | Susana Yepes | 6 ft 0 in (1.83 m) | RS Sr | South Georgia Tech | Medellín, Colombia |
| G | 12 | Mackenzie Shivers | 5 ft 6 in (1.68 m) | RS Jr | Mesa Community College | Mesa, Arizona |
| F | 15 | Lizzy Williamson | 6 ft 5 in (1.96 m) | Sr | NC State | Adelaide, Australia |
| F | 16 | Elisa Mehyar | 6 ft 5 in (1.96 m) | So | SISU Copenhagen | Copenhagen, Denmark |
| F | 22 | Lara Alonso-Basurto | 6 ft 3 in (1.91 m) | Fr | Distrito Olimpico | Madrid, Spain |
| G | 25 | Keira Lindemans | 6 ft 0 in (1.83 m) | Fr | Bulleen Boomers | Melbourne, Australia |
| G | 30 | Catarina Ferreira | 6 ft 0 in (1.83 m) | Sr | Baylor | São Paulo, Brazil |
| G | 31 | Cloe Vecina | 5 ft 8 in (1.73 m) | So | Celta Baloncesto | Vigo, Spain |
| C | 32 | Néné Sow | 6 ft 8 in (2.03 m) | RS Sr | Utah | Brussels, Belgium |

Head coach

- Scott Rueck (Oregon State)

Assistant coach(es)

- Deven Hunter (Oregon State)
- Sydney Wiese (Oregon State)
- Eric Ely (Northwest Nazarene)
- Jared Vedus (Oregon State)

Legend

- (C) Team captain
- (S) Suspended
- (I) Ineligible
- (W) Walk-on
- Injured
- Current redshirt

Roster
Last update: January 6, 2026

== Schedule and results ==
| Date time, TV | Rank^{#} | Opponent^{#} | Result | Record | High points | High rebounds | High assists | Site (attendance) city, state |
Exhibition
| November 2, 2025*; 7:00 pm | | Alaska Fairbanks | W 104–27 | – | 22 – Bolden | 7 – Alonso-Basurto | 9 – Shuler | Gill Coliseum (1,800); Corvallis, OR |
Non-conference regular season
| November 7, 2025*; 3:00 pm, ESPN+ | | Corban | W 86–45 | 1–0 | 14 – Alonso-Basurto | 11 – Alonso-Basurto | 5 – Shuler | Gill Coliseum (3,100); Corvallis, OR |
| November 10, 2025*; 6:00 pm, ESPN+ | | Air Force | W 60–49 | 2–0 | 23 – Bolden | 12 – Alonso-Basurto | 8 – Shuler | Gill Coliseum (3,079); Corvallis, OR |
| November 14, 2025*; 6:00 pm, ESPN+ | | Illinois | W 64–59 | 3–0 | 25 – Bolden | 6 – Tied | 5 – Shuler | Gill Coliseum (3,353); Corvallis, OR |
| November 18, 2025*; 11:00 am, ESPN+ | | Utah State | W 71–52 | 4–0 | 23 – Bolden | 15 – Sow | 4 – Villa | Gill Coliseum (8,613); Corvallis, OR |
| November 21, 2025*; 6:00 pm, ESPN+ | | Colorado State | L 58−64 | 4−1 | 22 – Villa | 8 – Williamson | 5 – Tied | Gill Coliseum (3,582); Corvallis, OR |
| November 23, 2025*; 1:00 pm, ESPN+ | | Long Beach State | W 71−55 | 5−1 | 14 – Tied | 10 – Villa | 14 – Shuler | Gill Coliseum (3,190); Corvallis, OR |
| November 27, 2025*; 5:00 pm, ESPN+ | | vs. No. 17 Vanderbilt; Paradise Jam Island Division semifinals | L 66–88 | 5–2 | 15 – Tied | 10 – Schimel | 5 – Shuler | UVI Sports and Fitness Center (824); St. Thomas, USVI |
| November 29, 2025*; 11:30 am, ESPN+ | | vs. Virginia Tech; Paradise Jam Island Division 3rd place game | L 67–78 | 5–3 | 19 – Villa | 7 – Villa | 5 – Shuler | UVI Sports and Fitness Center (324); St. Thomas, USVI |
| December 3, 2025*; 6:00 pm, B1G+ | | at Oregon; Rivalry | L 73–96 | 5–4 | 27 – Villa | 7 – Shuler | 5 – Shuler | Matthew Knight Arena (5,282); Eugene, OR |
| December 7, 2025*; 1:00 pm, ESPN+ | | Alaska Anchorage | W 69–53 | 6–4 | 23 – Bolden | 10 – Alonso-Basurto | 5 – Bolden | Gill Coliseum (3,101); Corvallis, OR |
| December 14, 2025*; 1:00 pm, ESPN+ | | Arizona State | L 53–55 | 6–5 | 18 – Villa | 12 – Sow | 4 – Shuler | Gill Coliseum (3,143); Corvallis, OR |
| December 19, 2025*; 7:00 pm, YouTube | | vs. Montana State; Maui Classic | W 53−51 | 7−5 | 19 – Villa | 7 – Tied | 7 – Shuler | Seabury Hall; Makawao, HI |
| December 20, 2025*; 8:00 pm, YouTube | | vs. Liberty; Maui Classic | W 64–57 | 8–5 | 21 – Shuler | 6 – Tied | 2 – Tied | Seabury Hall (1,299); Makawao, HI |
WCC regular season
| December 28, 2025; 2:00 pm, ESPN+ | | at San Francisco | W 74–65 | 9–5 (1–0) | 24 – Villa | 10 – Sow | 4 – Shuler | Sobrato Center (286); San Francisco, CA |
| December 30, 2025; 5:00 pm, ESPN+ | | at Saint Mary's | W 63–57 | 10–5 (2–0) | 16 – Villa | 8 – Shuler | 7 – Shuler | University Credit Union Pavilion (326); Moraga, CA |
| January 2, 2026; 6:00 pm, ESPN+ | | Pacific | W 81–61 | 11–5 (3–0) | 32 – Villa | 7 – Villa | 6 – Shuler | Gill Coliseum (3,369); Corvallis, OR |
| January 8, 2026; 6:00 pm, ESPN+ | | at Washington State | W 78−64 | 12−5 (4−0) | 24 – Bolden | 7 – Sow | 7 – Shuler | Beasley Coliseum (886); Pullman, WA |
| January 10, 2026; 1:00 pm, ESPN+ | | Seattle | W 68-38 | 13-5 (5-0) | 19 – Villa | 10 – Sow | 6 – Shuler | Gill Coliseum (3,775); Corvallis, OR |
| January 15, 2026; 6:00 pm, ESPN+ | | at LMU | L 51-55 | 13-6 (5-1) | 13 – Villa | 7 – Shuler | 6 – Shuler | Gersten Pavilion; Los Angeles, CA |
| January 17, 2026; 2:00 pm, ESPN+ | | at Pepperdine | W 69-68 | 14-6 (6-1) | 25 – Villa | 6 – Tied | 6 – Shuler | Firestone Fieldhouse (558); Malibu, CA |
| January 22, 2026; 6:00 pm, ESPN+ | | Gonzaga | W 92-87 ^{OT} | 15-6 (7-1) | 31 – Villa | 11 – Williamson | 9 – Shuler | Gill Coliseum (4.257); Corvallis, OR |
| January 29, 2026; 6:00 pm, ESPN+ | | San Diego | L 43-61 | 16-6 (8-1) | 24 – Shuler | 8 – Bolden | 4 – Villa | Gill Coliseum (3,750); Corvallis, OR |
| January 31, 2026; 1:00 pm, ESPN+ | | San Francisco | W 75-53 | 17-6 (9-1) | 19 – Shuler | 9 – Williamson | 7 – Shuler | Gill Coliseum (4,381); Corvallis, OR |
| February 5, 2026; 6:00 pm, ESPN+ | | at Gonzaga | L 37-67 | 17-7 (9-2) | 9 – Bolden | 9 – Sow | 2 – Vecina | McCarthey Athletic Center (4,901); Spokane, WA |
| February 7, 2026; 2:00 pm, ESPN+ | | at Portland | L 50-53 | 17-8 (9-3) | 23 – Shuler | 7 – Tied | 3 – Villa | Chiles Center (2,002); Portland, OR |
| February 12, 2026; 6:00 pm, ESPN+ | | Santa Clara | L 70-83 | 17-9 (9-4) | 15 – Villa | 12 – Villa | 9 – Shuler | Gill Coliseum (3,949); Corvallis, OR |
| February 14, 2026; 2:00 pm, ESPN+ | | at Pacific | W 70-60 | 18-9 (10-4) | 31 – Shuler | 7 – Tied | 3 – Shuler | Alex G. Spanos Center (532); Stockton, CA |
| February 19, 2026; 6:00 pm, ESPN+ | | Portland | W 64-54 | 19-9 (11-4) | 29 – Bolden | 12 – Alonso | 6 – Tied | Gill Coliseum (3,629); Corvallis, OR |
| February 21, 2026; 1:00 pm, ESPN+ | | Washington State | W 79-51 | 20-9 (12-4) | 20 – Tied | 10 – Williamson | 4 – Shuler | Gill Coliseum (4,473); Corvallis, OR |
| February 26, 2026; 6:00 pm, ESPN+ | | at San Diego | W 83–49 | 21–9 (13–4) | 22 – Shuler | 12 – Williamson | 5 – Vecina | Jenny Craig Pavilion (339); San Diego, CA |
| February 28, 2026; 1:00 pm, ESPN+ | | LMU | L 69-71 ^{OT} | 21-10 (13-5) | 15 – Tied | 8 – Tied | 5 – Shuler | Gill Coliseum (4,452); Corvallis, OR |
WCC tournament
| March 8, 2026; 11:30 am, ESPN+ | (4) | vs. (5) Portland; Quarterfinal | W 60-50 | 22-10 | 20 – Williamson | 16 – Williamson | 6 – Villa | Orleans Arena (1,553); Paradise, NV |
| March 9, 2026; 12:00 pm, ESPN+ | (4) | vs. (1) LMU; Semifinal | W 73-67 | 23-10 | 22 – Villa | 9 – Williamson | 7 – Shuler | Orleans Arena (1,905); Paradise, NV |
| March 10, 2026; 1:00 pm, ESPN2 | (4) | vs. (2) Gonzaga; Championship | L 66-76 | 23-11 | 20 – Villa | 9 – Williamson | 5 – Shuler | Orleans Arena (3,345); Paradise, NV |
WBIT
| March 19, 2026*; 6:00 pm, ESPN+ | | (3) Wisconsin; First Round | L 58–62 | 23–12 | 23 – Bolden | 6 – Bolden | 6 – Shuler | Gill Coliseum (2,014); Corvallis, OR |
*Non-conference game. ^{#}Rankings from AP Poll. (#) Tournament seedings in parentheses. All times are in Pacific.
