= 2025–26 San Francisco Dons women's basketball team =

American college basketball season

2025–26 San Francisco Dons women's basketball
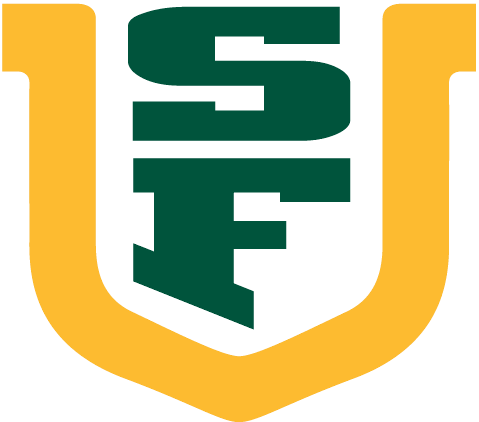

WNIT, Second Round
- Conference: West Coast Conference
- Record: 19–15 (9–9 WCC)
- Head coach: Molly Goodenbour (10th season)
- Associate head coach: Janell Jones
- Assistant coaches: Isaac Lu; Todd Kent; Ryan Yablonsky
- Home arena: Sobrato Center

2025–26 West Coast Conference women's basketball standings
	Conf.				Overall
Team	W		L	PCT	W		L	PCT
Loyola Marymount	15	–	3	.833	21	–	10	.677
Gonzaga †	14	–	4	.778	24	–	10	.706
Santa Clara	13	–	5	.722	24	–	10	.706
Oregon State	13	–	5	.722	23	–	12	.657
Portland	11	–	7	.611	20	–	14	.588
Pepperdine	10	–	8	.556	21	–	12	.636
San Francisco	9	–	9	.500	19	–	15	.559
Pacific	6	–	12	.333	11	–	19	.367
Washington State	6	–	12	.333	9	–	25	.265
Saint Mary's	6	–	12	.333	15	–	17	.469
San Diego	4	–	14	.222	11	–	22	.333
Seattle	1	–	17	.056	5	–	25	.167
† 2026 WCC tournament winner As of March 20, 2026

The 2025–26 San Francisco Dons women's basketball team represents the University of San Francisco during the 2025–26 NCAA Division I women's basketball season. The Dons, led by tenth-year head coach Molly Goodenbour, play their home games at the Sobrato Center in San Francisco, California as members of the West Coast Conference.

== Previous season ==
The Dons finished the 2024–25 season 15–16, 11–9 in WCC play, to finish in fifth place. They defeated Loyola Marymount in the third round, before falling to eventual tournament champions Oregon State in the quarterfinals of the WCC tournament.

== Preseason ==
On October 23, 2025, the West Coast Conference released their preseason poll. San Francisco was picked to finish sixth in the conference.

=== Preseason rankings ===
WCC Preseason Poll
Place	Team	Votes
1	Oregon State	119 (9)
2	Gonzaga	111 (3)
3	Washington State	94
4	Portland	91
5	Santa Clara	84
6	San Francisco	70
7	Saint Mary's	55
8	Pacific	52
9	Loyola Marymount	38
10	Pepperdine	36
11	San Diego	31
12	Seattle	11
(#) first-place votes

=== Preseason All-WCC Team ===
No players were named to the Preseason All-WCC Team.

== Roster ==
2025–26 San Francisco Dons women's basketball team
Players
Coaches

Pos.	#	Name	Height	Year	Previous school	Hometown
G	2	Mara Neira	5 ft 9 in (1.75 m)	GS	Appalachian State	Baiona, Spain
F	3	Noelia Mouriño	6 ft 2 in (1.88 m)	Fr	Segle XXI Barcelona	O Porriño, Spain
G	4	Meghan McIntyre	5 ft 6 in (1.68 m)	GS	Southern Oregon	Garden Grove, California
F	7	Nevaeh Ferrara Horne	6 ft 2 in (1.88 m)	Jr	North Dakota	Regina, Saskatchewan
G	9	Aina Cargol	5 ft 9 in (1.75 m)	Fr	Spar Girona	Olot, Spain
G	10	Amy Pateman	5 ft 8 in (1.73 m)	Fr	Westlake Girls High School	Auckland, New Zealand
F	12	Nataša Taušová	6 ft 3 in (1.91 m)	Fr	Piešťanské Čajky	Poprad, Slovakia
F	14	Michelle Ugwah	6 ft 1 in (1.85 m)	RS So	Morehead State	Cork, Ireland
G	21	Olivia Williams	6 ft 1 in (1.85 m)	RS Sr	UC Irvine	South San Francisco, California
G	22	Paula Tirado	5 ft 7 in (1.7 m)	RS So	IES Damià Campeny	Mataró, Spain
G	23	Candy Edokpaigbe	6 ft 0 in (1.83 m)	So	Seattle	Naples, Italy
F	24	Sol Castro	6 ft 1 in (1.85 m)	GS	Robert Morris	Río Colorado, Argentina
F	32	Sophia Priestley	6 ft 2 in (1.88 m)	Fr	Ullern IF Oslo	Oslo, Norway

Head coach

- Molly Goodenbour (Stanford)

Assistant coach(es)

- Janell Jones (Oklahoma Christian)
- Isaac Lu (San Francisco)
- Todd Kent (Eastern Washington)
- Ryan Yablonsky (Texas)

Legend

- (C) Team captain
- (S) Suspended
- (I) Ineligible
- (W) Walk-on
- Injured
- Current redshirt

Roster
Last update: January 10, 2026

== Schedule and results ==
Date time, TV	Rank^{#}	Opponent^{#}	Result	Record	High points	High rebounds	High assists	Site (attendance) city, state
Non-conference regular season
November 5, 2025*; 4:30 pm, ESPN+		UNC Greensboro	W 64–40	1–0	26 – Edokpaigbe	11 – Ferrara Horne	7 – McIntyre	Sobrato Center (248); San Francisco, CA
November 9, 2025*; 1:00 pm, MWN		at Boise State	L 68–83	1–1	13 – Tirado	7 – Mouriño	3 – Tied	ExtraMile Arena (1,761); Boise, ID
November 14, 2025*; 6:00 pm, ESPN+		Seton Hall	L 66–80	1–2	20 – Cargol	5 – Tied	3 – Tied	Sobrato Center (367); San Francisco, CA
November 16, 2025*; 2:00 pm, ESPN+		UC San Diego	W 80–69	2–2	24 – Edokpaigbe	10 – Edokpaigbe	6 – Cargol	Sobrato Center (569); San Francisco, CA
November 20, 2025*; 6:00 pm, ESPN+		at Long Beach State	W 68−55	3−2	22 – Edokpaigbe	17 – Mouriño	4 – Tied	LBS Financial Credit Union Pyramid (511); Long Beach, CA
November 25, 2025*; 6:00 pm, ESPN+		Lehigh	W 89−84	4−2	25 – Edokpaigbe	8 – Castro	10 – Cargol	Sobrato Center; San Francisco, CA
November 30, 2025*; 2:00 pm, ESPN+		Cal State Monterey Bay	W 92–52	5–2	16 – McIntyre	7 – Castro	7 – McIntyre	Sobrato Center (358); San Francisco, CA
December 5, 2025*; 3:00 pm		vs. Nevada; Briann January Classic	W 68–45	6–2	16 – Edokpaigbe	10 – Mouriño	4 – Cargol	Mullett Arena (142); Tempe, AZ
December 6, 2025*; 1:30 pm, ESPN+		at Arizona State; Briann January Classic	L 44–67	6–3	17 – Edokpaigbe	5 – Edokpaigbe	3 – Cargol	Mullett Arena (2,414); Tempe, AZ
December 13, 2025*; 2:00 pm, ESPN+		Colorado State	L 52–69	6–4	14 – Taušová	6 – Neira	3 – Mouriño	Sobrato Center (156); San Francisco, CA
December 17, 2025*; 4:00 pm, ESPN+		Sacramento State; USF Legacy	W 61–55	7–4	14 – Cargol	6 – Tied	7 – Cargol	Chase Center (219); San Francisco, CA
WCC regular season
December 28, 2025; 2:00 pm, ESPN+		Oregon State	L 65−74	7−5 (0–1)	15 – Cargol	6 – Tied	3 – Mouriño	Sobrato Center (286); San Francisco, CA
December 30, 2025; 6:00 pm, ESPN+		Portland	W 67–64	8–5 (1–1)	16 – Neira	13 – Castro	6 – Cargol	Sobrato Center (267); San Francisco, CA
January 2, 2026; 6:00 pm, ESPN+		at San Diego	W 59–55	9–5 (2–1)	17 – Edokpaigbe	9 – Mouriño	6 – Cargol	Jenny Craig Pavilion (385); San Diego, CA
January 4, 2026; 2:00 pm, ESPN+		at Loyola Marymount	W 85–82 ^{OT}	10–5 (3–1)	19 – Neira	7 – Mouriño	8 – Cargol	Gersten Pavilion (227); Los Angeles, CA
January 8, 2026; 6:00 pm, ESPN+		Santa Clara	L 67–77	10–6 (3–2)	19 – Edokpaigbe	11 – Mouriño	7 – Cargol	Sobrato Center (257); San Francisco, CA
January 15, 2026; 6:00 pm, ESPN+		at Gonzaga	L 69-82	10-7 (3-3)	24 – Edokpaigbe	8 – Edokpaigbe	6 – Cargol	McCarthey Athletic Center (4,765); Spokane, WA
January 17, 2026; 6:00 pm, ESPN+		at Washington State	W 85-72	11-7 (4-3)	21 – Cargol	12 – Mouriño	7 – Cargol	Beasley Coliseum (900); Pullman, WA
January 22, 2026; 6:00 pm, ESPN+		San Diego	W 69-65	12-7 (5-3)	24 – Edokpaigbe	11 – Mouriño	5 – Cargol	Sobrato Center (326); San Francisco, CA
January 24, 2026; 2:00 pm, ESPN+		Pacific	W 68-61	13-7 (6-3)	23 – Edokpaigbe	8 – Tied	3 – Tied	Sobrato Center (265); San Francisco, CA
January 29, 2026; 6:00 pm, ESPN+		Gonzaga	L 66-74 ^{OT}	13-8 (6-4)	13 – Edokpaigbe	8 – Ugwah	5 – Cargol	Sobrato Center (463); San Francisco, CA
January 31, 2026; 1:00 pm, ESPN+		at Oregon State	L 53-75	13-9 (6-5)	13 – Tied	5 – Tied	5 – Cargol	Gill Coliseum (4,381); Corvallis, OR
February 5, 2026; 6:00 pm, ESPN+		at Seattle	W 76-67	14-9 (7-5)	24 – Edokpaigbe	9 – Mourino	4 – Tied	Redhawk Center (277); Seattle, WA
February 7, 2026; 2:00 pm, ESPN+		Saint Mary's	L 55-72	14-10 (7-6)	18 – Neira	12 – Mourino	6 – Mourino	Sobrato Center (219); San Francisco, CA
February 14, 2026; 5:00 pm, ESPN+		Pepperdine	W 81-70	15-10 (8-6)	28 – Edokpaigbe	10 – Castro	8 – Cargol	Sobrato Center (304); San Francisco, CA
February 19, 2026; 6:00 pm, ESPN+		at Pacific	L 51-73	15-11 (8-7)	15 – Tausova	6 – McIntyre	2 – Tied	Alex G. Spanos Center (537); Stockton, CA
February 21, 2026; 5:00 pm, ESPN+		at Saint Mary's	W 61–60 ^{OT}	16–11 (9–7)	28 – Edokpaigbe	10 – Mourino	5 – Neira	University Credit Union Pavilion (639); Moraga, CA
February 26, 2026; 6:00 pm, ESPN+		Loyola Marymount	L 57–66	16–12 (9–8)	18 – Neira	9 – Edokpaigbe	4 – Cargol	Sobrato Center (267); San Francisco, CA
February 28, 2026; 12:00 pm, ESPN+		at Santa Clara	L 82-90 ^{OT}	16-13 (9-9)	23 – Edokpaigbe	9 – Tied	5 – Tausova	Leavey Center (455); Santa Clara, CA
WCC tournament
March 6, 2026; 2:45 pm, ESPN+	(7)	vs. (11) San Diego; Second Round	W 61-52	17-13	25 – Edokpaigbe	6 – Tied	4 – Tied	Orleans Arena (977); Paradise, NV
March 7, 2026; 2:30 pm, ESPN+	(7)	vs. (6) Pepperdine; Third Round	W 86-69	18-13	15 – Neira	7 – Tied	9 – Cargol	Orleans Arena (1,526); Paradise, NV
March 8, 2026; 2:00 pm, ESPN+	(7)	vs. (3) Santa Clara; Quarterfinal	L 69-87	18-14	20 – Edokpaigbe	4 – Tied	8 – Cargol	Orleans Arena (1,811); Paradise, NV
WNIT
March 19, 2026*; 6:00 pm, ESPN+		Utah Valley; First Round	W 80–50	19–14	20 – Edokpaigbe	5 – Tied	4 – Tied	Sobrato Center (180); San Francisco, CA
March 22, 2026*; 2:00 pm, ESPN+		at Montana State; Second Round	L 53–69	19–15	20 – Edokpaigbe	11 – Mouriño	3 – Tied	Brick Breeden Fieldhouse (2,238); Bozeman, MT
*Non-conference game. ^{#}Rankings from AP Poll. (#) Tournament seedings in parentheses. All times are in Pacific.
