= 2026 West Coast Conference women's basketball tournament =

American college basketball postseason tournament

- Classification: Division I
- Season: 2025–26
- Teams: 12
- Site: Orleans Arena; Paradise, Nevada
- Champions: Gonzaga (11th title)
- Winning coach: Lisa Fortier (5th title)
- MVP: Lauren Whittaker (Gonzaga)
- Television: ESPN+, ESPN2

2025–26 West Coast Conference women's basketball standings
	Conf.				Overall
Team	W		L	PCT	W		L	PCT
Loyola Marymount	15	–	3	.833	21	–	10	.677
Gonzaga †	14	–	4	.778	24	–	10	.706
Santa Clara	13	–	5	.722	24	–	10	.706
Oregon State	13	–	5	.722	23	–	12	.657
Portland	11	–	7	.611	20	–	15	.571
Pepperdine	10	–	8	.556	21	–	13	.618
San Francisco	9	–	9	.500	19	–	15	.559
Pacific	6	–	12	.333	11	–	19	.367
Washington State	6	–	12	.333	9	–	25	.265
Saint Mary's	6	–	12	.333	15	–	17	.469
San Diego	4	–	14	.222	11	–	22	.333
Seattle	1	–	17	.056	5	–	25	.167
† 2026 WCC tournament winner

The 2026 West Coast Conference women's basketball Tournament was the postseason women's basketball tournament for the West Coast Conference for the 2025–26 season. All tournament games were played at Orleans Arena in the Las Vegas-area community of Paradise, Nevada from March 5–10, 2026. In its final WCC season before leaving for the Pac-12 Conference in July 2026, Gonzaga won the tournament and received the conference's automatic bid to the 2026 NCAA tournament.

== Seeds ==
All 12 conference teams participated in the tournament. Teams were seeded by record within the conference, with a tiebreaker system to seed teams with identical conference records. The tiebreakers operated in the following order:

1. Head-to-head record
2. Record against the top-seeded team not involved in the tie, going down through the standings until the tie is broken
3. NET rating after the final regular-season conference games on February 28

Seed	School	Conf. record	Tiebreaker(s)
1	Loyola Marymount	16–2	
2	Gonzaga	15–3	
3	Santa Clara	13–5	1–0 vs. Oregon State
4	Oregon State	13–5	0–1 vs. Santa Clara
5	Portland	11–7	
6	Pepperdine	10–8	
7	San Francisco	9–9	
8	Pacific	6–12	2–1 vs. Saint Mary's/Washington State/1–0 vs. Washington State
9	Washington State	6–12	2–1 vs. Pacific/Saint Mary's/0–1 vs. Pacific
10	Saint Mary's	6–12	1–3 vs. Pacific/Washington State
11	San Diego	4–14	
12	Seattle	1–17	

== Schedule and results ==
Game	Time	Matchup	Score	Television
First Round - Thursday, March 5
1	12:00 p.m.	No. 9 Washington State vs. No. 12 Seattle	80–58	ESPN+
2	2:30 p.m.	No. 10 Saint Mary's vs. No. 11 San Diego	62–66	ESPN+
Second Round - Friday, March 6
3	12:00 p.m.	No. 8 Pacific vs. No. 9 Washington State	76–82	ESPN+
4	2:30 p.m.	No. 7 San Francisco vs. No. 11 San Diego	61–52	ESPN+
Third Round – Saturday, March 7
5	12:00 p.m.	No. 5 Portland vs. No. 9 Washington State	72–62	ESPN+
6	2:30 p.m.	No. 6 Pepperdine vs. No. 7 San Francisco	69–86	ESPN+
Quarterfinals - Sunday, March 8
7	11:30 a.m.	No. 4 Oregon State vs. No. 5 Portland	60–50	ESPN+
8	2:00 p.m.	No. 3 Santa Clara vs. No. 7 San Francisco	87–69	ESPN+
Semifinals - Monday, March 9
9	12:00 p.m.	No. 1 Loyola Marymount vs. No. 4 Oregon State	67–73	ESPN+
10	2:30 p.m.	No. 2 Gonzaga vs. No. 3 Santa Clara	88–60	ESPN+
Final – Tuesday, March 10
11	1:00 p.m.	No. 2 Gonzaga vs. No. 4 Oregon State	76–66	ESPN2
*Game times in PST. Rankings denote tournament seed.

== Bracket ==
First round Thursday, March 5
9	Washington State	80
12	Seattle	58
10	Saint Mary's	62
11	San Diego	66

Second round Friday, March 6
8	Pacific	76
9	Washington State	82
7	San Francisco	62
11	San Diego	51

Third round Saturday, March 7
5	Portland	72
9	Washington State	62
6	Pepperdine	69
7	San Francisco	86

Quarterfinals; Sunday, March 8
4	Oregon State	60
5	Portland	50
3	Santa Clara	87
7	San Francisco	69

Semifinals; Monday, March 9
1	Loyola Marymount	67
4	Oregon State	73
2	Gonzaga	88
3	Santa Clara	60

Championship; Tuesday, March 10
4	Oregon State	66
2	Gonzaga	76

== See also ==
- 2026 West Coast Conference men's basketball tournament
