= 2025–26 San Diego Toreros women's basketball team =

American college basketball season

2025–26 San Diego Toreros women's basketball
- Conference: West Coast Conference
- Record: 11–22 (4–14 WCC)
- Head coach: Blanche Alverson (1st season)
- Assistant coaches: Samantha Guastella; Jon Silver; Jualeah Woods
- Home arena: Jenny Craig Pavilion

2025–26 West Coast Conference women's basketball standings
	Conf.				Overall
Team	W		L	PCT	W		L	PCT
Loyola Marymount	15	–	3	.833	21	–	10	.677
Gonzaga †	14	–	4	.778	24	–	10	.706
Santa Clara	13	–	5	.722	24	–	10	.706
Oregon State	13	–	5	.722	23	–	12	.657
Portland	11	–	7	.611	20	–	15	.571
Pepperdine	10	–	8	.556	21	–	13	.618
San Francisco	9	–	9	.500	19	–	15	.559
Pacific	6	–	12	.333	11	–	19	.367
Washington State	6	–	12	.333	9	–	25	.265
Saint Mary's	6	–	12	.333	15	–	17	.469
San Diego	4	–	14	.222	11	–	22	.333
Seattle	1	–	17	.056	5	–	25	.167
† 2026 WCC tournament winner

The 2025–26 San Diego Toreros women's basketball team represents the University of San Diego during the 2025–26 NCAA Division I women's basketball season. The Toreros, led by first-year head coach Blanche Alverson, play their home games at the Jenny Craig Pavilion in San Diego, California as members of the West Coast Conference.

== Previous season ==
The Toreros finished the 2024–25 season 7–24, 2–18 in WCC play, to finish in eleventh (last) place. They defeated Pepperdine, before falling to Pacific in the second round of the WCC tournament. During the season, on February 23, 2025, the school announced that longtime head coach Cindy Fisher would not be returning after the season, ending her 20-season run with the program. On March 25, 2025, the school announced the hiring of Georgia Tech associate head coach Blanche Alverson as Fisher's successor.

== Preseason ==
On October 23, 2025, the West Coast Conference released their preseason poll. San Diego was picked to finish eleventh in the conference.

=== Preseason rankings ===
WCC Preseason Poll
Place	Team	Votes
1	Oregon State	119 (9)
2	Gonzaga	111 (3)
3	Washington State	94
4	Portland	91
5	Santa Clara	84
6	San Francisco	70
7	Saint Mary's	55
8	Pacific	52
9	Loyola Marymount	38
10	Pepperdine	36
11	San Diego	31
12	Seattle	11
(#) first-place votes

=== Preseason All-WCC Team ===
No players were named to the Preseason All-WCC Team.

== Roster ==
2025–26 San Diego Toreros women's basketball team
Players
Coaches

Pos.	#	Name	Height	Year	Previous school	Hometown
G	0	Ysabella Von Seipler	5 ft 10 in (1.78 m)	Fr	Del Oro High School	Rocklin, California
F	1	Dresha Moore	6 ft 0 in (1.83 m)	So	Leuzinger High School	Hawthorne, California
F	2	Ryanne Bahnsen-Price	6 ft 0 in (1.83 m)	Fr	Roosevelt High School	Erie, Colorado
G	3	Lilly Amor	5 ft 11 in (1.8 m)	So	Templestowe College	Melbourne, Australia
G	4	Jessica Ajayi	5 ft 10 in (1.78 m)	Fr	Kentwood High School	Kent, Washington
G	5	Lauren McCall	5 ft 6 in (1.68 m)	Jr	Timberline High School	Boise, Idaho
G	6	Kylie Ray	5 ft 8 in (1.73 m)	So	Utah	La Crescenta, California
F	10	Helen Holley	6 ft 1 in (1.85 m)	So	Michigan State	Cleveland, Ohio
F	11	Malia Tharpe	6 ft 0 in (1.83 m)	Jr	Shenton College	Cottesloe, Australia
F	12	Erica Carr	6 ft 3 in (1.91 m)	So	South Grand Prairie High School	Grand Prairie, Texas
F	15	Eva Ruse	6 ft 2 in (1.88 m)	So	Mulgrave School	North Vancouver, British Columbia
G	19	Jayden Rhodes	5 ft 11 in (1.8 m)	Sr	Morehead State	Keller, Texas
G	20	Hallie Rhodes	5 ft 11 in (1.8 m)	Sr	Morehead State	Keller, Texas
F	22	Ayla Williams	6 ft 0 in (1.83 m)	Fr	Centennial High School	Las Vegas, Nevada
G	24	Olivia Owens	5 ft 10 in (1.78 m)	Fr	Phoenix Country Day School	Columbus, Ohio

Head coach

- Blanche Alverson (Auburn)

Assistant coach(es)

- Samantha Guastella (Quinnipiac)
- Jon Silver (UCLA)
- Jualeah Woods (USC)

Legend

- (C) Team captain
- (S) Suspended
- (I) Ineligible
- (W) Walk-on
- Injured
- Current redshirt

Roster
Last update: January 13, 2026

== Schedule and results ==
Date time, TV	Rank^{#}	Opponent^{#}	Result	Record	High points	High rebounds	High assists	Site (attendance) city, state
Non-conference regular season
November 3, 2025*; 6:00 pm, ESPN+		Bethesda	W 92–23	1–0	22 – J. Rhodes	9 – Ruse	6 – Tied	Jenny Craig Pavilion (343); San Diego, CA
November 5, 2025*; 11:00 am, ESPN+		at UC Irvine	L 54–72	1–1	23 – Ray	9 – Holley	1 – Tied	Bren Events Center (1,204); Irvine, CA
November 8, 2025*; 2:00 pm, ESPN+		at Cal State Northridge	L 48–63	1–2	20 – Ray	9 – Ray	3 – Ray	Premier America Credit Union Arena (310); Northridge, CA
November 13, 2025*; 6:00 pm, ESPN+		Arizona State	L 47–79	1–3	14 – Owens	6 – Tied	4 – Owens	Jenny Craig Pavilion (619); San Diego, CA
November 17, 2025*; 5:30 pm, MWN		at Colorado State	L 44−71	1−4	21 – Ray	8 – Tied	2 – Tied	Moby Arena (1,580); Fort Collins, CO
November 24, 2025*; 11:00 am, ESPN+		New Mexico State	W 57−48	2−4	17 – Owens	14 – Williams	6 – Owens	Jenny Craig Pavilion (357); San Diego, CA
November 29, 2025*; 3:00 pm		vs. Little Rock; Thanksgiving Tournament MTE	L 37–51	2–5	10 – Owens	8 – Tied	1 – Tied	Desert Financial Arena (500); Tempe, AZ
November 30, 2025*; 10:00 am		vs. Southeast Missouri State; Thanksgiving Tournament MTE	W 65–55	3–5	20 – Ruse	9 – Tied	6 – Tied	Desert Financial Arena (192); Tempe, AZ
December 3, 2025*; 11:00 am, ESPN+		Binghamton	L 55–63	3–6	25 – H. Rhodes	16 – Williams	2 – Tied	Jenny Craig Pavilion (1,027); San Diego, CA
December 7, 2025*; 2:00 pm, ESPN+		Utah State	W 70–66	4–6	25 – Owens	18 – Williams	4 – H. Rhodes	Jenny Craig Pavilion (389); San Diego, CA
December 10, 2025*; 9:00 am, B1G+		at Wisconsin	L 46–74	4–7	17 – Ray	7 – Williams	2 – J. Rhodes	Kohl Center (5,653); Madison, WI
December 14, 2025*; 2:00 pm, ESPN+		UC Riverside	W 63−56	5−7	18 – Ray	9 – Tied	5 – H. Rhodes	Jenny Craig Pavilion (871); San Diego, CA
December 20, 2025*; 2:00 pm, ESPN+		Cal State Fullerton	W 56–55	6–7	13 – Owens	10 – Moore	5 – H. Rhodes	Jenny Craig Pavilion (257); San Diego, CA
WCC regular season
December 28, 2025; 1:00 pm, ESPN+		at Santa Clara	L 46–68	6–8 (0–1)	10 – Ray	8 – Williams	3 – Tied	Leavey Center (356); Santa Clara, CA
December 30, 2025; 2:00 pm, ESPN+		at Pacific	L 68–72	6–9 (0–2)	29 – Ray	8 – Ray	4 – Ray	Alex G. Spanos Center (372); Stockton, CA
January 2, 2026; 6:00 pm, ESPN+		San Francisco	L 55–59	6–10 (0–3)	24 – Ray	9 – Ray	5 – Ray	Jenny Craig Pavilion (385); San Diego, CA
January 4, 2026; 2:00 pm, ESPN+		Saint Mary's	L 49–57	6–11 (0–4)	17 – Ray	10 – Ruse	5 – Ray	Jenny Craig Pavilion (349); San Diego, CA
January 8, 2026; 6:00 pm, ESPN+		at Seattle	L 62–68	6–12 (0–5)	23 – Ray	12 – Moore	5 – Ray	Redhawk Center (243); Seattle, WA
January 10, 2026; 2:00 pm, ESPN+		Pepperdine	W 54–51	7–12 (1–5)	16 – H. Rhodes	11 – Owens	3 – Ray	Jenny Craig Pavilion (541); San Diego, CA
January 17, 2026; 2:00 pm, ESPN+		at Gonzaga	L 42–87	7–13 (1–6)	13 – Ray	3 – Tied	1 – Tied	McCarthey Athletic Center (5,166); Spokane, WA
January 22, 2026; 6:00 pm, ESPN+		at San Francisco	L 65–69	7–14 (1–7)	27 – Ray	13 – Ray	2 – Tied	Sobrato Center (326); San Francisco, CA
January 24, 2026; 2:00 pm, ESPN+		Loyola Marymount	W 69–60	8–14 (2–7)	26 – Ray	12 – Ruse	7 – Rhodes	Jenny Craig Pavilion (955); San Diego, CA
January 29, 2026; 6:00 pm, ESPN+		at Oregon State	L 43–61	8–15 (2–8)	12 – Owens	9 – Owens	2 – Rhodes	Gill Coliseum (3,720); Corvallis, OR
January 31, 2026; 5:00 pm, ESPN+		at Portland	L 59–64	8–16 (2–9)	27 – Owens	10 – Ruse	4 – Owens	Chiles Center (762); Portland, OR
February 5, 2026; 6:00 pm, ESPN+		Washington State	L 76–80	8–17 (2–10)	31 – Owens	12 – Owens	6 – Owens	Jenny Craig Pavilion (922); San Diego, CA
February 7, 2026; 2:00 pm, ESPN+		Seattle	W 71–54	9–17 (3–10)	20 – Tied	18 – Ruse	7 – Owens	Jenny Craig Pavilion (866); San Diego, CA
February 12, 2026; 6:00 pm, ESPN+		Gonzaga	L 56–66	9–18 (3–11)	25 – Ray	11 – Owens	7 – Owens	Jenny Craig Pavilion (585); San Diego, CA
February 19, 2026; 6:00 pm, ESPN+		at Pepperdine	L 55–76	9–19 (3–12)	18 – Ray	6 – Ray	3 – Ray	Firestone Fieldhouse (377); Malibu, CA
February 21, 2026; 4:00 pm, ESPN+		at Loyola Marymount	L 61–74	9–20 (3–13)	17 – Ray	5 – Tied	4 – Ray	Gersten Pavilion (432); Los Angeles, CA
February 26, 2026; 6:00 pm, ESPN+		Oregon State	L 49–83	9–21 (3–14)	13 – Owens	7 – Owens	4 – Ray	Jenny Craig Pavilion (339); San Diego, CA
February 28, 2026; 2:00 pm, ESPN+		Pacific	W 64-59	10-21 (4-14)	18 – Rhodes	10 – Owens	4 – Owens	Jenny Craig Pavilion (1,988); San Diego, CA
WCC tournament
March 5, 2026; 2:30 pm, ESPN+	(11)	vs. (10) Saint Mary's; First Round	W 66-62	11-21	22 – Rhodes	10 – Ray	2 – Tied	Orleans Arena (708); Paradise, NV
March 6, 2026; 2:45 pm, ESPN+	(11)	vs. (7) San Francisco; Second Round	L 52-61	11-22	16 – Owens	9 – Ruse	4 – Owens	Orleans Arena (977); Paradise, NV
*Non-conference game. ^{#}Rankings from AP Poll. (#) Tournament seedings in parentheses. All times are in Pacific.
