= 2025–26 Portland Pilots women's basketball team =

American college basketball season

2025–26 Portland Pilots women's basketball
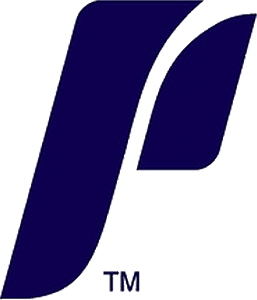

WNIT, Super 16
- Conference: West Coast Conference
- Record: 20–15 (11–7 WCC)
- Head coach: Michael Meek (7th season)
- Assistant coaches: Tom Batsell; Sharon Rissmiller; Jerod Gibson; Kianna Hamilton
- Home arena: Chiles Center

2025–26 West Coast Conference women's basketball standings
	Conf.				Overall
Team	W		L	PCT	W		L	PCT
Loyola Marymount	15	–	3	.833	21	–	10	.677
Gonzaga †	14	–	4	.778	24	–	10	.706
Santa Clara	13	–	5	.722	24	–	10	.706
Oregon State	13	–	5	.722	23	–	12	.657
Portland	11	–	7	.611	20	–	15	.571
Pepperdine	10	–	8	.556	21	–	13	.618
San Francisco	9	–	9	.500	19	–	15	.559
Pacific	6	–	12	.333	11	–	19	.367
Washington State	6	–	12	.333	9	–	25	.265
Saint Mary's	6	–	12	.333	15	–	17	.469
San Diego	4	–	14	.222	11	–	22	.333
Seattle	1	–	17	.056	5	–	25	.167
† 2026 WCC tournament winner

The 2025–26 Portland Pilots women's basketball team represented the University of Portland in the 2025–26 NCAA Division I women's basketball season. The Pilots were led by seventh-year head coach Michael Meek and played their home games at the Chiles Center in Portland, Oregon as members of the West Coast Conference (WCC).

== Previous season ==
The Pilots finished the 2024–25 season 31–5, 17–3 in WCC play, to finish in a tie for first place with Gonzaga. As the second seed in the WCC tournament, they beat third seed Washington State in the semifinals, but lost to fourth seed Oregon State in the championship game. They were invited to the WBIT, where they beat Stanford in the first round and Seton Hall in the second round, but lost to Villanova in the quarterfinals.

== Preseason ==
On October 23, 2025, the West Coast Conference released their preseason poll. Portland was picked to finish fourth in the conference.

=== Preseason rankings ===
WCC Preseason Poll
Place	Team	Votes
1	Oregon State	119 (9)
2	Gonzaga	111 (3)
3	Washington State	94
4	Portland	91
5	Santa Clara	84
6	San Francisco	70
7	Saint Mary's	55
8	Pacific	52
9	Loyola Marymount	38
10	Pepperdine	36
11	San Diego	31
12	Seattle	11
(#) first-place votes

=== Preseason All-WCC Team ===
Preseason All-WCC Team
Player	Year	Position
Dyani Ananiev	Sophomore	Guard

== Roster ==
2025–26 Portland Pilots women's basketball team
Players
Coaches

Pos.	#	Name	Height	Year	Previous school	Hometown
F	00	Goundo Diakite Bayo	6 ft 1 in (1.85 m)	Fr	IES Carles Vallbona	Barcelona, Spain
G	2	Dyani Ananiev	6 ft 2 in (1.88 m)	RS So	Wyndham College	St Andrews, Australia
G	3	Florence Dallow	6 ft 2 in (1.88 m)	RS So	Epsom Girls' Grammar School	Auckland, New Zealand
G	5	Aubrey Herrin	6 ft 1 in (1.85 m)	Fr	Kamiakin HS	Kennewick, WA
G	7	Tiffany Barbosa	5 ft 10 in (1.78 m)	So	RIG Lulea	Stockholm, Sweden
C	9	Jada Kennedy	6 ft 5 in (1.96 m)	Fr	Siena College	Melbourne, Australia
G	10	Natalie Fraley	6 ft 0 in (1.83 m)	Sr	Kelso HS; Utah State	Kelso, WA
G	12	Brynn Smith	6 ft 0 in (1.83 m)	Fr	Willamette HS	Eugene, OR
G	14	Caitlin Monahan	5 ft 10 in (1.78 m)	RS Fr	Mercer Island HS	Mercer Island, WA
G	17	Nicole Anderson	5 ft 8 in (1.73 m)	GS	Rosary Academy; LMU	Eastvale, CA
F	20	Lainey Spear	6 ft 2 in (1.88 m)	Jr	Beaverton HS	Portland, OR
G	22	Rhyan Mogel	5 ft 10 in (1.78 m)	Jr	Clackamas HS	Happy Valley, OR
G	35	Camille Dake	6 ft 0 in (1.83 m)	Fr	Rancho Buena Vista HS	Vista, CA
F/C	42	Ella Zimmerman	6 ft 4 in (1.93 m)	So	Redondo Union HS	Redondo Beach, CA
F/C	44	Julia Dalan	6 ft 3 in (1.91 m)	Fr	W. F. West HS	Centralia, WA

Head coach

- Michael Meek (Eastern Oregon)

Assistant coach(es)

- Tom Batsell (Pacific)
- Sharon Rissmiller (Portland)
- Jerod Gibson (Portland State)
- Kianna Hamilton (Portland)

Legend

- (C) Team captain
- (S) Suspended
- (I) Ineligible
- (W) Walk-on
- Injured
- Current redshirt

Roster

== Schedule and results ==
Date time, TV	Rank^{#}	Opponent^{#}	Result	Record	High points	High rebounds	High assists	Site (attendance) city, state
Non-conference regular season
November 4, 2025*; 6:00 p.m., ESPN+		Willamette	W 95–43	1–0	12 – Smith	6 – Spear	4 – Fraley	Chiles Center (617); Portland, OR
November 7, 2025*; 6:00 p.m., KUNP/ESPN+		Montana State	L 72–86	1–1	17 – Mogel	6 – Herrin	4 – Mogel	Chiles Center (851); Portland, OR
November 11, 2025*; 6:00 p.m., ESPN+		Warner Pacific	W 107–26	2–1	14 – Dallow	7 – Kennedy	5 – Smith	Chiles Center (576); Portland, OR
November 18, 2025*; 7:00 p.m., B1G+		at No. 11 USC	L 51–78	2–2	11 – Spear	8 – Dallow	3 – 3 tied	Galen Center (2,947); Los Angeles, CA
November 21, 2025*; 3:30 p.m.		vs. Idaho State; Bank of Hawai'i Classic	L 57–58	2–3	16 – Ananiev	9 – Spear	4 – Kennedy	Stan Sheriff Center (2,784); Honolulu, HI
November 23, 2025*; 4:30 p.m., ESPN+		at Hawaii; Bank of Hawai'i Classic	L 61−66	2−4	16 – Mogel	8 – Dalan	5 – Ananiev	Stan Sheriff Center (1,957); Honolulu, HI
November 29, 2025*; 3:00 p.m., ESPN+		Nevada; Portland Invitational	W 65−52	3−4	13 – Ananiev	8 – 2 tied	4 – 2 tied	Chiles Center (547); Portland, OR
November 30, 2025*; 3:00 p.m., ESPN+		Eastern Washington; Portland Invitational	W 73–58	4–4	11 – Dallow	12 – Dalan	8 – Mogel	Chiles Center (421); Portland, OR
December 6, 2025*; 5:00 p.m., KUNP/ESPN+		BYU	L 53–87	4–5	13 – Dalan	4 – 2 tied	5 – Mogel	Chiles Center (1,403); Portland, OR
December 11, 2025*; 6:00 p.m., ESPN+		at Long Beach State	W 94–58	5–5	14 – 2 tied	12 – Dalan	6 – Mogel	LBS Financial Credit Union Pyramid (620); Long Beach, CA
December 18, 2025*; 11:00 a.m., B1G+		at Oregon	L 59–85	5–6	15 – Spear	5 – 2 tied	8 – Mogel	Matthew Knight Arena (6,279); Eugene, OR
December 21, 2025*; 2:00 p.m., ESPN+		at Portland State	W 98–53	6–6	17 – Ananiev	8 – Anderson	5 – 2 tied	Viking Pavilion (651); Portland, OR
WCC regular season
December 28, 2025; 2:00 p.m., ESPN+		at Saint Mary's	W 63−59	7−6 (1–0)	11 – 2 tied	7 – Dallow	7 – Mogel	University Credit Union Pavilion (408); Moraga, CA
December 30, 2025; 6:00 p.m., ESPN+		at San Francisco	L 64–67	7–7 (1–1)	16 – Ananiev	5 – 3 tied	10 – Mogel	Sobrato Center (267); San Francisco, CA
January 2, 2026; 6:00 p.m., ESPN+		Washington State	W 62–49	8–7 (2–1)	14 – Dalan	7 – 2 tied	5 – Mogel	Chiles Center (840); Portland, OR
January 4, 2026; 2:00 p.m., ESPN+		Pacific	W 74–53	9–7 (3–1)	17 – Ananiev	10 – Ananiev	7 – Mogel	Chiles Center (967); Portland, OR
January 10, 2026; 2:00 p.m., ESPN+		at Gonzaga	L 55–69	9–8 (3–2)	14 – Anderson	4 – Dalan	4 – Ananiev	McCarthey Athletic Center (5,713); Spokane, WA
January 15, 2026; 6:00 p.m., ESPN+		at Santa Clara	W 73–66	10–8 (4–2)	22 – Ananiev	8 – Dalan	5 – Mogel	Leavey Center (346); Santa Clara, CA
January 17, 2026; 5:00 p.m., ESPN+		Seattle	W 83–57	11–8 (5–2)	17 – Spear	6 – Ananiev	6 – Ananiev	Chiles Center (790); Portland, OR
January 22, 2026; 6:00 p.m., ESPN+		at LMU	L 68–77	11–9 (5–3)	13 – Dallow	9 – Kennedy	7 – Mogel	Gersten Pavilion; Los Angeles, CA
January 24, 2026; 5:00 p.m., ESPN+		at Pepperdine	L 68–86	11–10 (5–4)	18 – Zimmerman	5 – Zimmerman	4 – Smith	Firestone Fieldhouse (388); Malibu, CA
January 29, 2026; 6:00 p.m., KUNP/ESPN+		Saint Mary's	W 68–42	12–10 (6–4)	18 – Anderson	9 – Kennedy	6 – 2 tied	Chiles Center (618); Portland, OR
January 31, 2026; 5:00 p.m., ESPN+		San Diego	W 64–59	13–10 (7–4)	18 – Dallow	8 – Dallow	4 – Mogel	Chiles Center (762); Portland, OR
February 7, 2026; 2:00 p.m., ESPN+		Oregon State	W 53–50	14–10 (8–4)	18 – Dallow	8 – Dallow	4 – Mogel	Chiles Center (2,002); Portland, OR
February 12, 2026; 6:00 p.m., ESPN+		at Washington State	W 68–61	15–10 (9–4)	20 – Mogel	9 – Kennedy	5 – Spear	Beasley Coliseum (905); Pullman, WA
February 14, 2026; 5:00 p.m., KUNP/ESPN+		Santa Clara	L 66–77	15–11 (9–5)	20 – Spear	9 – Dallow	5 – Anderson	Chiles Center (881); Portland, OR
February 19, 2026; 6:00 p.m., ESPN+		at Oregon State	L 54–64	15–12 (9–6)	19 – Spear	10 – Dallow	4 – Mogel	Gill Coliseum (3,629); Corvallis, OR
February 21, 2026; 1:00 p.m., ESPN+		at Seattle	W 65–61	16–12 (10–6)	15 – Spear	9 – Barbosa	4 – 2 tied	Redhawk Center (428); Seattle, WA
February 26, 2026; 6:00 p.m., ESPN+		Pepperdine	L 63–70	16–13 (10–7)	15 – Dallow	15 – Dallow	5 – 2 tied	Chiles Center (608); Portland, OR
February 28, 2026; 5:00 p.m., ESPN+		Gonzaga	W 92–91 ^{OT}	17–13 (11–7)	20 – Anderson	7 – Dallow	6 – Mogel	Chiles Center (1,436); Portland, OR
WCC tournament
March 7, 2026; 12:00 p.m., ESPN+	(5)	vs. (9) Washington State; Third round	W 72–62	18–13	19 – Mogel	5 – Barbosa	5 – Mogel	Orleans Arena (1,289); Paradise, NV
March 8, 2026; 11:30 a.m., ESPN+	(5)	vs. (4) Oregon State; Quarterfinal	L 50–60	18–14	14 – Ananiev	8 – Spear	3 – 4 tied	Orleans Arena (1,553); Paradise, NV
WNIT
March 19, 2026*; 6:00 p.m., ESPN+		Sam Houston; First round	W 62–59	19–14	18 – Ananiev	9 – Spear	6 – Mogel	Chiles Center (502); Portland, OR
March 22, 2026*; 3:00 p.m., ESPN+		Lamar; Second round	W 78–68	20–14	21 – Ananiev	7 – Spear	5 – Dallow	Chiles Center (512); Portland, OR
March 26, 2026*; 6:00 p.m.		at Montana State; Super 16	L 54–72	20–15	14 – Smith	12 – Dallow	4 – Mogel	Worthington Arena (3,897); Bozeman, MT
*Non-conference game. ^{#}Rankings from AP poll. (#) Tournament seedings in parentheses. All times are in Pacific.

== See also ==
- 2025–26 Portland Pilots men's basketball team

== Rankings ==
Ranking movements
	Week																			
Poll	Pre	1	2	3	4	5	6	7	8	9	10	11	12	13	14	15	16	17	18	Final
AP																				Not released
Coaches																				
