= 2025–26 Seattle Redhawks women's basketball team =

American college basketball season

2025–26 Seattle Redhawks women's basketball
- Conference: West Coast Conference
- Record: 5–25 (1–17 WCC)
- Head coach: Skyler Young (3rd season)
- Assistant coaches: Rachel Swartz; John Motherwell; Briana Gray
- Home arena: Redhawk Center

2025–26 West Coast Conference women's basketball standings
| | Conf. | | | | Overall |
| Team | W | | L | PCT | W | | L | PCT |
|---|---|---|---|---|---|---|---|---|
| Loyola Marymount | 15 | – | 3 | .833 | 21 | – | 9 | .700 |
| Gonzaga † | 14 | – | 4 | .778 | 24 | – | 9 | .727 |
| Santa Clara | 13 | – | 5 | .722 | 24 | – | 9 | .727 |
| Oregon State | 13 | – | 5 | .722 | 23 | – | 11 | .676 |
| Portland | 11 | – | 7 | .611 | 18 | – | 14 | .563 |
| Pepperdine | 10 | – | 8 | .556 | 19 | – | 12 | .613 |
| San Francisco | 9 | – | 9 | .500 | 18 | – | 14 | .563 |
| Pacific | 6 | – | 12 | .333 | 11 | – | 19 | .367 |
| Washington State | 6 | – | 12 | .333 | 9 | – | 25 | .265 |
| Saint Mary's | 6 | – | 12 | .333 | 15 | – | 17 | .469 |
| San Diego | 4 | – | 14 | .222 | 11 | – | 22 | .333 |
| Seattle | 1 | – | 17 | .056 | 5 | – | 25 | .167 |
† 2026 WCC tournament winner As of March 10, 2026

The 2025–26 Seattle Redhawks women's basketball team represents Seattle University during the 2025–26 NCAA Division I women's basketball season. The Redhawks, led by third-year head coach Skyler Young, play their home games at the Redhawk Center in Seattle, Washington as first-year members of the West Coast Conference.

== Previous season ==
The Redhawks finished the 2024–25 season 4–26, 1–15 in WAC play, to finish in a tie for eighth (last) place. They were defeated by Utah Tech in the first round of the WAC tournament. This was Seattle's final season as members of the Western Athletic Conference (WAC).

== Preseason ==
On October 23, 2025, the West Coast Conference released their preseason poll. Seattle was picked to finish twelfth (last) in the conference.

=== Preseason rankings ===
WCC Preseason Poll
| Place | Team | Votes |
|---|---|---|
| 1 | Oregon State | 119 (9) |
| 2 | Gonzaga | 111 (3) |
| 3 | Washington State | 94 |
| 4 | Portland | 91 |
| 5 | Santa Clara | 84 |
| 6 | San Francisco | 70 |
| 7 | Saint Mary's | 55 |
| 8 | Pacific | 52 |
| 9 | Loyola Marymount | 38 |
| 10 | Pepperdine | 36 |
| 11 | San Diego | 31 |
| 12 | Seattle | 11 |
(#) first-place votes

=== Preseason All-WCC Team ===
No players were named to the Preseason All-WCC Team.

== Roster ==
2025–26 Seattle Redhawks women's basketball team
Players
Coaches

| Pos. | # | Name | Height | Year | Previous school | Hometown |
|---|---|---|---|---|---|---|
| G | 3 | Ella Brubaker | 6 ft 0 in (1.83 m) | GS | Pepperdine | University Place, Washington |
| F | 4 | Fia Proctor | 6 ft 2 in (1.88 m) | So | Wyoming | Bothell, Washington |
| G | 5 | Dylan Mogel | 5 ft 9 in (1.75 m) | Fr | Clackamas High School | Clackamas, Oregon |
| F | 6 | Andjela Bigovic | 6 ft 5 in (1.96 m) | GS | Tarleton State | Herceg Novi, Montenegro |
| C | 7 | Lucija Milkovic | 6 ft 6 in (1.98 m) | Jr | Missouri | Šibenik, Croatia |
| G | 8 | Chloe Emanga | 5 ft 9 in (1.75 m) | Fr | BasCats USC Heidelberg | Marbach am Neckar, Germany |
| G | 9 | Jana Vesic | 5 ft 7 in (1.7 m) | Fr | Central Pointe Christian Academy | Belgrade, Serbia |
| F | 14 | Tamia Stricklin | 6 ft 0 in (1.83 m) | RS Sr | Fresno State | Renton, Washington |
| G | 21 | Aaliyah Ibarra | 5 ft 8 in (1.73 m) | Sr | Utah Tech | Las Vegas, Nevada |
| G | 22 | Lucy Larson | 5 ft 10 in (1.78 m) | So | West Seattle High School | Seattle, Washington |
| G | 24 | Sydnie Rodriguez | 6 ft 0 in (1.83 m) | So | Owyhee High School | Boise, Idaho |

Head coach

- Skyler Young (Western Michigan)

Assistant coach(es)

- Rachel Swartz (Missouri State)
- John Motherwell (Michigan)
- Briana Gray (Weber State)

Legend

- (C) Team captain
- (S) Suspended
- (I) Ineligible
- (W) Walk-on
- Injured
- Current redshirt

Roster
Last update: January 13, 2026

== Schedule and results ==
| Date time, TV | Rank^{#} | Opponent^{#} | Result | Record | High points | High rebounds | High assists | Site (attendance) city, state |
Non-conference regular season
| November 3, 2025*; 5:00 pm, B1G+ | | at Washington | L 43–90 | 0–1 | 12 – Stricklin | 7 – Milkovic | 3 – Mogel | Alaska Airlines Arena (2,975); Seattle, WA |
| November 5, 2025*; 6:00 pm, ESPN+ | | Northwest | W 86–56 | 1–1 | 17 – Brubaker | 9 – Stricklin | 7 – Tied | Redhawk Center (234); Seattle, WA |
| November 9, 2025*; 12:00 pm, ESPN+ | | UC Santa Barbara | L 49–89 | 1–2 | 17 – Vesic | 10 – Stricklin | 3 – Vesic | Redhawk Center (312); Seattle, WA |
| November 11, 2025*; 6:30 pm, MWN | | at Fresno State | L 53–78 | 1–3 | 12 – Vesic | 5 – Stricklin | 2 – Vesic | Save Mart Center (1,107); Fresno, CA |
| November 15, 2025*; 1:00 pm, ESPN+ | | Cal Poly | W 75−73 | 2−3 | 20 – Bigovic | 10 – Stricklin | 6 – Mogel | Redhawk Center (305); Seattle, WA |
| November 21, 2025*; 5:30 pm, MWN | | at Boise State | L 65−86 | 2−4 | 17 – Brubaker | 5 – Tied | 4 – Vesic | ExtraMile Arena (1,708); Boise, ID |
| November 28, 2025*; 10:30 am, ESPN+ | | vs. Presbyterian; FIU Thanksgiving Tournament | W 72–61 | 3–4 | 24 – Brubaker | 9 – Stricklin | 5 – Mogel | Ocean Bank Convocation Center (36); Miami, FL |
| November 30, 2025*; 10:30 am, ESPN+ | | at FIU; FIU Thanksgiving Tournament | L 59–64 | 3–5 | 15 – Brubaker | 10 – Stricklin | 5 – Tied | Ocean Bank Convocation Center (58); Miami, FL |
| December 2, 2025*; 11:00 am, ESPN+ | | Evergreen State | W 102–37 | 4–5 | 18 – Milkovic | 13 – Larson | 6 – Larson | Redhawk Center (688); Seattle, WA |
| December 13, 2025*; 1:00 pm, ESPN+ | | Cal State Bakersfield | L 51–72 | 4–6 | 16 – Stricklin | 6 – Rodriguez | 2 – Tied | Redhawk Center (291); Seattle, WA |
| December 17, 2025*; 7:00 pm, ESPN+ | | at Portland State | L 62–85 | 4–7 | 20 – Brubaker | 9 – Rodriguez | 4 – Mogel | Viking Pavilion (324); Portland, OR |
WCC regular season
| December 28, 2025; 1:00 pm, ESPN+ | | at Pacific | L 66−85 | 4−8 (0–1) | 14 – Tied | 8 – Stricklin | 2 – Tied | Alex G. Spanos Center (365); Stockton, CA |
| December 30, 2025; 6:00 pm, ESPN+ | | at Santa Clara | L 65–94 | 4–9 (0–2) | 17 – Stricklin | 7 – Tied | 4 – Tied | Leavey Center (331); Santa Clara, CA |
| January 2, 2026; 6:00 pm, ESPN+ | | Gonzaga | L 59–85 | 4–10 (0–3) | 15 – Brubaker | 6 – Rodriguez | 4 – Rodriguez | Redhawk Center (541); Seattle, WA |
| January 4, 2026; 1:00 pm, ESPN+ | | Washington State | L 69–73 | 4–11 (0–4) | 17 – Brubaker | 9 – Milkovic | 5 – Stricklin | Redhawk Center (432); Seattle, WA |
| January 8, 2026; 6:00 pm, ESPN+ | | San Diego | W 68–62 | 5–11 (1–4) | 20 – Tied | 11 – Rodriguez | 3 – Tied | Redhawk Center (243); Seattle, WA |
| January 10, 2026; 1:00 pm, ESPN+ | | at Oregon State | L 38–68 | 5–12 (1–5) | 11 – Stricklin | 8 – Brubaker | 3 – Vesic | Gill Coliseum (3,775); Corvallis, OR |
| January 17, 2026; 5:00 pm, ESPN+ | | at Portland | L 57-83 | 5-13 (1-6) | 15 – Stricklin | 5 – Milkovic | 3 – Tied | Chiles Center (790); Portland, OR |
| January 22, 2026; 6:00 pm, ESPN+ | | Santa Clara | L 59-93 | 5-14 (1-7) | 16 – Brubaker | 6 – Tied | 3 – Tied | Redhawk Center (483); Seattle, WA |
| January 24, 2026; 1:00 pm, ESPN+ | | Saint Mary's | L 53-67 | 5-15 (1-8) | 26 – Brubaker | 6 – Rodriguez | 2 – Tied | Redhawk Center (326); Seattle, WA |
| January 29, 2026; 6:00 pm, ESPN+ | | at Pepperdine | L 63-90 | 5-16 (1-9) | 19 – Vesic | 10 – Bigovic | 3 – Bigovic | Firestone Fieldhouse (301); Malibu, CA |
| January 31, 2026; 2:00 pm, ESPN+ | | at LMU | L 40-81 | 5-17 (1-10) | 12 – Brubaker | 10 – Bigovic | 2 – Bigovic | Gersten Pavilion (393); Los Angeles, CA |
| February 5, 2026; 6:00 pm, ESPN+ | | San Francisco | L 67-76 | 5-18 (1-11) | 21 – Brubaker | 6 – Emanga | 2 – Tied | Redhawk Center (277); Seattle, WA |
| February 7, 2026; 2:00 pm, ESPN+ | | at San Diego | L 54-71 | 5-19 (1-12) | 27 – Brubaker | 8 – Brubaker | 5 – Vesic | Jenny Craig Pavilion (866); San Diego, CA |
| February 16, 2026; 1:00 pm, ESPN+ | | at Saint Mary's | L 59-86 | 5-20 (1-13) | 16 – Brubaker | 7 – Stricklin | 5 – Stricklin | University Credit Union Pavilion (198); Moraga, CA |
| February 19, 2026; 6:00 pm, ESPN+ | | LMU | L 54-78 | 5-21 (1-14) | 25 – Brubaker | 7 – Stricklin | 3 – Tied | Redhawk Center (252); Seattle, WA |
| February 21, 2026; 1:00 pm, ESPN+ | | Portland | L 61-65 | 5-22 (1-15) | 20 – Brubaker | 9 – Brubaker | 3 – Brubaker | Redhawk Center (428); Seattle, WA |
| February 26, 2026; 6:00 pm, ESPN+ | | at Washington State | L 55-69 | 5-23 (1-16) | 17 – Brubaker | 9 – Tied | 3 – Bigovic | Beasley Coliseum (939); Pullman, WA |
| February 28, 2026; 1:00 pm, ESPN+ | | Pepperdine | L 67-81 | 5-24 (1-17) | 16 – Vesic | 14 – Stricklin | 2 – Tied | Redhawk Center (658); Seattle, WA |
WCC tournament
| March 5, 2026; 12:00 pm, ESPN+ | (12) | vs. (9) Washington State; First Round | L 58-80 | 5-25 | 17 – Stricklin | 11 – Stricklin | 4 – Brubaker | Orleans Arena; Paradise, NV |
*Non-conference game. ^{#}Rankings from AP Poll. (#) Tournament seedings in parentheses. All times are in Pacific.
