= San Diego Toreros women's basketball =

San Diego Toreros
2025–26 San Diego Toreros women's basketball team
- University: University of San Diego
- Head coach: Blanche Alverson (1st season)
- Location: San Diego, California
- Arena: Jenny Craig Pavilion (capacity: 5,100)
- Conference: West Coast Conference
- Nickname: Toreros
- Colors: Navy, white, and Toreros blue

NCAA Division I tournament appearances
- 1993, 2000, 2008

Conference tournament champions
- 1993, 2000, 2008

Uniforms
Home	Away

For information on all University of San Diego sports, see San Diego Toreros

The San Diego Toreros women's basketball team is the women's college basketball program that represents the University of San Diego (USD). The Toreros compete in NCAA Division I as a member of the West Coast Conference (WCC). The team plays its home games at the Jenny Craig Pavilion.

== History ==
San Diego began play in 1980 and they joined the West Coast Conference in 1985. They have made three NCAA Tournament appearances (1993, 2000, 2008) and six WNIT appearances (2007, 2012, 2013, 2014, 2015, 2016), with a Final Four appearance in the 2012 WNIT. As of the end of the 2015–16 season, the Toreros have an all-time record of 516–523.

== NCAA tournament results ==
Year	Seed	Round	Opponent	Result
1993	11	First round	(6) Nebraska	L 58−81
2000	15	First round	(2) Notre Dame	L 61−87
2008	14	First round	(3) California	L 60−77
