= Santa Clara Broncos women's basketball =

Santa Clara Broncos
| 2025–26 Santa Clara Broncos women's basketball team |
- University: Santa Clara University
- Head coach: Loree Payne (1st season)
- Conference: West Coast Conference
- Location: Santa Clara, California
- Arena: Leavey Center (capacity: 4,500)
- Nickname: Broncos
- Colors: Maroon and white

Uniforms
| Home | Away | Alternate |

NCAA tournament round of 32
- 1992

NCAA tournament appearances
- 1992, 1994, 1998, 1999, 2002, 2005

Conference tournament champions
- 1992, 1998, 2005

Conference regular-season champions
- 1991, 1992, 1993, 1994, 1998, 1999, 2001, 2006

The Santa Clara Broncos women's basketball team represents Santa Clara University in NCAA Division I basketball competition. The team plays home games at the Leavey Center in Santa Clara, California and are members of the West Coast Conference.

== History ==
Santa Clara began play in 1963. They played in the NorCal Conference from 1978 to 1982, the NorPace Conference from 1982 to 1985, and the West Coast Athletic Conference from 1985 to 1988 before joining the West Coast Conference in 1988. They have made the NCAA Tournament six times (1992, 1994, 1998, 1999, 2002, 2005), with one victory in the Tournament being in 1992 with a 73–71 win over California. They have made the WNIT six times (1991, 2000, 2001, 2003, 2006 and 2016), with an WNIT championship in 1991.

== NCAA tournament results ==
| Year | Seed | Round | Opponent | Result |
|---|---|---|---|---|
| 1992 | #12 | First Round; Second Round | #5 California #4 Texas Tech | W 73−71; L 58−64 |
| 1994 | #11 | First Round | #6 Oregon | L 59−74 |
| 1998 | #14 | First Round | #3 Arizona | L 63−75 |
| 1999 | #13 | First Round | #4 Iowa State | L 61−74 |
| 2002 | #11 | First Round | #6 LSU | L 78−84 |
| 2005 | #15 | First Round | #2 Stanford | L 57−94 |
