= Saint Mary's Gaels women's basketball =

Saint Mary's Gaels
2025–26 Saint Mary's Gaels women's basketball team
- University: Saint Mary's College of California
- Head coach: Jeff Cammon (3rd season)
- Conference: West Coast Conference
- Location: Moraga, California
- Arena: University Credit Union Pavilion (capacity: 3,500)
- Nickname: Gaels
- Colors: Navy, red, and silver

Uniforms
Home	Away

NCAA tournament round of 32
- 2001

NCAA tournament appearances
- 1999, 2001

Conference tournament champions
- 1999, 2001

Conference regular-season champions
- 1989, 1990, 2001

The Saint Mary's Gaels women's basketball team represents Saint Mary's College in Moraga, California, competing in the West Coast Conference of the NCAA. The team plays home games in the McKeon Pavilion. They compete in the West Coast Conference.

== History ==
Saint Mary's began play in 1978. They moved to Division I play in 1987. They have won the WCC Tournament twice (1999, 2001) and the regular season title thrice (1989, 1990, 2001). They made it to the Second Round of the 2001 NCAA Tournament after beating Texas 68–64. They lost to Tennessee 92–75 in the ensuing Second Round. They made the WNIT in 2000, 2002, 2010, 2011, 2012, 2013, 2014, and 2015. As of the end of the 2021–22 season, the Gaels have an all-time record of 755–537. In 2022, the Gaels won the Women's Basketball Invitational tournament.

== Postseason results ==
=== NCAA Division I ===
Year	Seed	Round	Opponent	Result
1999	12	First round	(5) Notre Dame	L 57−61
2001	9	First round Second round	(8) Texas (1) Tennessee	W 68−64; L 75−92

=== NAIA Division I ===
The Gaels made one appearance in the NAIA Division I women's basketball tournament, with a combined record of 0–1.

Year	Seed	Round	Opponent	Result
1985		First Round	(4) Wayland Baptist	L 58–68
