= 2025–26 UC Davis Aggies women's basketball team =

American college basketball season

2025–26 UC Davis Aggies women's basketball

WNIT, First Round
- Conference: Big West Conference
- Record: 23–11 (15–5 Big West)
- Head coach: Jennifer Gross (15th season)
- Associate head coach: Joe Teramoto
- Assistant coaches: Matt Klemin; Vicki Baugh; Mia Gallo; Dejza James
- Home arena: University Credit Union Center

2025–26 Big West women's basketball standings
	Conf.				Overall
Team	W		L	PCT	W		L	PCT
UC Irvine	17	–	3	.850	26	–	7	.788
UC San Diego †	17	–	3	.850	24	–	9	.727
UC Davis	15	–	5	.750	23	–	11	.676
Hawai'i	14	–	6	.700	22	–	11	.667
Cal State Fullerton	13	–	7	.650	18	–	14	.563
UC Santa Barbara	12	–	8	.600	20	–	10	.667
UC Riverside	8	–	12	.400	11	–	21	.344
Cal State Northridge	6	–	14	.300	10	–	20	.333
Long Beach State	4	–	16	.200	5	–	25	.167
Cal State Bakersfield	2	–	18	.100	7	–	23	.233
Cal Poly	2	–	18	.100	4	–	26	.133
† 2026 Big West tournament winner

The 2025–26 UC Davis Aggies women's basketball team represents the University of California, Davis during the 2025–26 NCAA Division I women's basketball season. The Aggies, led by 15th-year head coach Jennifer Gross, play their home games at the University Credit Union Center in Davis, California as members of the Big West Conference.

This will be the Aggies' last season as members of the Big West Conference, as they will be joining the Mountain West Conference in all sports except football, effective July 1, 2026.

== Previous season ==
The Aggies finished the 2024–25 season 21–12, 13–7 in Big West play, to finish in a tie for third place. They defeated UC Riverside and UC Irvine, before falling to UC San Diego in the Big West tournament championship game.

== Preseason ==
On October 16, 2025, the Big West released their preseason poll. UC Davis was picked to finish third in the conference, with one first-place vote.

=== Preseason rankings ===
Big West Preseason Poll
Place	Team	Votes
1	Hawai'i	91 (4)
2	UC Irvine	90 (4)
3	UC Davis	83 (1)
4	UC San Diego	77 (2)
5	UC Santa Barbara	61
6	Long Beach State	57
7	UC Riverside	51
8	Cal Poly	34
9	Cal State Northridge	27
10	Cal State Fullerton	20
11	Cal State Bakersfield	14
(#) first-place votes

=== Preseason All-Big West Team ===
Preseason All-Big West Team
Player	Year	Position
Megan Norris	(redshirt) Senior	Center

== Roster ==
2025–26 UC Davis Aggies women's basketball team
Players
Coaches

Pos.	#	Name	Height	Year	Previous school	Hometown
G	1	Carrington Davis	5 ft 10 in (1.78 m)	Fr	Rialto High School	Rialto, California
G	2	Ryann Bennett	5 ft 8 in (1.73 m)	So	St. Anthony High School	Long Beach, California
G	3	Sahana Kanagasabay	5 ft 11 in (1.8 m)	RS So	Providence	Surrey, British Columbia
G	4	Nya Epps	5 ft 10 in (1.78 m)	Sr	Carondelet High School	El Cerrito, California
F	5	Ally Fitzgerald	6 ft 2 in (1.88 m)	Sr	Colorado	St. Louis, Missouri
G	6	Helen Matthews	5 ft 10 in (1.78 m)	GS	Wofford	Kaiapoi, New Zealand
G	9	Avery Sussex	5 ft 8 in (1.73 m)	So	Riverside Secondary School	Coquitlam, British Columbia
F	10	Tegan Young	6 ft 1 in (1.85 m)	Jr	Manhattan	Leominster, Massachusetts
G	11	Emmy Ersdala	6 ft 1 in (1.85 m)	Fr	Norrköping Dolphins	Västerås, Sweden
G	15	Sophie Lentfer	6 ft 0 in (1.83 m)	Fr	Grace Christian School	Anchorage, Alaska
F	21	Theoni Tsami	6 ft 1 in (1.85 m)	RS So	Kronos Agiou Dimitriou	Athens, Greece
G	23	Victoria Baker	5 ft 9 in (1.75 m)	RS Sr	UC Irvine	Austin, Texas
C	25	Megan Norris	6 ft 3 in (1.91 m)	RS Sr	Sacred Heart Prep	Menlo Park, California

Head coach

- Jennifer Gross (UC Davis)

Assistant coach(es)

- Joe Teramoto (Cal Poly)
- Matt Klemin (Cal Poly)
- Vicki Baugh (Tennessee)
- Mia Gallo (Cal State Fullerton)
- Dejza James (Arizona)

Legend

- (C) Team captain
- (S) Suspended
- (I) Ineligible
- (W) Walk-on
- Injured
- Current redshirt

Roster
Last update: December 30, 2025

== Schedule and results ==
Date time, TV	Rank^{#}	Opponent^{#}	Result	Record	High points	High rebounds	High assists	Site (attendance) city, state
Regular season
November 3, 2025*; 7:30 pm, ESPN+		Jessup	W 72–35	1–0	21 – Bennett	17 – Norris	4 – Tied	University Credit Union Center (493); Davis, CA
November 7, 2025*; 11:00 am, ESPN+		Idaho	W 89–76	2–0	21 – Bennett	11 – Norris	6 – Bennett	University Credit Union Center (5,567); Davis, CA
November 12, 2025*; 5:00 pm, ESPN+		at Weber State	W 75–52	3–0	20 – Epps	9 – Norris	5 – Norris	Dee Events Center (273); Ogden, UT
November 14, 2025*; 5:30 pm, MWN		at Boise State	L 77−91	3−1	23 – Sussex	8 – Norris	4 – Sussex	ExtraMile Arena (1,645); Boise, ID
November 20, 2025*; 7:00 pm, ACCNX		at Stanford	L 45−70	3−2	19 – Bennett	5 – Tied	3 – Norris	Maples Pavilion (2,228); Stanford, CA
November 24, 2025*; 6:30 pm, ESPN+		at Sacramento State; Causeway Cup	W 70–67 ^{OT}	4–2	25 – Bennett	9 – Norris	3 – Norris	Hornet Pavilion (597); Sacramento, CA
November 28, 2025*; 1:00 pm, ESPN+		vs. Jacksonville State; Tiger Turkey Tip-Off	W 69–59	5–2	19 – Norris	11 – Norris	5 – Tied	Alex G. Spanos Center (392); Stockton, CA
November 29, 2025*; 1:00 pm, ESPN+		vs. Milwaukee; Tiger Turkey Tip-Off	W 81–72	6–2	19 – Bennett	15 – Norris	7 – Bennett	Alex G. Spanos Center; Stockton, CA
December 4, 2025; 6:00 pm, ESPN+		Hawai'i	W 68–63	7–2 (1–0)	26 – Norris	11 – Norris	3 – Bennett	University Credit Union Center (569); Davis, CA
December 6, 2025*; 6:00 pm, ESPN+		at Gonzaga	L 72–83	7–3	23 – Tied	8 – Epps	6 – Bennett	McCarthey Athletic Center (4,686); Spokane, WA
December 14, 2025*; 2:00 pm, ESPN+		Chico State	W 74−42	8−3	13 – Young	13 – Norris	6 – Sussex	University Credit Union Center (503); Davis, CA
December 20, 2025*; 2:00 pm, ESPN+		Northern Colorado	L 47–57	8–4	13 – Tied	11 – Norris	4 – Bennett	University Credit Union Center (489); Davis, CA
January 1, 2026; 6:00 pm, ESPN+		at Cal State Northridge	W 85–66	9–4 (2–0)	26 – Bennett	16 – Norris	5 – Sussex	Premier America Credit Union Arena (415); Northridge, CA
January 3, 2026; 2:00 pm, ESPN+		at Cal State Bakersfield	W 69–59	10–4 (3–0)	28 – Epps	13 – Norris	6 – Bennett	Icardo Center (74); Bakersfield, CA
January 8, 2026; 6:00 pm, ESPN+		UC Santa Barbara	L 47–55	10–5 (3–1)	12 – Norris	18 – Norris	3 – Sussex	University Credit Union Center (582); Davis, CA
January 10, 2026; 2:00 pm, ESPN+		Cal Poly	W 87–61	11–5 (4–1)	17 – Epps	8 – Tied	4 – Norris	University Credit Union Center (706); Davis, CA
January 15, 2026; 7:00 pm, ESPN+		at Cal State Fullerton	W 73–67	12–5 (5–1)	20 – Sussex	14 – Norris	10 – Bennett	Titan Gym (154); Fullerton, CA
January 17, 2026; 2:00 pm, ESPN+		at UC Irvine	L 42–73	12–6 (5–2)	11 – Norris	15 – Norris	5 – Sussex	Bren Events Center (972); Irvine, CA
January 22, 2026; 6:00 pm, ESPN+		at UC San Diego	W 66–62	13–6 (6–2)	23 – Norris	16 – Norris	3 – Tied	LionTree Arena (537); La Jolla, CA
January 24, 2026; 4:00 pm, ESPN+		at UC Riverside	W 81–68	14–6 (7–2)	21 – Tied	12 – Norris	6 – Bennett	SRC Arena (160); Riverside, CA
January 29, 2026; 6:00 pm, ESPN+		Cal State Northridge	W 68–51	15–6 (8–2)	27 – Epps	15 – Norris	4 – Norris	University Credit Union Center (537); Davis, CA
January 31, 2026; 2:00 pm, ESPN+		Cal State Bakersfield	W 76–68	16–6 (9–2)	14 – Tied	18 – Norris	8 – Bennett	University Credit Union Center (733); Davis, CA
February 5, 2026; 6:00 pm, ESPN+		at UC Santa Barbara	L 61–69	16–7 (9–3)	17 – Bennett	13 – Norris	6 – Sussex	The Thunderdome (701); Santa Barbara, CA
February 7, 2026; 2:00 pm, ESPN+		at Cal Poly	W 59–55	17–7 (10–3)	20 – Bennett	15 – Norris	5 – Sussex	Mott Athletics Center (528); San Luis Obispo, CA
February 12, 2026; 6:00 pm, ESPN+		UC San Diego	W 88–80 ^{3OT}	18–7 (11–3)	23 – Epps	29 – Norris	6 – Bennett	University Credit Union Center (548); Davis, CA
February 14, 2026; 2:00 pm, ESPN+		at Long Beach State	W 77–66	19–7 (12–3)	26 – Bennett	14 – Norris	5 – Sussex	LBS Financial Credit Union Pyramid (655); Long Beach, CA
February 19, 2026; 6:00 pm, ESPN+		Cal State Fullerton	W 70–64	20–7 (13–3)	19 – Epps	12 – Norris	6 – Bennett	University Credit Union Center (584); Davis, CA
February 21, 2026; 2:00 pm, ESPN+		UC Riverside	W 65–56	21–7 (14–3)	20 – Sussex	16 – Norris	4 – Sussex	University Credit Union Center (678); Davis, CA
February 26, 2026; 10:00 pm, ESPN+		at Hawai'i	L 46–67	21–8 (14–4)	15 – Epps	9 – Norris	4 – Bennett	Stan Sheriff Center (1,771); Honolulu, HI
March 5, 2026; 6:00 pm, ESPN+		Long Beach State	W 59–56	22–8 (15–4)	20 – Bennett	6 – Norris	5 – Tied	University Credit Union Center (518); Davis, CA
March 7, 2026; 2:00 pm, ESPN+		UC Irvine	L 58–70	22–9 (15–5)	21 – Epps	7 – Norris	5 – Bennett	University Credit Union Center (977); Davis, CA
Big West tournament
March 12, 2026; 2:30 p.m., ESPN+	(3)	vs. (7) UC Riverside; Quarterfinals	W 70–59	23–9	23 – Sussex	14 – Norris	6 – Bennett	Lee's Family Forum (1,183); Henderson, NV
March 13, 2026; 2:30 p.m., ESPN+	(3)	vs. (2) UC San Diego; Semifinals	L 79–84	23–10	27 – Sussex	13 – Norris	4 – Tied	Lee's Family Forum (1,502); Henderson, NV
WNIT
March 19, 2026*; 6:00 p.m., ESPN+		at Pepperdine; First round	L 68–71	23–11	21 – Bennett	7 – Norris	7 – Norris	Firestone Fieldhouse (438); Malibu, CA
*Non-conference game. ^{#}Rankings from AP Poll. (#) Tournament seedings in parentheses. All times are in Pacific.
