= Angie Ned =

American basketball coach and former player

Current position
- Title: Head coach
- Team: Cal State Northridge
- Conference: Big West
- Record: 14–45 (.237)

Biographical details
- Born: February 1, 1985 (age 41)
- Education: University of California, Irvine; Concordia University Irvine

Coaching career (HC unless noted)
- 2010–2013: Perris High School
- 2013–2014: California Baptist (asst.)
- 2014–2022: California Baptist (asst.)
- 2022–2024: California Baptist (assoc. HC)
- 2024–present: Cal State Northridge

Administrative career (AD unless noted)
- 2014–2015: UC Irvine (Director of Women's Basketball Operations)

Head coaching record
- Overall: 14–45 (.237)

Angelica Ned (born February 1, 1985) is an American basketball coach and former player, who is the current head coach of the Cal State Northridge Matadors women's basketball team.

== Coaching career ==
In 2010, Ned began her coaching career as an assistant coach on the Perris High School varsity girls basketball team. In 2013, she joined the ranks of the California Baptist Lancers women's basketball team as an assistant coach, before returns to her alma mater, UC Irvine, in 2014, as director of basketball operations.

On April 29, 2024, Ned was hired as the 15th head coach in Cal State Northridge Matadors program history.

== Head coaching record ==
Record table
Season	Team	Overall	Conference	Standing	Postseason
Cal State Northridge Matadors (Big West Conference) (2024–present)
2024–25	Cal State Northridge	4–25	2–18	T-10th	
2025–26	Cal State Northridge	10–20	6–14	8th	
Cal State Northridge:		14–45 (.237)	8–32 (.200)		
Total:		14–45 (.237)			
National champion Postseason invitational champion Conference regular season champion Conference regular season and conference tournament champion Division regular season champion Division regular season and conference tournament champion Conference tournament champion
