= 2025–26 Long Beach State Beach women's basketball team =

American college basketball season

2025–26 Long Beach State Beach women's basketball
- Conference: Big West Conference
- Record: 5–25 (4–16 Big West)
- Head coach: Amy Wright (3rd season)
- Assistant coaches: Jesse Clark; Jashae Lee; Raru Archer
- Home arena: LBS Financial Credit Union Pyramid

2025–26 Big West women's basketball standings
	Conf.				Overall
Team	W		L	PCT	W		L	PCT
UC Irvine	17	–	3	.850	26	–	7	.788
UC San Diego †	17	–	3	.850	24	–	9	.727
UC Davis	15	–	5	.750	23	–	11	.676
Hawai'i	14	–	6	.700	22	–	11	.667
Cal State Fullerton	13	–	7	.650	18	–	14	.563
UC Santa Barbara	12	–	8	.600	20	–	10	.667
UC Riverside	8	–	12	.400	11	–	21	.344
Cal State Northridge	6	–	14	.300	10	–	20	.333
Long Beach State	4	–	16	.200	5	–	25	.167
Cal State Bakersfield	2	–	18	.100	7	–	23	.233
Cal Poly	2	–	18	.100	4	–	26	.133
† 2026 Big West tournament winner

The 2025–26 Long Beach State Beach women's basketball team represented California State University, Long Beach during the 2025–26 NCAA Division I women's basketball season. The Beach, led by third-year head coach Amy Wright, played their home games at the LBS Financial Credit Union Pyramid in Long Beach, California as members of the Big West Conference.

== Previous season ==
The Beach finished the 2024–25 season 16–14, 12–8 in Big West play, to finish in a tie for sixth place. They were eliminated by UC Riverside in the first round of the Big West tournament.

== Offseason ==
On October 16, 2025, the Big West released their preseason poll. Long Beach State was picked to finish sixth in the conference.

=== Preseason rankings ===
2025 Big West Preseason Poll
Place	Team	Votes
1	Hawai'i	91 (4)
2	UC Irvine	90 (4)
3	UC Davis	83 (1)
4	UC San Diego	77 (2)
5	UC Santa Barbara	61
6	Long Beach State	57
7	UC Riverside	51
8	Cal Poly Mustangs	34
9	Cal State Northridge	27
10	Cal State Fullerton	20
11	Cal State Bakersfield	14
(#) first-place votes

=== Preseason All-Big West Team ===
No players were named to the Preseason All-Big West Team.

== Roster ==
2025–26 Long Beach State Beach women's basketball team
Players
Coaches

Pos.	#	Name	Height	Year	Previous school	Hometown
G	0	Lauren Cummings	6 ft 0 in (1.83 m)	So	Billings Senior High School	Billings, MT
F	2	Rosie Akot	6 ft 2 in (1.88 m)	Fr	Sacred Heart College	North Adelaide, Australia
G	3	Tairat Samuel-Afolabi	5 ft 7 in (1.7 m)	RS Fr	Fryshuset Gymnasium	Stockholm, Sweden
F	5	Kennan Ka	6 ft 0 in (1.83 m)	Jr	Mission Hills High School	San Diego, CA
G	10	Christy Reynoso	5 ft 4 in (1.63 m)	So	Sierra Canyon School	Los Angeles, CA
G	13	Khylee Pepe	5 ft 11 in (1.8 m)	Sr	Bishop Montgomery High School	Long Beach, CA
F	20	Brelynn Brice	5 ft 10 in (1.78 m)	So	Lincoln High School	Stockton, CA
F	22	Mykelle Richards	6 ft 1 in (1.85 m)	So	Etiwanda High School	San Bernardino, CA
G	25	Morgan Mack	5 ft 10 in (1.78 m)	Fr	William S. Hart High School	Lancaster, CA
G	30	JaQuoia Jones-Brown	5 ft 6 in (1.68 m)	So	Westlake High School	Atlanta, GA
G	32	Brynna Pukis	5 ft 6 in (1.68 m)	Fr	Glacier Peak High School	Snohomish, WA
C	33	Haley Wright	6 ft 3 in (1.91 m)	So	Valencia Basket	Valencia, Spain
F	42	Judit Oliva Fernandez	6 ft 2 in (1.88 m)	So	South Florida	El Prat de Llobregat, Spain

Head coach

- Amy Wright (Arkansas)

Assistant coach(es)

- Jesse Clark (Pacific Union)
- Jashae Lee (Murray State)
- Raru Archer (Texas Southern)

Legend

- (C) Team captain
- (S) Suspended
- (I) Ineligible
- (W) Walk-on
- Injured
- Current redshirt

Roster
Last update: November 8, 2025

== Schedule and results ==
Date time, TV	Rank^{#}	Opponent^{#}	Result	Record	High points	High rebounds	High assists	Site (attendance) city, state
Exhibition
November 1, 2025*; 1:00 p.m.		Point Loma	L 71–74	–	16 – Pepe	9 – Pepe	6 – Jones-Brown	Gold Mine (452); Long Beach, CA
Regular season
November 7, 2025*; 5:30 p.m., MWN		at Wyoming	L 39–72	0–1	13 – Jones-Brown	9 – Cummings	3 – Jones-Brown	Arena-Auditorium (1,974); Laramie, WY
November 9, 2025*; 12:00 p.m., MWN		at Colorado State	L 34–73	0–2	13 – Jones-Brown	10 – Jones-Brown	2 – Tied	Moby Arena (6,405); Fort Collins, CO
November 12, 2025*; 6:00 p.m., ESPN+		California Baptist	L 60–83	0–3	19 – Jones-Brown	11 – Oliva Fernandez	5 – Pepe	LBS FCU Pyramid (628); Long Beach, CA
November 15, 2025*; 2:00 p.m., ESPN+		Sacramento State	L 54–57	0–4	29 – Jones-Brown	10 – Pepe	4 – Oliva Fernandez	LBS FCU Pyramid (612); Long Beach, CA
November 20, 2025*; 6:00 p.m., ESPN+		San Francisco	L 55–68	0–5	20 – Jones-Brown	12 – Jones-Brown	4 – Jones-Brown	LBS FCU Pyramid (511); Long Beach, CA
November 23, 2025*; 1:00 p.m., ESPN+		at Oregon State	L 55–71	0–6	16 – Jones-Brown	13 – Akot	4 – Jones-Brown	Gill Coliseum (3,190); Corvallis, OR
December 4, 2025; 6:00 p.m., ESPN+		UC Santa Barbara	L 52–67	0–7 (0–1)	15 – Jones-Brown	7 – Ka	3 – Oliva Fernandez	LBS FCU Pyramid (607); Long Beach, CA
December 6, 2025; 1:00 p.m., ESPN+		at UC San Diego	L 45–75	0–8 (0–2)	12 – Pukis	4 – Ka	3 – Ka	LionTree Arena (245); La Jolla, CA
December 11, 2025*; 6:00 p.m., ESPN+		Portland	L 58–94	0–9	25 – Jones-Brown	9 – Jones-Brown	6 – Ka	LBS FCU Pyramid (620); Long Beach, CA
December 20, 2025*; 2:00 p.m., B1G+		at No. 4 UCLA	L 44–106	0–10	10 – Jones-Brown	7 – Team	2 – Reynoso	Pauley Pavilion (3,428); Los Angeles, CA
December 22, 2025*; 12:00 p.m., ESPN+		Toledo	L 43–64	0–11	21 – Jones-Brown	6 – Akot	3 – Ka	LBS FCU Pyramid; Long Beach, CA
December 29, 2025*; 6:00 p.m., ESPN+		Hope International	W 68–62	1–11	23 – Jones-Brown	17 – Jones-Brown	8 – Oliva Fernandez	LBS FCU Pyramid (185); Long Beach, CA
January 3, 2026; 2:00 p.m., ESPN+		at Cal Poly	L 49–63	1–12 (0–3)	13 – Jones-Brown	11 – Jones-Brown	2 – Reynoso	Mott Athletics Center (496); San Luis Obispo, CA
January 8, 2026; 6:00 p.m., ESPN+		UC Irvine	L 59–78	1–13 (0–4)	18 – Akot	8 – Akot	6 – Ka	LBS FCU Pyramid (639); Long Beach, CA
January 10, 2026; 2:00 p.m., ESPN+		at Cal State Bakersfield	L 48–75	1–14 (0–5)	15 – Jones-Brown	8 – Ka	3 – Pepe	Icardo Center (62); Bakersfield, CA
January 15, 2026; 6:00 p.m., ESPN+		at UC Riverside	L 59–77	1–15 (0–6)	15 – Jones-Brown	10 – Akot	4 – Ka	SRC Arena (157); Riverside, CA
January 17, 2026; 2:00 p.m., ESPN+		Cal State Northridge	W 62–61	2–15 (1–6)	16 – Pepe	11 – Akot	3 – Akot	LBS FCU Pyramid (612); Long Beach, CA
January 22, 2026; 6:00 p.m., ESPN+		Cal State Fullerton	L 66–84	2–16 (1–7)	16 – Akot	9 – Akot	4 – Ka	LBS FCU Pyramid (618); Long Beach, CA
January 24, 2026; 1:00 p.m., ESPN+		at UC Santa Barbara	L 56–72	2–17 (1–8)	19 – Jones-Brown	14 – Jones-Brown	4 – Ka	The Thunderdome (628); Santa Barbara, CA
January 29, 2026; 6:00 p.m., ESPN+		UC Riverside	W 75–72	3–17 (2–8)	29 – Jones-Brown	6 – Ka	4 – Ka	LBS FCU Pyramid (654); Long Beach, CA
January 31, 2026; 9:00 p.m., ESPN+		at Hawaii	L 44–67	3–18 (2–9)	18 – Jones-Brown	9 – Pepe	1 – Ka	Stan Sheriff Center (4,671); Honolulu, HI
February 5, 2026; 6:00 p.m., ESPN+		UC San Diego	L 53–64	3–19 (2–10)	14 – Pukis	7 – Mack	4 – Ka	LBS FCU Pyramid (571); Long Beach, CA
February 12, 2026; 7:00 p.m., ESPN+		at Cal State Fullerton	L 62–70	3–20 (2–11)	18 – Pepe	8 – Pepe	5 – Jones-Brown	Titan Gym (432); Fullerton, CA
February 14, 2026; 2:00 p.m., ESPN+		UC Davis	L 66–77	3–21 (2–12)	21 – Jones-Brown	7 – Pepe	7 – Jones-Brown	LBS FCU Pyramid (655); Long Beach, CA
February 19, 2026; 6:00 p.m., ESPN+		at UC Irvine	L 62–77	3–22 (2–13)	24 – Jones-Brown	14 – Akot	4 – Pepe	Bren Events Center (741); Irvine, CA
February 21, 2026; 2:00 p.m., ESPN+		at Cal State Northridge	L 75–85	3–23 (2–14)	24 – Pepe	8 – Akot	4 – Ka	PACU Arena (197); Northridge, CA
February 26, 2026; 6:00 p.m., ESPN+		Cal Poly	W 67–57	4–23 (3–14)	28 – Jones-Brown	8 – Pepe	4 – Ka	LBS FCU Pyramid (532); Long Beach, CA
February 28, 2026; 2:00 p.m., ESPN+		Cal State Bakersfield	W 72–62 ^{OT}	5–23 (4–14)	25 – Jones-Brown	12 – Pepe	5 – Pukis	LBS FCU Pyramid (1,043); Long Beach, CA
March 5, 2026; 6:00 p.m., ESPN+		at UC Davis	L 56–59	5–24 (4–15)	23 – Jones-Brown	10 – Pepe	3 – Pukis	University Credit Union Center (518); Davis, CA
March 7, 2026; 2:00 p.m., ESPN+		Hawaii	L 39–74	5–25 (4–16)	10 – Ka	7 – Pepe	3 – Pepe	LBS FCU Pyramid (991); Long Beach, CA
*Non-conference game. ^{#}Rankings from AP poll. (#) Tournament seedings in parentheses. All times are in Pacific.

== See also ==
- 2025–26 Long Beach State Beach men's basketball team
