= 2025–26 Cal State Fullerton Titans women's basketball team =

American college basketball season

2025–26 Cal State Fullerton Titans women's basketball
- Conference: Big West Conference
- Record: 18–14 (13–7 Big West)
- Head coach: John Bonner (1st season)
- Assistant coaches: David Elliott; Brittany Aikens; Morgan Greene
- Home arena: Titan Gym

2025–26 Big West women's basketball standings
	Conf.				Overall
Team	W		L	PCT	W		L	PCT
UC Irvine	17	–	3	.850	26	–	7	.788
UC San Diego †	17	–	3	.850	24	–	9	.727
UC Davis	15	–	5	.750	23	–	11	.676
Hawai'i	14	–	6	.700	22	–	11	.667
Cal State Fullerton	13	–	7	.650	18	–	14	.563
UC Santa Barbara	12	–	8	.600	20	–	10	.667
UC Riverside	8	–	12	.400	11	–	21	.344
Cal State Northridge	6	–	14	.300	10	–	20	.333
Long Beach State	4	–	16	.200	5	–	25	.167
Cal State Bakersfield	2	–	18	.100	7	–	23	.233
Cal Poly	2	–	18	.100	4	–	26	.133
† 2026 Big West tournament winner

The 2025–26 Cal State Fullerton Titans women's basketball team represented California State University, Fullerton during the 2025–26 NCAA Division I women's basketball season. The Titans were led by first-year head coach John Bonner, and played their home games at Titan Gym in Fullerton, California as a member of the Big West Conference.

== Previous season ==
The Titans finished the 2024–25 season 7–23, 5–15 in Big West play, to finish in ninth place. They did not qualify for the 2025 Big West tournament.

On March 21, 2025, Titan Athletics announced their intention to not renew the contract of head coach Jeff Harada, leaving the position open. John Bonner, former head coach of the Division II Cal State Dominguez Hills Toros, was announced as Harada's successor on May 8. Bonner announced his inaugural coaching staff on July 10.

== Roster ==
2024–25 Cal State Fullerton Titans women's basketball team
Players
Coaches

Pos.	#	Name	Height	Year	Previous school	Hometown
F	0	Nicole Steiner	6 ft 2 in (1.88 m)	Fr	Los Gatos High School	Los Gatos, CA
G	1	Mimi Moon	5 ft 7 in (1.7 m)	Fr	Buena High School	Oxnard, CA
G	3	Maddy Tauro	5 ft 8 in (1.73 m)	So	Calabasas High School	Calabasas, CA
G	4	Jana Falsdottir	5 ft 6 in (1.68 m)	So	Verzlunarskóli Íslands	Keflavík, Iceland
G	5	Maxine Sutisna	5 ft 10 in (1.78 m)	Fr	Archbishop Riordan High School	Jakarta, Indonesia
G	10	Dylan Swindle	5 ft 7 in (1.7 m)	Fr	Phoenix Fire Prep School	Laveen, AZ
G/F	11	Nyemah King	5 ft 11 in (1.8 m)	Fr	Lakewood High School	Long Beach, CA
F	13	Lilliana Petersen	6 ft 2 in (1.88 m)	So	Cloud County Community College	Omaha, NE
G	22	Madelynn Muniz	5 ft 10 in (1.78 m)	RS So	Idaho	Phoenix, AZ
F	23	Talia Maxwell	6 ft 3 in (1.91 m)	Jr	Stanislaus State	Fresno, CA
G/F	24	Basak Orhan	6 ft 1 in (1.85 m)	Fr	TED Ankara Kolejliler	Ankara, Turkey
G	33	Kya Pearson	5 ft 9 in (1.75 m)	GS	Cal State Dominguez Hills	Oakland, CA
F	55	Cristina Jones	5 ft 10 in (1.78 m)	So	Cal State Dominguez Hills	Long Beach, CA

Head coach

- John Bonner (Fresno State)

Assistant coach(es)

- David Elliott (Arizona)
- Brittany Aikens (Fresno State)
- Morgan Greene (Cal State East Bay)

Legend

- (C) Team captain
- (S) Suspended
- (I) Ineligible
- (W) Walk-on
- Injured
- Current redshirt

Roster
Last update: November 8, 2025

== Schedule and results ==
Date time, TV	Rank^{#}	Opponent^{#}	Result	Record	High points	High rebounds	High assists	Site (attendance) city, state
Exhibition
October 27, 2025*; 7:00 p.m.		Claremont-Mudd-Scripps	W 91–53	–	– -	– -	– -	Titan Gym; Fullerton, CA
Regular season
November 4, 2025*; 7:00 p.m., ESPN+		Pepperdine	L 70–84	0–1	17 – Steiner	11 – Steiner	3 – Steiner	Titan Gym (336); Fullerton, CA
November 9, 2025*; 2:00 p.m., ESPN+		Cleveland State	L 61–68	0–2	18 – Steiner	6 – Steiner	3 – Steiner	Titan Gym (262); Fullerton, CA
November 12, 2025*; 7:00 p.m., ESPN+		Hope International	W 81–51	1–2	23 – Jones	7 – Jones	2 – Steiner	Titan Gym (235); Fullerton, CA
November 16, 2025*; 12:00 p.m., ESPN+		at Denver	L 55–60	1–3	19 – Jones	8 – Steiner	5 – Pearson	Hamilton Gymnasium (343); Denver, CO
November 21, 2025*; 6:30 p.m., ESPN+		at Sacramento State	L 58–78	1–4	18 – Pearson	13 – Steiner	3 – Pearson	Hornets Nest (767); Sacramento, CA
November 23, 2025*; 2:00 p.m., ESPN+		at Pacific	W 68–56	2–4	22 – Steiner	11 – Steiner	5 – Falsdottir	Alex G. Spanos Center (526); Stockton, CA
November 29, 2025*; 5:00 p.m., ESPN+		Loyola Marymount	L 62–73	2–5	20 – Jones	7 – Jones	3 – Swindle	Titan Gym (231); Fullerton, CA
December 4, 2025; 6:00 p.m., ESPN+		at Cal Poly	W 96–64	3–5 (1–0)	23 – Moon	9 – Steiner	4 – Swindle	Mott Athletics Center (328); San Luis Obispo, CA
December 6, 2025; 1:00 p.m., ESPN+		Hawaii	W 82–80	4–5 (2–0)	22 – Jones	12 – Steiner	5 – Steiner	Titan Gym (163); Fullerton, CA
December 13, 2025*; 2:00 p.m., ESPN+		Portland State	W 81–66	5–5	15 – Swindle	9 – Steiner	3 – Falsdottir	Titan Gym (210); Fullerton, CA
December 20, 2025*; 3:00 p.m., ESPN+		at San Diego	L 55–56	5–6	16 – Jones	7 – Steiner	4 – Pearson	Jenny Craig Pavilion (257); San Diego, CA
December 28, 2025*; 2:00 p.m., ESPN+		La Sierra	W 110–22	6–6	25 – Jones	9 – Petersen	6 – Moon	Titan Gym (233); Fullerton, CA
January 1, 2026; 2:00 p.m., ESPN+		at UC Santa Barbara	W 62–61	7–6 (3–0)	17 – Jones	13 – Steiner	4 – Falsdottir	The Thunderdome (466); Santa Barbara, CA
January 3, 2026; 2:00 p.m., ESPN+		at UC Irvine	L 51–64	7–7 (3–1)	21 – Jones	18 – Jones	3 – Falsdottir	Bren Events Center (659); Irvine, CA
January 8, 2026; 7:00 p.m., ESPN+		UC San Diego	L 69–81 ^{OT}	7–8 (3–2)	21 – Jones	17 – Jones	5 – Falsdottir	Titan Gym (245); Fullerton, CA
January 10, 2026; 2:00 p.m., ESPN+		at Cal State Northridge	W 73–58	8–8 (4–2)	20 – Jones	9 – Jones	5 – Pearson	PACU Arena (335); Northridge, CA
January 15, 2026; 7:00 p.m., ESPN+		UC Davis	L 67–73	8–9 (4–3)	17 – Maxwell	17 – Jones	5 – Pearson	Titan Gym (154); Fullerton, CA
January 17, 2026; 2:00 p.m., ESPN+		UC Riverside	W 83–71	9–9 (5–3)	22 – Jones	12 – Jones	6 – Pearson	Titan Gym (215); Fullerton, CA
January 22, 2026; 6:00 p.m., ESPN+		at Long Beach State	W 84–66	10–9 (6–3)	23 – Pearson	5 – Falsdottir	5 – Tied	Walter Pyramid (618); Long Beach, CA
January 24, 2026; 2:00 p.m., ESPN+		Cal Poly	W 73–41	11–9 (7–3)	17 – Maxwell	9 – Maxwell	6 – Pearson	Titan Gym (115); Fullerton, CA
January 31, 2026; 2:00 p.m., ESPN+		UC Santa Barbara	W 62–60	12–9 (8–3)	19 – Pearson	9 – Jones	5 – Pearson	Titan Gym (189); Fullerton, CA
February 5, 2026; 6:00 p.m., ESPN+		at UC Riverside	W 82–78 ^{OT}	13–9 (9–3)	24 – Jones	19 – Jones	5 – Swindle	SRC Arena (156); Riverside, CA
February 7, 2026; 2:00 p.m., ESPN+		at Cal State Bakersfield	W 92–87 ^{2OT}	14–9 (10–3)	35 – Jones	20 – Jones	4 – Pearson	Icardo Center (113); Bakersfield, CA
February 12, 2026; 7:00 p.m., ESPN+		Long Beach State	W 70–62	15–9 (11–3)	21 – Pearson	11 – Jones	4 – Tied	Titan Gym (432); Fullerton, CA
February 14, 2026; 2:00 p.m., ESPN+		UC Irvine	L 71–77	15–10 (11–4)	15 – Tied	13 – Jones	6 – Pearson	Titan Gym (423); Fullerton, CA
February 19, 2026; 6:00 p.m., ESPN+		at UC Davis	L 64–70	15–11 (11–5)	16 – Tauro	9 – Jones	3 – Falsdottir	University Credit Union Center (584); Davis, CA
February 21, 2026; 2:00 p.m., ESPN+		Cal State Bakersfield	W 60–57	16–11 (12–5)	21 – Jones	21 – Jones	4 – Falsdottir	Titan Gym (162); Fullerton, CA
February 28, 2026; 9:00 p.m., ESPN+		at Hawaii	L 49–67	16–12 (12–6)	10 – Tied	6 – Falsdottir	3 – Falsdottir	Stan Sheriff Center (2,562); Honolulu, HI
March 5, 2026; 6:00 p.m., ESPN+		at UC San Diego	L 69–77	16–13 (12–7)	16 – Maxwell	9 – Tied	6 – Sutisna	LionTree Arena (687); La Jolla, CA
March 7, 2026; 2:00 p.m., ESPN+		Cal State Northridge	W 81–60	17–13 (13–7)	17 – Jones	13 – Jones	6 – Pearson	Titan Gym (179); Fullerton, CA
Big West tournament
March 11, 2026; 12:00 p.m., ESPN+	(5)	vs. (8) Cal State Northridge; First round	W 80–65	18–13	32 – Jones	14 – Jones	5 – Jones	Lee's Family Forum; Henderson, NV
March 12, 2026; 12:00 p.m., ESPN+	(5)	vs. (4) Hawaii; Quarterfinals	L 61–72 ^{OT}	18–14	13 – Maxwell	12 – Jones	2 – Tied	Lee's Family Forum; Henderson, NV
*Non-conference game. ^{#}Rankings from AP poll. (#) Tournament seedings in parentheses. All times are in Pacific.

== See also ==
- 2025–26 Cal State Fullerton Titans men's basketball team
