= 2025–26 Cal State Northridge Matadors women's basketball team =

American college basketball season

2025–26 Cal State Northridge Matadors women's basketball
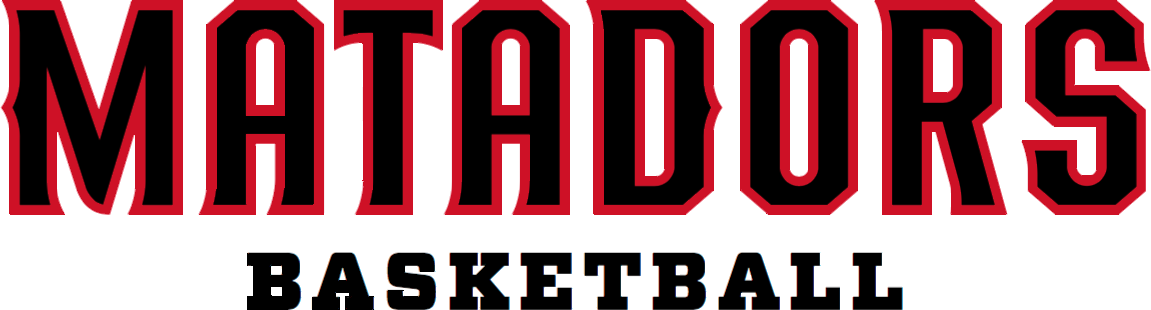
- Conference: Big West Conference
- Record: 10–20 (6–14 Big West)
- Head coach: Angie Ned (2nd season)
- Assistant coaches: Nate Fripp; Akilah Martin; Brittany Dybala
- Home arena: Premier America Credit Union Arena

2025–26 Big West women's basketball standings
	Conf.				Overall
Team	W		L	PCT	W		L	PCT
UC Irvine	17	–	3	.850	26	–	7	.788
UC San Diego †	17	–	3	.850	24	–	9	.727
UC Davis	15	–	5	.750	23	–	11	.676
Hawai'i	14	–	6	.700	22	–	11	.667
Cal State Fullerton	13	–	7	.650	18	–	14	.563
UC Santa Barbara	12	–	8	.600	20	–	10	.667
UC Riverside	8	–	12	.400	11	–	21	.344
Cal State Northridge	6	–	14	.300	10	–	20	.333
Long Beach State	4	–	16	.200	5	–	25	.167
Cal State Bakersfield	2	–	18	.100	7	–	23	.233
Cal Poly	2	–	18	.100	4	–	26	.133
† 2026 Big West tournament winner

The 2025–26 Cal State Northridge Matadors women's basketball team represents California State University, Northridge during the 2025–26 NCAA Division I women's basketball season. The Matadors, led by second-year head coach Angie Ned, play their home games at the Premier America Credit Union Arena in Northridge, California as members of the Big West Conference.

== Previous season ==
The Matadors finished the 2024–25 season 4–25, 2–18 in Big West play, to finish in a tie for tenth (last) place. They failed to qualify for the Big West tournament, as only the top eight teams qualify.

== Preseason ==
On October 16, 2025, the Big West released their preseason poll. Cal State Northridge was picked to finish ninth in the conference.

=== Preseason rankings ===
Big West Preseason Poll
Place	Team	Votes
1	Hawai'i	91 (4)
2	UC Irvine	90 (4)
3	UC Davis	83 (1)
4	UC San Diego	77 (2)
5	UC Santa Barbara	61
6	Long Beach State	57
7	UC Riverside	51
8	Cal Poly	34
9	Cal State Northridge	27
10	Cal State Fullerton	20
11	Cal State Bakersfield	14
(#) first-place votes

=== Preseason All-Big West Team ===
No players were named to the Preseason All-Big West Team.

== Roster ==
2025–26 Cal State Northridge Matadors women's basketball team
Players
Coaches

Pos.	#	Name	Height	Year	Previous school	Hometown
F	0	Jite Gbemuotor	6 ft 2 in (1.88 m)	So	Ole Miss	Delta State, Nigeria
G	1	Amya Moody	5 ft 7 in (1.7 m)	Fr	Martin Luther King High School	Riverside, California
G	2	Saray White	5 ft 11 in (1.8 m)	Jr	Cosumnes River College	Sacramento, California
G	3	Kelly Tumlin	5 ft 9 in (1.75 m)	Sr	Chabot College	San Ramon, California
G	4	Morgan Edwards	5 ft 7 in (1.7 m)	Sr	Cal State Bakersfield	Los Angeles, California
G	5	Norret Lewis	5 ft 10 in (1.78 m)	Fr	McClatchy High School	Sacramento, California
F	10	Alondra Lizama	5 ft 10 in (1.78 m)	Jr	Bishop Alemany High School	North Hollywood, California
G	12	Erika Aspajo	5 ft 5 in (1.65 m)	Sr	Georgian Court	Barcelona, Spain
F	21	Jana Canadell	5 ft 11 in (1.8 m)	Fr	Instituto L'Alzina	Barcelona, Spain
G	22	Laini Dahlin	5 ft 10 in (1.78 m)	Sr	Eastern Arizona College	Central Point, Oregon
F	23	Maya Contreras	6 ft 3 in (1.91 m)	So	New Mexico Junior College	San Elizario, Texas
F	24	Mariona Cos-Morales	6 ft 1 in (1.85 m)	GS	Rider	Matadepera, Spain
G	33	Rita Nazário	5 ft 5 in (1.65 m)	So	Saint Louis	Figueira da Foz, Portugal
F	34	Nadia Bernard	6 ft 4 in (1.93 m)	Jr	Saint Mary's	Santa Clarita, California

Head coach

- Angie Ned (UC Irvine)

Assistant coach(es)

- Nate Fripp (BYU–Hawaii)
- Akilah Martin (UC Riverside)
- Brittany Dybala (Cal Baptist)

Legend

- (C) Team captain
- (S) Suspended
- (I) Ineligible
- (W) Walk-on
- Injured
- Current redshirt

Roster
Last update: December 30, 2025

== Schedule and results ==
Date time, TV	Rank^{#}	Opponent^{#}	Result	Record	High points	High rebounds	High assists	Site (attendance) city, state
Regular season
November 4, 2025*; 6:00 pm, ESPN+		Bethesda	W 103–13	1–0	19 – Dahlin	16 – Gbemuotor	8 – Aspajo	Premier America Credit Union Arena (335); Northridge, CA
November 8, 2025*; 2:00 pm, ESPN+		San Diego	W 63–48	2–0	21 – Nazário	8 – Gbemuotor	5 – Aspajo	Premier America Credit Union Arena (310); Northridge, CA
November 12, 2025*; 6:00 pm, MWN		at San Diego State	L 70–91	2–1	16 – Nazário	6 – Tied	6 – Aspajo	Viejas Arena (1,220); San Diego, CA
November 19, 2025*; 6:00 pm, ESPN+		at California Baptist	L 54–86	2–2	15 – Bernard	7 – Bernard	4 – Edwards	Fowler Events Center (421); Riverside, CA
November 23, 2025*; 1:00 pm, ESPN+		at Idaho	L 56−89	2−3	11 – Nazário	5 – Cos-Morales	3 – Edwards	ICCU Arena (1,006); Moscow, ID
November 26, 2025*; 2:00 pm, ESPN+		Life Pacific	W 106−43	3−3	21 – Edwards	9 – Gbemuotor	5 – Tied	Premier America Credit Union Arena (227); Northridge, CA
December 4, 2025; 6:30 pm, ESPN+		at Cal State Bakersfield	W 59–57	4–3 (1–0)	13 – White	7 – Tied	3 – Nazário	Icardo Center (267); Bakersfield, CA
December 6, 2025; 2:00 pm, ESPN+		UC Irvine	L 46–72	4–4 (1–1)	10 – White	7 – Lizama	4 – Nazário	Premier America Credit Union Arena (359); Northridge, CA
December 13, 2025*; 2:00 pm, ESPN+		San Jose State	W 66–55	5–4	20 – Nazário	8 – Tumlin	3 – Moody	Premier America Credit Union Arena (220); Northridge, CA
December 18, 2025*; 6:00 pm, ESPN+		Northern Arizona	L 56–77	5–5	10 – Tumlin	7 – Contreras	4 – White	Premier America Credit Union Arena (276); Northridge, CA
December 20, 2025*; 1:00 pm, ESPN+		at Pepperdine	L 63–69	5–6	16 – Nazário	11 – Dahlin	4 – White	Firestone Fieldhouse (280); Malibu, CA
January 1, 2026; 6:00 pm, ESPN+		UC Davis	L 66–85	5–7 (1–2)	18 – White	9 – Gbemuotor	3 – Tied	Premier America Credit Union Arena (415); Northridge, CA
January 3, 2026; 2:00 pm, ESPN+		at UC Santa Barbara	L 70–88	5–8 (1–3)	19 – Aspajo	5 – Aspajo	4 – White	The Thunderdome (481); Santa Barbara, CA
January 8, 2026; 6:00 pm, ESPN+		at Cal Poly	W 77–68	6–8 (2–3)	16 – Gbemuotor	15 – Gbemuotor	3 – Tied	Mott Athletics Center (374); San Luis Obispo, CA
January 10, 2026; 2:00 pm, ESPN+		Cal State Fullerton	L 58–73	6–9 (2–4)	26 – White	14 – Gbemuotor	5 – Aspajo	Premier America Credit Union Arena (335); Northridge, CA
January 15, 2026; 6:00 pm, ESPN+		UC San Diego	L 48–60	6–10 (2–5)	14 – Nazário	8 – Tied	4 – White	Premier America Credit Union Arena (385); Northridge, CA
January 17, 2026; 2:00 pm, ESPN+		at Long Beach State	L 61–62	6–11 (2–6)	16 – Tied	8 – Aspajo	6 – Aspajo	LBS Financial Credit Union Pyramid (612); Long Beach, CA
January 24, 2026; 1:00 pm, ESPN+		Hawai'i	L 55–64	6–12 (2–7)	20 – Aspajo	12 – Gbemuotor	5 – Aspajo	Premier America Credit Union Arena (201); Northridge, CA
January 29, 2026; 6:00 pm, ESPN+		at UC Davis	L 51–68	6–13 (2–8)	15 – Tied	8 – Gbemuotor	4 – Aspajo	University Credit Union Center (537); Davis, CA
January 31, 2026; 4:00 pm, ESPN+		at UC San Diego	L 67–82	6–14 (2–9)	20 – Aspajo	6 – Cos-Morales	6 – Aspajo	LionTree Arena (743); La Jolla, CA
February 5, 2026; 6:00 pm, ESPN+		Cal Poly	W 60–50	7–14 (3–9)	15 – Gbemuotor	16 – Gbemuotor	7 – Cos-Morales	Premier America Credit Union Arena (145); Northridge, CA
February 7, 2026; 2:00 pm, ESPN+		at UC Riverside	W 58–53	8–14 (4–9)	16 – Nazário	13 – Gbemuotor	7 – Aspajo	SRC Arena (101); Riverside, CA
February 14, 2026; 8:00 pm, ESPN+		at Hawai'i	L 54–63	8–15 (4–10)	19 – Gbemuotor	10 – Gbemuotor	2 – Tied	Stan Sheriff Center (1,871); Honolulu, HI
February 19, 2026; 6:00 pm, ESPN+		UC Santa Barbara	L 58–74	8–16 (4–11)	11 – Tied	7 – Gbemuotor	5 – Aspajo	Premier America Credit Union Arena (185); Northridge, CA
February 21, 2026; 2:00 pm, ESPN+		Long Beach State	W 85–75	9–16 (5–11)	20 – Nazário	10 – Gbemuotor	4 – Aspajo	Premier America Credit Union Arena (197); Northridge, CA
February 26, 2026; 6:00 pm, ESPN+		at UC Irvine	L 57–60	9–17 (5–12)	23 – White	15 – Gbemuotor	5 – White	Bren Events Center (645); Irvine, CA
February 28, 2026; 2:00 pm, ESPN+		UC Riverside	L 61–70	9–18 (5–13)	19 – Gbemuotor	8 – Gbemuotor	3 – Tied	Premier America Credit Union Arena (303); Northridge, CA
March 5, 2026; 6:00 pm, ESPN+		Cal State Bakersfield	W 82–47	10–18 (6–13)	16 – Nazário	15 – Gbemuotor	3 – White	Premier America Credit Union Arena (376); Northridge, CA
March 7, 2026; 2:00 pm, ESPN+		at Cal State Fullerton	L 60–81	10–19 (6–14)	13 – Tied	6 – Gbemuotor	4 – Aspajo	Titan Gym (179); Fullerton, CA
Big West tournament
March 11, 2026; 12:00 p.m., ESPN+	(8)	vs. (5) Cal State Fullerton; First round	L 65–80	10–20	17 – Nazario	8 – Gbemuotor	4 – Moody	Lee's Family Forum; Henderson, NV
*Non-conference game. ^{#}Rankings from AP Poll. (#) Tournament seedings in parentheses. All times are in Pacific.
