= 2025–26 UC Santa Barbara Gauchos women's basketball team =

American college basketball season

2025–26 UC Santa Barbara Gauchos women's basketball
- Conference: Big West Conference
- Record: 20–10 (12–8 Big West)
- Head coach: Renee Jimenez (2nd season)
- Assistant coaches: Chelsea Carlisle; Dario Frias; Tina Samaniego; Kelsey Forrester
- Home arena: The Thunderdome

2025–26 Big West women's basketball standings
	Conf.				Overall
Team	W		L	PCT	W		L	PCT
UC Irvine	17	–	3	.850	26	–	7	.788
UC San Diego †	17	–	3	.850	24	–	9	.727
UC Davis	15	–	5	.750	23	–	11	.676
Hawai'i	14	–	6	.700	22	–	11	.667
Cal State Fullerton	13	–	7	.650	18	–	14	.563
UC Santa Barbara	12	–	8	.600	20	–	10	.667
UC Riverside	8	–	12	.400	11	–	21	.344
Cal State Northridge	6	–	14	.300	10	–	20	.333
Long Beach State	4	–	16	.200	5	–	25	.167
Cal State Bakersfield	2	–	18	.100	7	–	23	.233
Cal Poly	2	–	18	.100	4	–	26	.133
† 2026 Big West tournament winner

The 2025–26 UC Santa Barbara Gauchos women's basketball team represents the University of California, Santa Barbara during the 2025–26 NCAA Division I women's basketball season. The Gauchos, led by second-year head coach Renee Jimenez, play their home games at The Thunderdome in Santa Barbara, California as members of the Big West Conference.

== Previous season ==
The Gauchos finished the 2024–25 season 18–13, 12–8 in Big West play, to finish in a three-way tie for fifth place. They were defeated by Cal Poly in the first round of the Big West tournament.

== Preseason ==
On October 16, 2025, the Big West released their preseason poll. UC Santa Barbara was picked to finish fifth in the conference.

=== Preseason rankings ===
Big West Preseason Poll
Place	Team	Votes
1	Hawai'i	91 (4)
2	UC Irvine	90 (4)
3	UC Davis	83 (1)
4	UC San Diego	77 (2)
5	UC Santa Barbara	61
6	Long Beach State	57
7	UC Riverside	51
8	Cal Poly	34
9	Cal State Northridge	27
10	Cal State Fullerton	20
11	Cal State Bakersfield	14
(#) first-place votes

=== Preseason All-Big West Team ===
Preseason All-Big West Team
Player	Year	Position
Skylar Burke	Senior	Guard

== Roster ==
2025–26 UC Santa Barbara Gauchos women's basketball team
Players
Coaches

Pos.	#	Name	Height	Year	Previous school	Hometown
F	2	Zoe Borter	6 ft 0 in (1.83 m)	Jr	Beaverton High School	Beaverton, Oregon
F	4	Júlia Puente-Valverde	6 ft 1 in (1.85 m)	RS Jr	McNeese	Barcelona, Spain
F	5	Olivia Bradley	6 ft 1 in (1.85 m)	RS So	Urrbrae Agricultural High School	Adelaide, Australia
G	8	Ava Rawlins	5 ft 10 in (1.78 m)	Fr	Folsom High School	Folsom, California
G	12	Maddie Naro	5 ft 8 in (1.73 m)	Jr	Santa Clara	Beaverton, Oregon
G	15	Chauncey Andersen	6 ft 0 in (1.83 m)	Fr	Jefferson High School	Portland, Oregon
G/F	21	Valentina Penna	6 ft 3 in (1.91 m)	Fr	APU Udine	Bergamo, Italy
G/F	22	Helena Shum-Koubek	5 ft 11 in (1.8 m)	Fr	Oak Park High School	Agoura Hills, California
G	23	Zoe Shaw	5 ft 7 in (1.7 m)	So	St. Bonaventure	Melbourne, Australia
G	31	Martha Pietsch	5 ft 5 in (1.65 m)	Sr	Oregon State	Berlin, Germany
G	32	Jessica Grant	5 ft 8 in (1.73 m)	Sr	Mission Hills High School	San Marcos, California
G	35	Malani Mastora	5 ft 11 in (1.8 m)	So	Alameda High School	Alameda, California
G	44	Bojana Radnjic	5 ft 9 in (1.75 m)	So	Hoosac School	Herceg Novi, Montenegro
G	55	Skylar Burke	5 ft 8 in (1.73 m)	Sr	Coeur d'Alene High School	Coeur d'Alene, Idaho

Head coach

- Renee Jimenez (San Francisco State)

Assistant coach(es)

- Chelsea Carlisle (UC San Diego)
- Dario Frias (Cal State San Bernardino)
- Tina Samaniego (San Francisco)
- Kelsey Forrester (Cal State San Marcos)

Legend

- (C) Team captain
- (S) Suspended
- (I) Ineligible
- (W) Walk-on
- Injured
- Current redshirt

Roster
Last update: December 28, 2025

== Schedule and results ==
Date time, TV	Rank^{#}	Opponent^{#}	Result	Record	High points	High rebounds	High assists	Site (attendance) city, state
Regular season
November 3, 2025*; 6:00 pm, ESPN+		Cal State Monterey Bay	W 80–44	1–0	19 – Bradley	6 – Tied	6 – Naro	The Thunderdome (539); Santa Barbara, CA
November 6, 2025*; 11:30 am, B1G+		at No. 3 UCLA	L 50–87	1–1	11 – Bradley	4 – Tied	3 – Naro	Pauley Pavilion (6,863); Los Angeles, CA
November 9, 2025*; 12:00 pm, ESPN+		at Seattle	W 89–49	2–1	19 – Shaw	7 – Tied	4 – Tied	Redhawk Center (312); Seattle, WA
November 15, 2025*; 2:00 pm, ESPN+		Grand Canyon	W 72–70	3–1	17 – Shaw	7 – Bradley	6 – Borter	The Thunderdome (481); Santa Barbara, CA
November 19, 2025*; 6:00 pm, MWN		at San Jose State	W 75−60	4−1	22 – Borter	6 – Tied	3 – Tied	Provident Credit Union Event Center (567); San Jose, CA
November 22, 2025*; 2:00 pm, ESPN+		Westcliff	Canceled					The Thunderdome; Santa Barbara, CA
November 28, 2025*; 12:00 pm, ESPN+		at California Baptist; CBU Classic	W 74–49	5–1	19 – Borter	9 – Puente-Valverde	8 – Naro	Fowler Events Center (515); Riverside, CA
November 29, 2025*; 2:30 pm, ESPN+		vs. Chattanooga; CBU Classic	W 66–64	6–1	17 – Bradley	7 – Burke	2 – Tied	Fowler Events Center (201); Riverside, CA
December 4, 2025; 6:00 pm, ESPN+		at Long Beach State	W 67–52	7–1 (1–0)	15 – Grant	8 – Bradley	6 – Naro	LBS Financial Credit Union Pyramid (607); Long Beach, CA
December 6, 2025; 2:00 pm, ESPN+		at Cal State Bakersfield	W 67–47	8–1 (2–0)	25 – Borter	7 – Bradley	5 – Naro	Icardo Center (129); Bakersfield, CA
December 13, 2025*; 1:00 pm, ESPN+		at Utah Tech	W 68–65	9–1	16 – Grant	6 – Tied	4 – Tied	Burns Arena (537); St. George, UT
December 18, 2025*; 6:00 pm, ESPN+		Eastern Washington	W 89−63	10−1	24 – Borter	13 – Bradley	5 – Burke	The Thunderdome (527); Santa Barbara, CA
January 1, 2026; 2:00 pm, ESPN+		Cal State Fullerton	L 61–62	10–2 (2–1)	12 – Tied	8 – Burke	6 – Naro	The Thunderdome (466); Santa Barbara, CA
January 3, 2026; 2:00 pm, ESPN+		Cal State Northridge	W 88–70	11–2 (3–1)	18 – Bradley	5 – Andersen	4 – Burke	The Thunderdome (481); Santa Barbara, CA
January 8, 2026; 6:00 pm, ESPN+		at UC Davis	W 55–47	12–2 (4–1)	17 – Borter	9 – Tied	3 – Bradley	University Credit Union Center (582); Davis, CA
January 15, 2026; 6:00 pm, ESPN+		Cal State Bakersfield	W 82–67	13–2 (5–1)	27 – Bradley	12 – Andersen	5 – Borter	The Thunderdome (647); Santa Barbara, CA
January 17, 2026; 9:00 pm, ESPN+		at Hawai'i	L 50–67	13–3 (5–2)	15 – Bradley	6 – Andersen	2 – Naro	Stan Sheriff Center (1,838); Honolulu, HI
January 22, 2026; 7:00 pm, SSN		at Cal Poly; Blue–Green Rivalry	W 61–51	14–3 (6–2)	24 – Borter	6 – Tied	4 – Naro	Mott Athletics Center (459); San Luis Obispo, CA
January 24, 2026; 1:00 pm, SSN		Long Beach State	W 72–56	15–3 (7–2)	20 – Bradley	8 – Tied	4 – Tied	The Thunderdome (628); Santa Barbara, CA
January 29, 2026; 6:00 pm, ESPN+		UC San Diego	L 49–52	15–4 (7–3)	17 – Andersen	13 – Andersen	3 – Tied	The Thunderdome (657); Santa Barbara, CA
January 31, 2026; 2:00 pm, ESPN+		at Cal State Fullerton	L 60–62	15–5 (7–4)	25 – Bradley	13 – Puente-Valverde	4 – Borter	Titan Gym (189); Fullerton, CA
February 5, 2026; 6:00 pm, ESPN+		UC Davis	W 69–61	16–5 (8–4)	29 – Shaw	9 – Andersen	5 – Naro	The Thunderdome (701); Santa Barbara, CA
February 7, 2026; 2:00 pm, ESPN+		at UC Irvine	L 41–63	16–6 (8–5)	9 – Puente-Valverde	10 – Puente-Valverde	3 – Naro	Bren Events Center (722); Irvine, CA
February 12, 2026; 6:00 pm, ESPN+		UC Riverside	L 62–69	16–7 (8–6)	20 – Borter	11 – Andersen	4 – Borter	The Thunderdome (633); Santa Barbara, CA
February 14, 2026; 2:00 pm, ESPN+		Cal Poly; Blue–Green Rivalry	W 63–54	17–7 (9–6)	18 – Borter	6 – Bradley	6 – Naro	The Thunderdome (607); Santa Barbara, CA
February 19, 2026; 6:00 pm, ESPN+		at Cal State Northridge	W 74–58	18–7 (10–6)	20 – Borter	10 – Puente-Valverde	5 – Burke	Premier America Credit Union Arena (185); Northridge, CA
February 21, 2026; 2:00 pm, ESPN+		Hawai'i	L 52–58	18–8 (10–7)	16 – Burke	9 – Naro	3 – Naro	The Thunderdome (585); Santa Barbara, CA
February 26, 2026; 6:00 pm, ESPN+		at UC Riverside	W 61–57	19–8 (11–7)	15 – Burke	12 – Burke	4 – Borter	SRC Arena (266); Riverside, CA
February 28, 2026; 2:00 pm, ESPN+		UC Irvine	W 70–62	20–8 (12–7)	18 – Borter	7 – Bradley	8 – Naro	The Thunderdome (1,289); Santa Barbara, CA
March 7, 2026; 4:00 pm, ESPN+		at UC San Diego	L 65–72	20–9 (12–8)	21 – Borter	8 – Bradley	3 – Naro	LionTree Arena (1,008); La Jolla, CA
Big West tournament
March 11, 2026; 2:30 pm, ESPN+	(6)	vs. (7) UC Riverside; First round	L 53–58	20–10	23 – Bradley	9 – Andersen	5 – Burke	Lee's Family Forum (791); Henderson, NV
*Non-conference game. ^{#}Rankings from AP Poll. (#) Tournament seedings in parentheses. All times are in Pacific.
