= 2026 Big West Conference women's basketball tournament =

American college basketball postseason tournament

- Classification: Division I
- Season: 2025–26
- Teams: 8
- Site: Lee's Family Forum; Henderson, Nevada
- Champions: UC San Diego (2nd title)
- Winning coach: Heidi VanDerveer (2nd title)
- Television: ESPN+

2025–26 Big West women's basketball standings
	Conf.				Overall
Team	W		L	PCT	W		L	PCT
UC Irvine	17	–	3	.850	26	–	7	.788
UC San Diego †	17	–	3	.850	24	–	9	.727
UC Davis	15	–	5	.750	23	–	11	.676
Hawai'i	14	–	6	.700	22	–	11	.667
Cal State Fullerton	13	–	7	.650	18	–	14	.563
UC Santa Barbara	12	–	8	.600	20	–	10	.667
UC Riverside	8	–	12	.400	11	–	21	.344
Cal State Northridge	6	–	14	.300	10	–	20	.333
Long Beach State	4	–	16	.200	5	–	25	.167
Cal State Bakersfield	2	–	18	.100	7	–	23	.233
Cal Poly	2	–	18	.100	4	–	26	.133
† 2026 Big West tournament winner

The 2026 Big West Conference women's basketball tournament was the postseason women's basketball tournament for the Big West Conference of the 2025–26 NCAA Division I women's basketball season. It will was held March 11–14, 2026, at Lee's Family Forum in Henderson, Nevada. The winner, UC San Diego, received the conference's automatic bid to the 2026 NCAA tournament. This was their second Big West championship, winning last year as well.

== Seeds ==
In this format, the top two seeds receive automatic berths in the semifinals, the following two seeds are placed in the quarterfinals, and the remaining four seeds play each other in the first round. Big West commissioner Dan Butterly stated that the decision was made to improve the regular season champions odds of winning the tournament and thus receiving the automatic bid to the NCAA tournament.

Of the 11 conference teams, all 11 were eligible for tournament spots. As has been the case since 2020, reseeding teams do not occur at any point.

Seed	School	Record	Tiebreaker
1	UC Irvine	17–3	2–0 vs. UC Davis
2	UC San Diego	17–3	0–2 vs. UC Davis
3	UC Davis	15–5	
4	Hawai'i	14–6	
5	Cal State Fullerton	13–7	
6	UC Santa Barbara	12–8	
7	UC Riverside	8–12	
8	CSUN	6–14	
DNQ	Long Beach State	4–16	
DNQ	Cal State Bakersfield	2–18	5–5 vs. nonconference opponents
DNQ	Cal Poly	2–18	2–8 vs. nonconference opponents

== Schedule ==
Game	Time	Matchup	Score	Television
First round – Wednesday, March 11
1	12:00 p.m.	No. 5 Cal State Fullerton vs. No. 8 CSUN	80–65	ESPN+
2	2:30 p.m.	No. 6 UC Santa Barbara vs. No. 7 UC Riverside	53–58	ESPN+
Quarterfinals – Thursday, March 12
3	12:00 p.m.	No. 4 Hawai'i vs. No. 5 Cal State Fullerton	72–61^{OT}	ESPN+
4	2:30 p.m.	No. 3 UC Davis vs. No. 7 UC Riverside	70–59	ESPN+
Semifinals – Friday, March 13
5	12:00 p.m.	No. 1 UC Irvine vs. No. 4 Hawai'i	63–67^{OT}	ESPN+
6	2:30 p.m.	No. 2 UC San Diego vs. No. 3 UC Davis	84–79	ESPN+
Final – Saturday, March 14
7	3:00 p.m.	No. 2 UC San Diego vs. No. 4 Hawai'i	60–48	ESPN+
*Game times in PDT. Rankings denote tournament seed.

== Bracket ==
First Round; Wednesday, March 11
5	Cal State Fullerton	80
8	CSUN	65
6	UC Santa Barbara	53
7	UC Riverside	58

Quarterfinals; Thursday, March 12
4	Hawai'i	72*
5	Cal State Fullerton	61
3	UC Davis	70
7	UC Riverside	59

Semifinals; Friday, March 13
1	UC Irvine	63
4	Hawai'i	67*
2	UC San Diego	84
3	UC Davis	79

Championship; Saturday, March 14
4	Hawai'i	48
2	UC San Diego	60

*denotes each overtime period

== See also ==
- 2026 Big West Conference men's basketball tournament
