= 2025–26 Cal State Bakersfield Roadrunners women's basketball team =

American college basketball season

2025–26 Cal State Bakersfield Roadrunners women's basketball
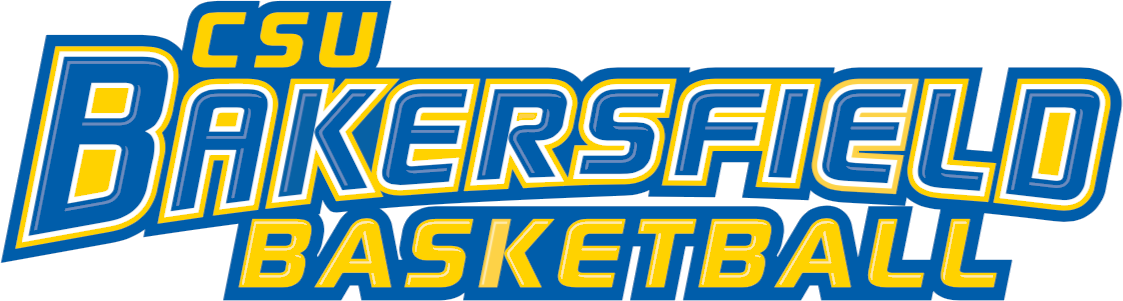
- Conference: Big West Conference
- Record: 7-23 (2-18 Big West)
- Head coach: Ari Wideman (2nd season)
- Associate head coach: Ray Alvarado
- Assistant coaches: Malika Glover; Fa-Ko-Fieme'a (Me'a) Hafoka-Latu; Erika Warren
- Home arena: Icardo Center

2025–26 Big West women's basketball standings
	Conf.				Overall
Team	W		L	PCT	W		L	PCT
UC Irvine	17	–	3	.850	26	–	7	.788
UC San Diego †	17	–	3	.850	24	–	9	.727
UC Davis	15	–	5	.750	23	–	11	.676
Hawai'i	14	–	6	.700	22	–	11	.667
Cal State Fullerton	13	–	7	.650	18	–	14	.563
UC Santa Barbara	12	–	8	.600	20	–	10	.667
UC Riverside	8	–	12	.400	11	–	21	.344
Cal State Northridge	6	–	14	.300	10	–	20	.333
Long Beach State	4	–	16	.200	5	–	25	.167
Cal State Bakersfield	2	–	18	.100	7	–	23	.233
Cal Poly	2	–	18	.100	4	–	26	.133
† 2026 Big West tournament winner

The 2025–26 Cal State Bakersfield Roadrunners women's basketball team represents California State University, Bakersfield during the 2025–26 NCAA Division I women's basketball season. The Roadrunners, led by second-year head coach Ari Wideman, play their home games at the Icardo Center in Bakersfield, California as members of the Big West Conference.

== Previous season ==
The Roadrunners finished the 2024–25 season 2–28, 2–18 in Big West play, to finish in a tie for tenth (last) place. They failed to qualify for the Big West tournament, as only the top eight teams qualify.

== Preseason ==
On October 16, 2025, the Big West released their preseason poll. Cal State Bakersfield was picked to finish 11th (last) in the conference.

=== Preseason rankings ===
Big West Preseason Poll
Place	Team	Votes
1	Hawai'i	91 (4)
2	UC Irvine	90 (4)
3	UC Davis	83 (1)
4	UC San Diego	77 (2)
5	UC Santa Barbara	61
6	Long Beach State	57
7	UC Riverside	51
8	Cal Poly	34
9	Cal State Northridge	27
10	Cal State Fullerton	20
11	Cal State Bakersfield	14
(#) first-place votes

=== Preseason All-Big West Team ===
No players were named to the Preseason All-Big West Team.

== Roster ==
2025–26 Cal State Bakersfield Roadrunners women's basketball team
Players
Coaches

Pos.	#	Name	Height	Year	Previous school	Hometown
F	1	Zalissa Finley	6 ft 1 in (1.85 m)	Jr	Indiana State	Inchelium, Washington
G	2	Aliyah Carter	5 ft 7 in (1.7 m)	So	Huston–Tillotson	Austin, Texas
G	4	Ophelia Powell	5 ft 9 in (1.75 m)	Fr	St Andrew's College	Melbourne, Australia
F	7	Jaime Gallatly	6 ft 0 in (1.83 m)	So	Southern Miss	Maffra, Australia
G/F	8	Marley Langi	6 ft 0 in (1.83 m)	Sr	Skyline College	Redwood City, California
G	11	Maria Dias (5th)	5 ft 8 in (1.73 m)	Sr	Idaho State	Lisbon, Portugal
G	12	Chrishawn Coleman	5 ft 7 in (1.7 m)	So	Morehead State	Arlington, Texas
G	14	Morgan Hawkins	5 ft 7 in (1.7 m)	So	Hawai'i Pacific	Corona, California
G	21	Tianna Sutherland	5 ft 8 in (1.73 m)	Jr	Reedley College	Fresno, California
F	22	Dae'Jaidence Kincade	5 ft 9 in (1.75 m)	Jr	Blinn College	Tyler, Texas
F/C	24	Tena Ikidi (5th)	6 ft 3 in (1.91 m)	Sr	Charlotte	Bayelsa State, Nigeria
G	30	Alli Dioli	5 ft 9 in (1.75 m)	Jr	Mission College	Half Moon Bay, California
F	55	Adrienne Puletasi	6 ft 0 in (1.83 m)	Jr	College of Southern Nevada	Las Vegas, Nevada

Head coach

- Ari Wideman (Nevada)

Assistant coach(es)

- Ray Alvarado (Fresno State)
- Malika Glover (Northern Kentucky)
- Fa-Ko-Fieme'a (Me'a) Hafoka-Latu (San José State)
- Erika Warren (UTEP)

Legend

- (C) Team captain
- (S) Suspended
- (I) Ineligible
- (W) Walk-on
- (5th) Fifth-year senior
- Injured
- Current redshirt

Roster
Last update: January 6, 2026

== Schedule and results ==
Date time, TV	Rank^{#}	Opponent^{#}	Result	Record	High points	High rebounds	High assists	Site (attendance) city, state
Regular season
November 3, 2025*; 6:30 pm, ESPN+		Utah Valley	L 42–66	0–1	9 – Tied	8 – Ikidi	2 – Tied	Icardo Center (134); Bakersfield, CA
November 7, 2025*; 6:30 pm, ESPN+		Fresno State	L 51–74	0–2	26 – Coleman	7 – Ikidi	3 – Hawkins	Icardo Center (233); Bakersfield, CA
November 11, 2025*; 1:30 pm, ESPN+		Utah State	L 65–68	0–3	14 – Dias	9 – Ikidi	4 – Hawkins	Icardo Center (103); Bakersfield, CA
November 15, 2025*; 1:00 pm, MWN		at San Diego State	L 48–78	0–4	25 – Coleman	5 – Tied	2 – Tied	Viejas Arena (2,101); San Diego, CA
November 20, 2025*; 4:30 pm, SLN		at Omaha	W 82−73	1−4	21 – Coleman	15 – Ikidi	3 – Tied	Baxter Arena (508); Omaha, NE
November 22, 2025*; 12:00 pm, ESPN+		at Wichita State	W 60−55	2−4	16 – Coleman	8 – Ikidi	3 – Coleman	Charles Koch Arena (846); Wichita, KS
November 29, 2025*; 5:00 pm, ESPN+		at Arizona	L 63–78	2–5	16 – Dias	6 – Tied	3 – Hawkins	McKale Center (5,328); Tucson, AZ
December 4, 2025; 6:30 pm, ESPN+		Cal State Northridge	L 57–59	2–6 (0–1)	21 – Coleman	8 – Ikidi	2 – Hawkins	Icardo Center (267); Bakersfield, CA
December 6, 2025; 2:00 pm, ESPN+		UC Santa Barbara	L 47–67	2–7 (0–2)	14 – Dias	8 – Coleman	2 – Carter	Icardo Center (129); Bakersfield, CA
December 13, 2025*; 1:00 pm, ESPN+		at Seattle	W 72–51	3–7	21 – Coleman	14 – Ikidi	5 – Carter	Redhawk Center (291); Seattle, WA
December 16, 2025*; 11:00 am, ESPN+		Cal State East Bay	W 67–55	4–7	25 – Coleman	8 – Kincade	3 – Tied	Icardo Center (1,403); Bakersfield, CA
December 20, 2025*; 2:00 pm, ESPN+		Eastern Washington	W 85−72	5−7	19 – Langi	16 – Ikidi	3 – Tied	Icardo Center (81); Bakersfield, CA
January 1, 2026; 2:00 pm, ESPN+		at UC Irvine	L 63–82	5–8 (0–3)	29 – Coleman	11 – Coleman	4 – Carter	Bren Events Center (717); Irvine, CA
January 3, 2026; 3:00 pm, ESPN+		UC Davis	L 59–69	5–9 (0–4)	15 – Tied	9 – Tied	5 – Hawkins	Icardo Center (74); Bakersfield, CA
January 8, 2026; 6:00 pm, ESPN+		at UC Riverside	L 42-64	5-10 (0-5)	11 – Langi	9 – Carter	2 – Tied	SRC Arena (166); Riverside, CA
January 10, 2026; 2:00 pm, ESPN+		Long Beach State	W 75-48	6-10 (1-5)	15 – Coleman	11 – Ikidi	7 – Hawkins	Icardo Center (62); Bakersfield, CA
January 15, 2026; 6:00 pm, ESPN+		at UC Santa Barbara	L 67-82	6-11 (1-6)	27 – Coleman	7 – Carter	3 – Tied	The Thunderdome (647); Santa Barbara, CA
January 17, 2026; 4:00 pm, ESPN+		at UC San Diego	L 66-84	6-12 (1-7)	17 – Langi	8 – Carter	9 – Hawkins	LionTree Arena (425); La Jolla, CA
January 22, 2026; 6:30 pm, ESPN+		Hawai'i	L 52-64	6-13 (1-8)	13 – Dias	12 – Ikidi	3 – Hawkins	Icardo Center (344); Bakersfield, CA
January 29, 2026; 6:00 pm, ESPN+		at Cal Poly	W 62-58	7-13 (2-8)	23 – Coleman	8 – Carter	3 – Carter	Mott Athletics Center (312); San Luis Obispo, CA
January 31, 2026; 2:00 pm, ESPN+		at UC Davis	L 68-76	7-14 (2-9)	29 – Langi	5 – Finley	5 – Carter	University Credit Union Center (733); Davis, CA
February 5, 2026; 6:30 pm, ESPN+		UC Irvine	L 53-85	7-15 (2-10)	22 – Langi	6 – Kincade	3 – Carter	Icardo Center (112); Bakersfield, CA
February 7, 2026; 2:00 pm, ESPN+		Cal State Fullerton	L 87-92 ^{2 OT}	7-16 (2-11)	22 – Coleman	9 – Tied	3 – Coleman	Icardo Center (113); Bakersfield, CA
February 12, 2026; 9:00 pm, ESPN+		at Hawai'i	L 54-61	7-17 (2-12)	16 – Tied	8 – Carter	3 – Coleman	Stan Sheriff Center (1,761); Honolulu, HI
February 19, 2026; 6:30 pm, ESPN+		UC Riverside	L 58-62	7-18 (2-13)	15 – Coleman	22 – Ikidi	3 – Sutherland	Icardo Center (163); Bakersfield, CA
February 21, 2026; 2:00 pm, ESPN+		at Cal State Fullerton	L 57-60	7-19 (2-14)	20 – Coleman	13 – Ikidi	3 – Hawkins	Titan Gym (162); Fullerton, CA
February 26, 2026; 6:30 pm, ESPN+		UC San Diego	L 79-85	7-20 (2-15)	21 – Langi	8 – Ikidi	7 – Hawkins	Icardo Center (138); Bakersfield, CA
February 28, 2026; 2:00 pm, ESPN+		at Long Beach State	L 62-72 ^{OT}	7-21 (2-16)	19 – Sutherland	12 – Ikidi	5 – Hawkins	LBS Financial Credit Union Pyramid (1,043); Long Beach, CA
March 5, 2026; 6:00 pm, ESPN+		at Cal State Northridge	L 47-82	7-22 (2-17)	12 – Hawkins	8 – Ikidi	2 – Tied	Premier America Credit Union Arena (376); Northridge, CA
March 7, 2026; 2:00 pm, ESPN+		Cal Poly	L 54-66	7-23 (2-18)	17 – Langi	8 – Ikidi	3 – Hawkins	Icardo Center (174); Bakersfield, CA
*Non-conference game. ^{#}Rankings from AP Poll. (#) Tournament seedings in parentheses. All times are in Pacific.
