= 2025–26 Cal Poly Mustangs women's basketball team =

American college basketball season

2025–26 Cal Poly Mustangs women's basketball
- Conference: Big West Conference
- Record: 4-26 (2-18 Big West)
- Head coach: Shanele Stires (4th season)
- Associate head coach: Samba Johnson
- Assistant coaches: Njeri Nelms; Grace Campbell
- Home arena: Mott Athletics Center

2025–26 Big West women's basketball standings
	Conf.				Overall
Team	W		L	PCT	W		L	PCT
UC Irvine	17	–	3	.850	26	–	5	.839
UC San Diego	17	–	3	.850	22	–	8	.733
UC Davis	15	–	5	.750	23	–	9	.719
Hawai'i	14	–	6	.700	21	–	10	.677
Cal State Fullerton	13	–	7	.650	18	–	14	.563
UC Santa Barbara	12	–	8	.600	20	–	10	.667
UC Riverside	8	–	12	.400	11	–	21	.344
Cal State Northridge	6	–	14	.300	10	–	20	.333
Long Beach State	4	–	16	.200	5	–	25	.167
Cal State Bakersfield	2	–	18	.100	7	–	23	.233
Cal Poly	2	–	18	.100	4	–	26	.133
† 2026 Big West tournament winner As of March 12, 2026

The 2025–26 Cal Poly Mustangs women's basketball team represents California Polytechnic State University, San Luis Obispo during the 2025–26 NCAA Division I women's basketball season. The Mustangs, led by fourth-year head coach Shanele Stires, play their home games at the Robert A. Mott Athletics Center in San Luis Obispo, California as a member of the Big West Conference.

== Previous season ==
The Mustangs finished the 2024–25 season 14–18, 8–12 in Big West play, to finish in eighth place. They upset UC Santa Barbara, before falling to eventual tournament champions UC San Diego in the quarterfinals of the Big West tournament.

== Preseason ==
On October 16, 2025, the Big West released their preseason poll. Cal Poly was picked to finish eighth in the conference.

=== Preseason rankings ===
Big West Preseason Poll
Place	Team	Votes
1	Hawai'i	91 (4)
2	UC Irvine	90 (4)
3	UC Davis	83 (1)
4	UC San Diego	77 (2)
5	UC Santa Barbara	61
6	Long Beach State	57
7	UC Riverside	51
8	Cal Poly	34
9	Cal State Northridge	27
10	Cal State Fullerton	20
11	Cal State Bakersfield	14
(#) first-place votes

=== Preseason All-Big West Team ===
No players were named to the Preseason All-Big West Team.

== Roster ==
2025–26 Cal Poly Mustangs women's basketball team
Players
Coaches

Pos.	#	Name	Height	Year	Previous school	Hometown
G	0	Vanessa McManus	5 ft 7 in (1.7 m)	So	Saint Leo	Staten Island, New York
G	1	Arissa Garcia	5 ft 6 in (1.68 m)	Jr	Murray State College	San Antonio, Texas
G	3	Ella Skrzyniarz	5 ft 8 in (1.73 m)	Fr	Vista del Lago High School	Folsom, California
G	5	Gabby Robinson	5 ft 10 in (1.78 m)	So	Centennial High School	Yorba Linda, California
G	7	Jordan Billing	5 ft 10 in (1.78 m)	RS So	Emmanuel College	Gold Coast, Australia
G	8	Katie Peiffer	5 ft 10 in (1.78 m)	Fr	Round Rock High School	Austin, Texas
F	9	Nora Perez	6 ft 0 in (1.83 m)	So	San Ignacio de Loyola	Donostia San Sebastián, Spain
F	11	Avery Knapp	6 ft 1 in (1.85 m)	So	San Ramon Valley High School	Danville, California
F	14	Gillian Bears	6 ft 3 in (1.91 m)	So	Gonzaga Prep	Spokane, Washington
F	21	Dulci Vail	6 ft 0 in (1.83 m)	Fr	Acalanes High School	Lafayette, California
G	22	Alana Goosby	5 ft 7 in (1.7 m)	RS So	Allen High School	Allen, Texas
G	23	Ana Moleón Hidalgo	5 ft 11 in (1.8 m)	So	San Gabriel High School	Elche-Alicante, Spain
G	24	Madison Butcher	5 ft 10 in (1.78 m)	RS Jr	Sacramento State	Loomis, California
F	25	Maya Sharvit	6 ft 0 in (1.83 m)	Fr	Begin High School	Rosh-Haayin, Israel
F	32	Charish Thompson	6 ft 0 in (1.83 m)	Fr	Sachse High School	Sachse, Texas
G	55	Vivian Franklin	5 ft 7 in (1.7 m)	Fr	Greenhill School	Dallas, Texas

Head coach

- Shanele Stires (Kansas State)

Assistant coach(es)

- Samba Johnson (Chaminade)
- Njeri Nelms (Charleston Southern)
- Grace Campbell (Cal State East Bay)

Legend

- (C) Team captain
- (S) Suspended
- (I) Ineligible
- (W) Walk-on
- Injured
- Current redshirt

Roster
Last update: January 4, 2026

== Schedule and results ==
Date time, TV	Rank^{#}	Opponent^{#}	Result	Record	High points	High rebounds	High assists	Site (attendance) city, state
Exhibition
October 30, 2025*; 11:00 am		Simpson	W 107–42	–	25 – Bears	8 – Tied	5 – Butcher	Mott Athletics Center (2,758); San Luis Obispo, CA
Regular season
November 3, 2025*; 6:00 pm, ESPN+		UC Santa Cruz	W 87–27	1–0	24 – McManus	8 – Tied	4 – Perez	Mott Athletics Center (358); San Luis Obispo, CA
November 9, 2025*; 1:00 pm, ACCNX		at Stanford	L 55–90	1–1	29 – McManus	6 – Goosby	1 – Tied	Maples Pavilion (2,461); Stanford, CA
November 15, 2025*; 1:00 pm, ESPN+		at Seattle	L 73–75	1–2	29 – Thompson	10 – McManus	7 – Goosby	Redhawk Center (305); Seattle, WA
November 17, 2025*; 5:00 pm, ESPN+		at Eastern Washington	L 67−78	1−3	22 – McManus	5 – Tied	4 – Goosby	Reese Court (620); Cheney, WA
November 21, 2025*; 6:00 pm, ESPN+		Southern Utah	L 80−85 ^{OT}	1−4	34 – McManus	8 – Thompson	4 – McManus	Mott Athletics Center (441); San Luis Obispo, CA
November 24, 2025*; 6:00 pm, ESPN+		Chapman	W 59–31	2–4	14 – McManus	9 – Tied	4 – Franklin	Mott Athletics Center; San Luis Obispo, CA
December 4, 2025; 6:00 pm, ESPN+		Cal State Fullerton	L 64–96	2–5 (0–1)	19 – McManus	6 – Thompson	7 – Goosby	Mott Athletics Center (328); San Luis Obispo, CA
December 6, 2025; 4:00 pm, ESPN+		at UC Riverside	L 46–63	2–6 (0–2)	11 – Thompson	10 – Thompson	3 – McManus	SRC Arena (101); Riverside, CA
December 13, 2025*; 2:00 pm, ESPN+		Idaho State	L 49–62	2–7	19 – Thompson	10 – Perez	3 – Goosby	Mott Athletics Center (453); San Luis Obispo, CA
December 16, 2025*; 7:00 pm, BTN		at No. 4 UCLA	L 28–115	2–8	8 – Tied	3 – Tied	2 – Tied	Pauley Pavilion (3,110); Los Angeles, CA
December 18, 2025*; 7:00 pm, B1G+		at No. 19 USC	L 39−86	2−9	11 – Butcher	7 – Butcher	7 – Goosby	Galen Center (3,511); Los Angeles, CA
December 28, 2025*; 2:00 pm, ACCNX		at California	L 50–91	2–10	15 – McManus	6 – Robinson	4 – Robinson	Haas Pavilion (1,596); Berkeley, CA
January 1, 2026; 12:00 pm, ESPN+		at UC San Diego	L 54–75	2–11 (0–3)	17 – McManus	6 – Tied	3 – Thompson	LionTree Arena (410); La Jolla, CA
January 3, 2026; 2:00 pm, ESPN+		at Long Beach State	W 63–49	3–11 (1–3)	20 – Thompson	8 – Robinson	3 – Goosby	LBS Financial Credit Union Pyramid (496); Long Beach, CA
January 8, 2026; 6:00 pm, ESPN+		Cal State Northridge	L 68-77	3-12 (1-4)	31 – McManus	9 – Robinson	4 – Goosby	Mott Athletics Center (374); San Luis Obispo, CA
January 10, 2026; 2:00 pm, ESPN+		at UC Davis	L 61-87	3-13 (1-5)	18 – Thompson	8 – Perez	4 – Perez	University Credit Union Center (706); Davis, CA
January 15, 2026; 9:00 pm, ESPN+		at Hawai'i	L 46-86	3-14 (1-6)	22 – McManus	5 – Tied	1 – Tied	Stan Sheriff Center (1,562); Honolulu, HI
January 22, 2026; 7:00 pm, SSN/ESPN+		UC Santa Barbara; Blue–Green Rivalry	L 51-61	3-15 (1-7)	15 – Peiffer	9 – Thompson	3 – Thompson	Mott Athletics Center (459); San Luis Obispo, CA
January 24, 2026; 2:00 pm, ESPN+		at Cal State Fullerton	L 41-73	3-16 (1-8)	12 – Thompson	6 – Tied	3 – Goosby	Titan Gym (115); Fullerton, CA
January 29, 2026; 6:00 pm, ESPN+		Cal State Bakersfield	L 58-62	3-17 (1-9)	18 – McManus	8 – McManus	3 – Tied	Mott Athletics Center (312); San Luis Obispo, CA
January 31, 2026; 2:00 pm, ESPN+		UC Riverside	L 66-70	3-18 (1-10)	20 – Thompson	9 – Thompson	3 – Tied	Mott Athletics Center (406); San Luis Obispo, CA
February 5, 2026; 6:00 pm, ESPN+		at Cal State Northridge	L 50-65	3-19 (1-11)	18 – Thompson	7 – Thompson	4 – Goosby	Premier America Credit Union Arena (145); Northridge, CA
February 7, 2026; 2:00 pm, ESPN+		UC Davis	L 55-59	3-20 (1-12)	20 – Thompson	8 – Thompson	4 – Goosby	Mott Athletics Center (528); San Luis Obispo, CA
February 12, 2026; 6:00 pm, ESPN+		at UC Irvine	L 39-84	3-21 (1-13)	15 – Thompson	4 – Tied	2 – Perez	Bren Events Center (580); Irvine, CA
February 14, 2026; 2:00 pm, ESPN+		at UC Santa Barbara; Blue–Green Rivalry	L 54-63	3-22 (1-14)	11 – Thompson	7 – Perez	5 – Goosby	The Thunderdome (607); Santa Barbara, CA
February 19, 2026; 6:00 pm, ESPN+		Hawai'i	L 54-71	3-23 (1-15)	22 – Thompson	9 – Knapp	3 – Tied	Mott Athletics Center (409); San Luis Obispo, CA
February 26, 2026; 6:00 pm, ESPN+		at Long Beach State	L 57-67	3-24 (1-16)	15 – Tied	6 – Tied	6 – Goosby	LBS Financial Credit Union Pyramid (532); Long Beach, CA
February 28, 2026; 2:00 pm, ESPN+		UC San Diego	L 61-85	3-25 (1-17)	14 – Vail	7 – Goosby	6 – Goosby	Mott Athletics Center (424); San Luis Obispo, CA
March 5, 2026; 6:00 pm, ESPN+		UC Irvine	L 65-85	3-26 (1-18)	15 – Thompson	6 – Thompson	7 – Goosby	Mott Athletics Center (409); San Luis Obispo, CA
March 7, 2026; 2:00 pm, ESPN+		at Cal State Bakersfield	W 66-54	4-26 (2-18)	19 – Thompson	7 – Thompson	4 – Goosby	Icardo Center (174); Bakersfield, CA
*Non-conference game. ^{#}Rankings from AP Poll. (#) Tournament seedings in parentheses. All times are in Pacific.
