= 2025–26 Hawaii Rainbow Wahine basketball team =

American college basketball season

2025–26 Hawaii Rainbow Wahine basketball
- Conference: Big West Conference
- Record: 22–11 (14–6 Big West)
- Head coach: Laura Beeman (14th season)
- Associate head coach: Alex Delanian
- Assistant coaches: Derrick Florence; Khalilah Mitchell; Jason Hill
- Home arena: Stan Sheriff Center

2025–26 Big West women's basketball standings
	Conf.				Overall
Team	W		L	PCT	W		L	PCT
UC Irvine	17	–	3	.850	26	–	7	.788
UC San Diego †	17	–	3	.850	24	–	9	.727
UC Davis	15	–	5	.750	23	–	11	.676
Hawai'i	14	–	6	.700	22	–	11	.667
Cal State Fullerton	13	–	7	.650	18	–	14	.563
UC Santa Barbara	12	–	8	.600	20	–	10	.667
UC Riverside	8	–	12	.400	11	–	21	.344
Cal State Northridge	6	–	14	.300	10	–	20	.333
Long Beach State	4	–	16	.200	5	–	25	.167
Cal State Bakersfield	2	–	18	.100	7	–	23	.233
Cal Poly	2	–	18	.100	4	–	26	.133
† 2026 Big West tournament winner

The 2025–26 Hawaii Rainbow Wahine basketball team represented the University of Hawaiʻi at Mānoa during the 2025–26 NCAA Division I women's basketball season. The Rainbow Wahine, led by 14th-year head coach Laura Beeman, played their home games at the Stan Sheriff Center in Honolulu, Hawaii, as members of the Big West Conference.

At the conclusion of the season, Beeman retired from coaching.

== Previous season ==
The Rainbow Wahine finished the 2024–25 season 22–10, 16–4 in Big West play, to finish as Big West regular season champions. They were upset by eventual tournament champions UC San Diego in the semifinals of the Big West tournament. They received an automatic bid to the WBIT, where they would be defeated by UNLV in the first round.

== Preseason ==
On October 16, 2025, the Big West released their preseason poll. Hawai'i was picked to finish atop in the conference, with four first-place votes.

=== Preseason rankings ===
Big West Preseason Poll
Place	Team	Votes
1	Hawai'i	91 (4)
2	UC Irvine	90 (4)
3	UC Davis	83 (1)
4	UC San Diego	77 (2)
5	UC Santa Barbara	61
6	Long Beach State	57
7	UC Riverside	51
8	Cal Poly	34
9	Cal State Northridge	27
10	Cal State Fullerton	20
11	Cal State Bakersfield	14
(#) first-place votes

=== Preseason All-Big West Team ===
Preseason All-Big West Team
Player	Year	Position
Imani Perez	Senior	Forward
Ritorya Tamilo	Sophomore	Center

== Roster ==
2025–26 Hawaii Rainbow Wahine women's basketball team
Players
Coaches

Pos.	#	Name	Height	Year	Previous school	Hometown
G	1	Kira-May Filemu	5 ft 11 in (1.8 m)	So	Westfields Sports High School	Wattle Grove, Australia
G	2	Teyahna Bond	5 ft 8 in (1.73 m)	Fr	St Monica's College	Cairns, Australia
G	3	Bailey Flavell	5 ft 10 in (1.78 m)	Fr	Takapuna Grammar School	Auckland, New Zealand
G	4	Jovi Lefotu	5 ft 8 in (1.73 m)	RS Jr	ʻIolani School	Kāneʻohe, Hawaii
G	6	Kyra Webb	6 ft 1 in (1.85 m)	Fr	Padua College	Melbourne, Australia
G	7	Ella Collins	5 ft 8 in (1.73 m)	Fr	St Clare's College	Canberra, Australia
F	8	Rebecca Moors	6 ft 2 in (1.88 m)	So	Westlake Girls High School	Auckland, New Zealand
F	10	Danijela Kujovic	6 ft 1 in (1.85 m)	RS Fr	Our Lady of Mercy College	Bulleen, Australia
G	11	Keiara Curtis	5 ft 8 in (1.73 m)	Fr	Bellarmine Prep	Seattle, Washington
F	12	Imani Perez	6 ft 4 in (1.93 m)	Sr	Mullen High School	Denver, Colorado
F	17	Fiamma Serra	6 ft 4 in (1.93 m)	Fr	IIS G. Bertacchi	La Spezia, Italy
G	20	Izzy Forsyth	6 ft 0 in (1.83 m)	Sr	UC San Diego	Vancouver, British Columbia
G	22	Jade Peacock	6 ft 0 in (1.83 m)	Jr	Hillcrest Christian College	Gold Coast, Australia
C	24	Ritorya Tamilo	6 ft 5 in (1.96 m)	So	Baradene College	Auckland, New Zealand
F	33	Saniyah Neverson	6 ft 0 in (1.83 m)	Sr	Northern Arizona	Surprise, Arizona

Head coach

- Laura Beeman (Cal State San Bernardino)

Assistant coach(es)

- Alex Delanian (USC)
- Derrick Florence (Morehouse)
- Khalilah Mitchell (LSU)
- Jason Hill (USC)

Legend

- (C) Team captain
- (S) Suspended
- (I) Ineligible
- (W) Walk-on
- Injured
- Current redshirt

Roster
Last update: January 1, 2026

== Schedule and results ==
Date time, TV	Rank^{#}	Opponent^{#}	Result	Record	High points	High rebounds	High assists	Site (attendance) city, state
Exhibition
October 21, 2025*; 7:00 pm		Chaminade	W 90–33	–	16 – Filemu	7 – Tied	6 – Bond	Stan Sheriff Center (550); Honolulu, HI
October 28, 2025*; 7:00 pm		Hawai'i Pacific	W 74–34	–	14 – Perez	7 – Perez	4 – Bond	Stan Sheriff Center (489); Honolulu, HI
Regular season
November 4, 2025*; 7:00 pm, SPECTS/ESPN+		Portland State	W 74–63	1–0	14 – Flavell	7 – Webb	5 – Bond	Stan Sheriff Center (2,001); Honolulu, HI
November 13, 2025*; 7:00 pm, SPECTS/ESPN+		Saint Martin's	W 46–41 ^{OT}	2–0	15 – Flavell	10 – Webb	3 – Webb	Stan Sheriff Center (1,707); Honolulu, HI
November 21, 2025*; 11:00 am, ESPN+		Loyola Marymount; Bank of Hawai‘i Classic	W 55–51	3–0	10 – Neverson	5 – Neverson	4 – Bond	Stan Sheriff Center (2,784); Honolulu, HI
November 23, 2025*; 2:30 pm, ESPN+		Portland; Bank of Hawai‘i Classic	W 66−61	4−0	16 – Tamilo	5 – Tied	4 – Bond	Stan Sheriff Center (1,957); Honolulu, HI
November 28, 2025*; 2:30 pm, ESPN+		Vermont; Rainbow Wahine Showdown	L 67−73	4−1	16 – Curtis	10 – Perez	4 – Flavell	Stan Sheriff Center (1,680); Honolulu, HI
November 29, 2025*; 2:30 pm, ESPN+		Lindenwood; Rainbow Wahine Showdown	L 59–68	4–2	20 – Flavell	7 – Tamilo	4 – Bond	Stan Sheriff Center (1,571); Honolulu, HI
November 30, 2025*; 2:30 pm, ESPN+		Santa Clara; Rainbow Wahine Showdown	L 57–76	4–3	10 – Flavell	8 – Perez	3 – Peacock	Stan Sheriff Center (1,594); Honolulu, HI
December 4, 2025; 4:00 pm, ESPN+		at UC Davis	L 63–68	4–4 (0–1)	22 – Flavell	7 – Tied	4 – Bond	University Credit Union Center (569); Davis, CA
December 6, 2025; 11:00 am, ESPN+		at Cal State Fullerton	L 80–82	4–5 (0–2)	17 – Flavell	13 – Perez	9 – Bond	Titan Gym (163); Fullerton, CA
December 11, 2025*; 7:00 pm, SPECTS/ESPN+		Hawai'i–Hilo	W 61–47	5–5	9 – Tied	10 – Perez	3 – Flavell	Stan Sheriff Center (1,505); Honolulu, HI
December 19, 2025*; 7:30 pm, YouTube		vs. Liberty; Maui Classic	W 67–58	6–5	14 – Perez	6 – Tamilo	3 – Tied	Seabury Hall (1,357); Makawao, HI
December 20, 2025*; 3:30 pm, YouTube		vs. Montana State; Maui Classic	L 56–72	6–6	14 – Curtis	7 – Tamilo	2 – Tied	Seabury Hall; Makawao, HI
January 1, 2026; 7:00 pm, SPECTS/ESPN+		UC Riverside	L 58–65	6–7 (0–3)	17 – Curtis	12 – Perez	3 – Tied	Stan Sheriff Center (1,688); Honolulu, HI
January 3, 2026; 7:00 pm, SPECTS/ESPN+		UC San Diego	L 54–65	6–8 (0–4)	13 – Curtis	7 – Flavell	2 – Perez	Stan Sheriff Center (1,731); Honolulu, HI
January 10, 2026; 12:00 pm, ESPN+		at UC Irvine	L 47-50	6-9 (0-5)	13 – Flavell	7 – Perez	6 – Flavell	Bren Events Center (713); Irvine, CA
January 15, 2026; 7:00 pm, SPECTS/ESPN+		Cal Poly	W 86-46	7-9 (1-5)	22 – Flavell	6 – Flavell	4 – Flavell	Stan Sheriff Center (1,562); Honolulu, HI
January 17, 2026; 7:00 pm, SPECTS/ESPN+		UC Santa Barbara	W 67-50	8-9 (2-5)	19 – Curtis	8 – Curtis	4 – Curtis	Stan Sheriff Center (1,838); Honolulu, HI
January 22, 2026; 4:30 pm, ESPN+		at Cal State Bakersfield	W 64-52	9-9 (3-5)	22 – Flavell	10 – Flavell	4 – Curtis	Icardo Center (344); Bakersfield, CA
January 24, 2026; 11:00 am, ESPN+		at Cal State Northridge	W 64-55	10-9 (4-5)	17 – Flavell	8 – Perez	3 – Curtis	Premier America Credit Union Arena (201); Northridge, CA
January 29, 2026; 7:00 pm, SPECTS/ESPN+		UC Irvine	W 55-50	11-9 (5-5)	18 – Flavell	9 – Perez	3 – Tamilo	Stan Sheriff Center (1,820); Honolulu, HI
January 31, 2026; 7:00 pm, SPECTS/ESPN+		Long Beach State	W 67-44	12-9 (6-5)	15 – Perez	10 – Tamilo	3 – Curtis	Stan Sheriff Center (4,761); Honolulu, HI
February 7, 2026; 2:00 pm, ESPN+		at UC San Diego	L 46-59	12-10 (6-6)	18 – Flavell	8 – Perez	3 – Neverson	LionTree Arena (1,082); La Jolla, CA
February 12, 2026; 7:00 pm, SPECTS/ESPN+		Cal State Bakersfield	W 61-54	13-10 (7-6)	13 – Tamilo	6 – Perez	2 – Perez	Stan Sheriff Center (1,761); Honolulu, HI
February 14, 2026; 6:00 pm, SPECTS/ESPN+		Cal State Northridge	W 63-54	14-10 (8-6)	18 – Perez	12 – Neverson	4 – Curtis	Stan Sheriff Center (1,871); Honolulu, HI
February 19, 2026; 4:00 pm, ESPN+		at Cal Poly	W 71-54	15-10 (9-6)	15 – Flavell	7 – Flavell	4 – Flavell	Mott Athletics Center (409); San Luis Obispo, CA
February 21, 2026; 12:00 pm, ESPN+		at UC Santa Barbara	W 58-52	16-10 (10-6)	14 – Perez	12 – Neverson	4 – Curtis	The Thunderdome (585); Santa Barbara, CA
February 26, 2026; 7:00 pm, SPECTS/ESPN+		UC Davis	W 67-46	17-10 (11-6)	16 – Flavell	8 – Flavell	3 – Curtis	Stan Sheriff Center (1,771); Honolulu, HI
February 28, 2026; 7:00 pm, SPECTS/ESPN+		Cal State Fullerton	W 67-49	18-10 (12-6)	12 – Neverson	7 – Flavell	4 – Flavell	Stan Sheriff Center (2,562); Honolulu, HI
March 5, 2026; 4:00 pm, ESPN+		at UC Riverside	W 89-56	19-10 (13-6)	19 – Neverson	5 – Curtis	6 – Curtis	SRC Arena (277); Riverside, CA
March 7, 2026; 12:00 pm, ESPN+		at Long Beach State	W 74-39	20-10 (14-6)	16 – Curtis	8 – Perez	4 – Bond	LBS Financial Credit Union Pyramid (991); Long Beach, CA
Big West tournament
March 12, 2026; 9:00 am, ESPN+	(4)	vs. (5) Cal State Fullerton; Quarterfinals	W 72-61 ^{OT}	21-10	14 – Flavell	10 – Tamilo	5 – Curtis	Lee's Family Forum; Henderson, NV
March 13, 2026; 9:00 am, ESPN+	(4)	vs. (1) UC Irvine; Semifinals	W 67-63	22-10	13 – Flavell	7 – Neverson	5 – Bond	Lee's Family Forum; Henderson, NV
March 14, 2026; 12:00 pm, ESPN+	(4)	vs. (2) UC San Diego; Finals	L 48-60	22-11	13 – Flavell	6 – Neverson	3 – Bond	Lee's Family Forum; Henderson, NV
*Non-conference game. ^{#}Rankings from AP Poll. (#) Tournament seedings in parentheses. All times are in Hawaii–Aleutian.
