= 2025–26 UC Riverside Highlanders women's basketball team =

American college basketball season

2025–26 UC Riverside Highlanders women's basketball
- Conference: Big West Conference
- Record: 11–21 (8–12 Big West)
- Head coach: Brad Langston (3rd season)
- Associate head coach: Natasha Smith
- Assistant coaches: Jewelyn Huth; Najé Murray; Lorenzo Griffin
- Home arena: SRC Arena

2025–26 Big West women's basketball standings
	Conf.				Overall
Team	W		L	PCT	W		L	PCT
UC Irvine	17	–	3	.850	26	–	7	.788
UC San Diego †	17	–	3	.850	24	–	9	.727
UC Davis	15	–	5	.750	23	–	11	.676
Hawai'i	14	–	6	.700	22	–	11	.667
Cal State Fullerton	13	–	7	.650	18	–	14	.563
UC Santa Barbara	12	–	8	.600	20	–	10	.667
UC Riverside	8	–	12	.400	11	–	21	.344
Cal State Northridge	6	–	14	.300	10	–	20	.333
Long Beach State	4	–	16	.200	5	–	25	.167
Cal State Bakersfield	2	–	18	.100	7	–	23	.233
Cal Poly	2	–	18	.100	4	–	26	.133
† 2026 Big West tournament winner

The 2025–26 UC Riverside Highlanders women's basketball team represents the University of California, Riverside during the 2025–26 NCAA Division I women's basketball season. The Highlanders, led by third-year head coach Brad Langston, play their home games at the SRC Arena in Riverside, California as members of the Big West Conference.

== Previous season ==
The Highlanders finished the 2024–25 season 17–15, 12–8 in Big West play, to finish in a three-way tie for fifth place. They defeated Long Beach State, before falling to UC Davis in the quarterfinals of the Big West tournament.

== Preseason ==
On October 16, 2025, the Big West released their preseason poll. UC Riverside was picked to finish seventh in the conference.

=== Preseason rankings ===
Big West Preseason Poll
Place	Team	Votes
1	Hawai'i	91 (4)
2	UC Irvine	90 (4)
3	UC Davis	83 (1)
4	UC San Diego	77 (2)
5	UC Santa Barbara	61
6	Long Beach State	57
7	UC Riverside	51
8	Cal Poly	34
9	Cal State Northridge	27
10	Cal State Fullerton	20
11	Cal State Bakersfield	14
(#) first-place votes

=== Preseason All-Big West Team ===
Preseason All-Big West Team
Player	Year	Position
Shelley Duchemin	Senior	Guard

== Roster ==
2025–26 UC Riverside Highlanders women's basketball team
Players
Coaches

Pos.	#	Name	Height	Year	Previous school	Hometown
G	1	Kaylani Polk	5 ft 8 in (1.73 m)	So	Paramount High School	Compton, California
G	2	Seneca Hackley	5 ft 8 in (1.73 m)	GS	Northern Colorado	Colorado Springs, Colorado
G	3	Zoe Tillery	5 ft 8 in (1.73 m)	Sr	Laguna Creek High School	Sacramento, California
G	5	Shelley Duchemin	6 ft 0 in (1.83 m)	Sr	Northern Colorado	Culver City, California
G	7	Hannah Wickstrom	5 ft 10 in (1.78 m)	So	Kilbreda College	Melbourne, Australia
G	8	Aaliyah Stanton	5 ft 3 in (1.6 m)	Jr	Cal State Fullerton	San Diego, California
G/F	9	Maya Chocano	6 ft 1 in (1.85 m)	Jr	King's Christian Collegiate	Toronto, Ontario
G	10	Makayla Minshall	5 ft 9 in (1.75 m)	So	Westfields Sports High School	Sydney, Australia
F	11	Jayda Cobbs	5 ft 8 in (1.73 m)	Fr	Ontario High School	Ontario, California
G	22	Taylor Swanson	5 ft 11 in (1.8 m)	Fr	Westlake High School	Thousand Oaks, California
G	23	Maria Mejia	5 ft 11 in (1.8 m)	Fr	Fairmont Prep	Mexicali, Mexico
F	30	Dieynaba Sylla	6 ft 2 in (1.88 m)	Sr	San Bernardino Valley College	Paris, France
F	32	Lucia Moreno Tallon	6 ft 2 in (1.88 m)	Fr	Les Lalaboral	Málaga, Spain
F	35	TT Hill-Brown	6 ft 2 in (1.88 m)	Sr	Utah State	Stockton, California
F	41	Bria Shine	6 ft 1 in (1.85 m)	GS	UC Davis	Sacramento, California

Head coach

- Brad Langston (San José State)

Assistant coach(es)

- Natasha Smith (Chico State)
- Jewelyn Huth (Long Beach State)
- Najé Murray (Syracuse)
- Lorenzo Griffin (Waldorf)

Legend

- (C) Team captain
- (S) Suspended
- (I) Ineligible
- (W) Walk-on
- Injured
- Current redshirt

Roster
Last update: December 31, 2025

== Schedule and results ==
Date time, TV	Rank^{#}	Opponent^{#}	Result	Record	High points	High rebounds	High assists	Site (attendance) city, state
Regular season
November 3, 2025*; 5:00 pm, ESPN+		at California Baptist; Crosstown Showdown	L 53–56	0–1	15 – Polk	9 – Duchemin	4 – Hackley	Fowler Events Center (1,085); Riverside, CA
November 6, 2025*; 5:00 pm, ESPN+		at Arizona	L 59–62	0–2	14 – Stanton	6 – Tied	4 – Tied	McKale Center (5,216); Tucson, AZ
November 14, 2025*; 6:00 pm, ESPN+		Saint Mary's	L 41–51	0–3	13 – Stanton	5 – Tied	2 – Hackley	SRC Arena (178); Riverside, CA
November 21, 2025*; 7:30 pm, ESPN+		at Idaho	L 75–89	0–4	15 – Swanson	8 – Wickstrom	4 – Wickstrom	ICCU Arena (355); Moscow, ID
November 23, 2025*; 1:00 pm, MWN		at Boise State	L 56−67	0−5	15 – Wickstrom	10 – Wickstrom	3 – Polk	ExtraMile Arena (1,617); Boise, ID
November 29, 2025*; 4:00 pm, ESPN+		Cal Lutheran	W 64−47	1−5	30 – Wickstrom	14 – Wickstrom	3 – Polk	SRC Arena (121); Riverside, CA
December 4, 2025; 6:00 pm, ESPN+		UC Irvine	L 40–77	1–6 (0–1)	14 – Wickstrom	6 – Hackley	2 – Wickstrom	SRC Arena (115); Riverside, CA
December 6, 2025; 4:00 pm, ESPN+		Cal Poly	W 63–46	2–6 (1–1)	22 – Wickstrom	7 – Tied	5 – Polk	SRC Arena (101); Riverside, CA
December 14, 2025*; 2:00 pm, ESPN+		at San Diego	L 56–63	2–7	17 – Wickstrom	6 – Wickstrom	5 – Mejia	Jenny Craig Pavilion (871); San Diego, CA
December 17, 2025*; 6:00 pm, ESPN+		at Utah	L 52–61	2–8	19 – Hackley	7 – Shine	2 – Tied	Jon M. Huntsman Center (2,126); Salt Lake City, UT
December 21, 2025*; 2:00 pm, ESPN+		Gonzaga	L 62–68	2–9	22 – Wickstrom	7 – Wickstrom	6 – Polk	SRC Arena (149); Riverside, CA
December 30, 2025*; 2:00 pm, ESPN+		UC Merced	W 93−52	3−9	30 – Wickstrom	6 – Tied	6 – Hackley	SRC Arena (183); Riverside, CA
January 1, 2026; 9:00 pm, ESPN+		at Hawai'i	W 65–58	4–9 (2–1)	36 – Wickstrom	7 – Polk	3 – Tied	Stan Sheriff Center (1,688); Honolulu, HI
January 8, 2026; 6:00 pm, ESPN+		Cal State Bakersfield	W 64–42	5–9 (3–1)	24 – Wickstrom	9 – Hackley	4 – Polk	SRC Arena (166); Riverside, CA
January 10, 2026; 4:00 pm, ESPN+		at UC San Diego	L 54–70	5–10 (3–2)	19 – Wickstrom	7 – Tied	3 – Polk	LionTree Arena (428); La Jolla, CA
January 15, 2026; 6:00 pm, ESPN+		Long Beach State	W 77–59	6–10 (4–2)	21 – Wickstrom	12 – Wickstrom	5 – Polk	SRC Arena (157); Riverside, CA
January 17, 2026; 2:00 pm, ESPN+		at Cal State Fullerton	L 71–83	6–11 (4–3)	28 – Wickstrom	12 – Shine	5 – Polk	Titan Gym (215); Fullerton, CA
January 22, 2026; 6:00 pm, ESPN+		at UC Irvine	L 68–74	6–12 (4–4)	30 – Wickstrom	10 – Shine	6 – Polk	Bren Events Center (467); Irvine, CA
January 24, 2026; 4:00 pm, ESPN+		UC Davis	L 68–81	6–13 (4–5)	26 – Wickstrom	6 – Tied	5 – Wickstrom	SRC Arena (160); Riverside, CA
January 29, 2026; 6:00 pm, ESPN+		at Long Beach State	L 72–75	6–14 (4–6)	28 – Wickstrom	10 – Wickstrom	5 – Tied	LBS Financial Credit Union Pyramid (654); Long Beach, CA
January 31, 2026; 2:00 pm, ESPN+		at Cal Poly	W 70–66	7–14 (5–6)	24 – Wickstrom	9 – Chocano	4 – Wickstrom	Mott Athletics Center (406); San Luis Obispo, CA
February 5, 2026; 6:00 pm, ESPN+		Cal State Fullerton	L 78–82 ^{OT}	7–15 (5–7)	35 – Wickstrom	6 – Tied	9 – Polk	SRC Arena (156); Riverside, CA
February 7, 2026; 4:00 pm, ESPN+		Cal State Northridge	L 53–58	7–16 (5–8)	23 – Wickstrom	10 – Wickstrom	5 – Polk	SRC Arena (101); Riverside, CA
February 12, 2026; 6:00 pm, ESPN+		at UC Santa Barbara	W 69–62	8–16 (6–8)	27 – Wickstrom	13 – Wickstrom	6 – Polk	The Thunderdome (633); Santa Barbara, CA
February 14, 2026; 4:00 pm, ESPN+		UC San Diego	L 68–79	8–17 (6–9)	17 – Wickstrom	10 – Wickstrom	7 – Polk	SRC Arena (167); Riverside, CA
February 19, 2026; 6:30 pm, ESPN+		at Cal State Bakersfield	W 62–58	9–17 (7–9)	24 – Wickstrom	9 – Wickstrom	3 – Hackley	Icardo Center (163); Bakersfield, CA
February 21, 2026; 2:00 pm, ESPN+		at UC Davis	L 56–65	9–18 (7–10)	31 – Wickstrom	7 – Wickstrom	2 – Tied	University Credit Union Center (678); Davis, CA
February 26, 2026; 6:00 pm, ESPN+		UC Santa Barbara	L 57–61	9–19 (7–11)	25 – Wickstrom	6 – Chocano	6 – Polk	SRC Arena (266); Riverside, CA
February 28, 2026; 2:00 pm, ESPN+		at Cal State Northridge	W 70–61	10–19 (8–11)	24 – Wickstrom	12 – Wickstrom	4 – Polk	Premier America Credit Union Arena (303); Northridge, CA
March 5, 2026; 6:00 pm, ESPN+		Hawai'i	L 56–89	10–20 (8–12)	14 – Wickstrom	6 – Chocano	4 – Wickstrom	SRC Arena (277); Riverside, CA
Big West tournament
March 11, 2026; 2:30 p.m., ESPN+	(7)	vs. (6) UC Santa Barbara; First round	W 58–53	11–20	26 – Wickstrom	9 – Wickstrom	5 – Shine	Lee's Family Forum (791); Henderson, NV
March 12, 2026; 2:30 p.m., ESPN+	(7)	vs. (3) UC Davis; Quarterfinals	L 59–70	11–21	26 – Wickstrom	7 – Wickstrom	5 – Polk	Lee's Family Forum (1,183); Henderson, NV
*Non-conference game. ^{#}Rankings from AP Poll. (#) Tournament seedings in parentheses. All times are in Pacific.
