= 2025–26 UC San Diego Tritons women's basketball team =

American college basketball season

2025–26 UC San Diego Tritons women's basketball

Big West regular-season co-champions Big West tournament champions

NCAA tournament, first round
- Conference: Big West Conference
- Record: 24–9 (17–3 Big West)
- Head coach: Heidi VanDerveer (14th season)
- Associate head coach: Vanessa Nygaard
- Assistant coaches: Britinee Yasukochi; PhyNique Allen; Alexandria Young; Miranda Seto
- Home arena: LionTree Arena

2025–26 Big West women's basketball standings
	Conf.				Overall
Team	W		L	PCT	W		L	PCT
UC Irvine	17	–	3	.850	26	–	7	.788
UC San Diego †	17	–	3	.850	24	–	9	.727
UC Davis	15	–	5	.750	23	–	11	.676
Hawai'i	14	–	6	.700	22	–	11	.667
Cal State Fullerton	13	–	7	.650	18	–	14	.563
UC Santa Barbara	12	–	8	.600	20	–	10	.667
UC Riverside	8	–	12	.400	11	–	21	.344
Cal State Northridge	6	–	14	.300	10	–	20	.333
Long Beach State	4	–	16	.200	5	–	25	.167
Cal State Bakersfield	2	–	18	.100	7	–	23	.233
Cal Poly	2	–	18	.100	4	–	26	.133
† 2026 Big West tournament winner

The 2025–26 UC San Diego Tritons women's basketball team represented the University of California, San Diego during the 2025–26 NCAA Division I women's basketball season. The Tritons, led by 14th-year head coach Heidi VanDerveer, played their home games at LionTree Arena in La Jolla, California as members of the Big West Conference.

This was the second year the team were eligible for the NCAA tournament, and the second consecutive season they made the tournament, winning the Big West tournament.

== Previous season ==
The Tritons finished the 2024–25 season 20–16, 13–7 in Big West play, to finish in a tie for third place. They received the 4 seed in the Big West tournament, where they won over Cal Poly in the quarterfinals, Hawaii in the semifinals and UC Davis in the championship game to win the Big West championship and clinch the automatic bid to the NCAA tournament. It marked UC San Diego's first NCAA D-I tournament appearance. They were seeded as the No.16 seed in the Spokane 1 region, where they fell to Southern in the First Four.

== Offseason ==
=== Departures ===
Departures
Name	Number	Pos.	Height	Year	Hometown	Reason for departure
Grace Talbot	2	G	5' 7"	Junior	Littleton, CO	Graduated
Sumayah Sugapong	3	G	5' 7"	Sophomore	San Diego, CA	Transferred to Arizona
Meaali'i Amosa	13	F	6' 1"	Senior	Garden Grove, CA	Graduated
Izzy Forsyth	20	F	6' 0"	Senior	Vancouver, BC	Transferred to Hawaii
Eri Blithikioti	23	G	5' 11"	Sophomore	Athens, Greece	Transferred to Northern Arizona
Kayanna Spriggs	24	F	6' 2"	Senior	San Diego, CA	Graduated
Parker Montgomery	32	G	5' 7"	Graduate Student	Porter Ranch, CA	Graduated
Emma Svaboda	33	C	6' 3"	Senior	La Quinta, CA	Graduated

=== Incoming transfers ===
Incoming transfers
Name	Number	Pos.	Height	Year	Hometown	Previous school
Makayla Rose	4	G	5' 7"	Senior	Roseville, CA	UC Riverside
Dymonique Maxie	10	G	5' 8"	Junior	Hayward, CA	Nevada

=== 2025 recruiting class ===
College recruiting
Name	Hometown	School	Height	Weight	Commit date
Michaela Fairwell; G	Irmo, SC	Dutch Fork High School	5 ft 11 in (1.80 m)	N/A	Nov 14, 2024
Michaela Fairwell; G	Recruit ratings: 247Sports:				
Tatum Jones; F	Aurora, CO	Mullen High School	6 ft 2 in (1.88 m)	N/A	
Tatum Jones; F	Recruit ratings: No ratings found				
Lev Feiman; G	Woodland Hills, CA	Brentwood High School	5 ft 9 in (1.75 m)	N/A	
Lev Feiman; G	Recruit ratings: No ratings found				
Niya Price; G/F	Lancaster, CA	Antelope Valley High School	6 ft 0 in (1.83 m)	N/A	
Niya Price; G/F	Recruit ratings: No ratings found				
Overall recruit ranking:
Note: In many cases, Scout, Rivals, 247Sports, On3, and ESPN may conflict in their listings of height and weight.; In these cases, the average was taken. ESPN grades are on a 100-point scale.; Sources:

== Preseason ==
=== Big West Conference Preseason Poll ===
The Big West Conference released its preseason coaches' poll on October 16, 2025. The Tritons were predicted to finish fourth in the conference with 77 points and two first-place votes.

Big West Preseason Poll
Place	Team	Points
1	Hawai'i	91 (4)
2	UC Irvine	90 (4)
3	UC Davis	83 (1)
4	UC San Diego	77 (2)
5	UC Santa Barbara	61
6	Long Beach State	57
7	UC Riverside	51
8	Cal Poly	34
9	Cal State Northridge	27
10	Cal State Fullerton	20
11	Cal State Bakersfield	14
(#) first-place votes

=== Big West Preseason All-Big West Team ===
Junior forward/center Erin Condron was named to the preseason All-Big West Team.

Player	School
Skylar Burke	UC Santa Barbara
Erin Condron	UC San Diego
Shelley Duchemin	UC Riverside
Hunter Hernandez	UC Irvine
Megan Norris	UC Davis
Imani Perez	Hawai'i
Ritorya Tamilo	Hawai'i

== Roster ==
2025–26 UC San Diego Tritons women's basketball team
Players
Coaches

Pos.	#	Name	Height	Year	Previous school	Hometown
G	2	Michaela Fairwell	5 ft 11 in (1.8 m)	Fr	Dutch Fork High School	Irmo, SC
F	3	Tatum Jones	6 ft 2 in (1.88 m)	Fr	Mullen High School	Aurora, CO
G	4	Makayla Rose	5 ft 7 in (1.7 m)	Sr	UC Riverside	Roseville, CA
G	5	Gabby Louther	5 ft 11 in (1.8 m)	Sr	Pueblo West High School	Pueblo West, CO
G	10	Dymonique Maxie	5 ft 8 in (1.73 m)	Jr	Nevada	Hayward, CA
F/C	11	Erin Condron	6 ft 4 in (1.93 m)	Jr	Braemar College	Woodend, Australia
G	12	Rosa Smith	5 ft 7 in (1.7 m)	RS Jr	Idaho	Kirkland, WA
G	13	Lev Feiman	5 ft 9 in (1.75 m)	Fr	Brentwood School	Woodland Hills, CA
G	15	Sabrina Ma	5 ft 10 in (1.78 m)	Sr	San Jose State	San Francisco, CA
G/F	21	Nicki Polocheck	6 ft 0 in (1.83 m)	So	Memorial Senior High School	Houston, TX
G	22	Gracie Gallegos	6 ft 1 in (1.85 m)	RS Jr	Mullen High School	Denver, CO
G/F	24	Niya Price	6 ft 0 in (1.83 m)	Fr	Antelope Valley High School	Lancaster, CA
G	25	Junaé Mahan	5 ft 8 in (1.73 m)	RS Jr	Lincoln High School	Stockton, CA
F	30	Damilola Sule	6 ft 0 in (1.83 m)	GS	UC Merced	Bakersfield, CA

Head coach

- Heidi VanDerveer (College of Charleston)

Assistant coach(es)

- Vanessa Nygaard (Stanford)
- Britinee Yasukochi (Occidental)
- PhyNique Allen (Cal State Bakersfield)
- Alexandria Young (San Diego)
- Miranda Seto (UC San Diego)

Legend

- (C) Team captain
- (S) Suspended
- (I) Ineligible
- (W) Walk-on
- Injured
- Current redshirt

Roster
Last update: October 23, 2025

== Schedule and results ==
Date time, TV	Rank^{#}	Opponent^{#}	Result	Record	High points	High rebounds	High assists	Site (attendance) city, state
Regular season
November 3, 2025*; 6:00 p.m., ESPN+		at Pacific	L 66–69	0–1	16 – Rose	8 – Condron	4 – Maxie	Alex G. Spanos Center (1,038); Stockton, CA
November 7, 2025*; 6:00 p.m., ESPN+		Denver	W 72–54	1–1	19 – Ma	8 – Maxie	3 – Maxie	LionTree Arena (1,292); San Diego, CA
November 12, 2025*; 6:00 p.m., ESPN+		Sacramento State	L 60–71	1–2	15 – Feiman	9 – Condron	4 – Condron	LionTree Arena (341); San Diego, CA
November 16, 2025*; 2:00 p.m., ESPN+		at San Francisco	L 69–80	1–3	16 – Condron	8 – Condron	3 – Condron	Sobrato Center (569); San Francisco, CA
November 22, 2025*; 2:00 p.m., ESPN+		Air Force	W 55–43	2–3	12 – Condron	7 – Rose	5 – Rose	LionTree Arena (1,282); San Diego, CA
November 24, 2025*; 6:00 p.m., ESPN+		Occidental	W 87–39	3–3	22 – Ma	11 – Condron	8 – Smith	LionTree Arena (1,183); San Diego, CA
November 28, 2025*; 7:00 p.m., B1G+		at No. 22 Washington	L 50–67	3–4	19 – Smith	15 – Condron	3 – Smith	Alaska Airlines Arena (2,530); Seattle, WA
November 30, 2025*; 2:00 p.m., ESPN+		at Portland State	W 94–54	4–4	21 – Ma	9 – Condron	11 – Maxie	Viking Pavilion (310); Portland, OR
December 6, 2025; 1:00 p.m., SPECSN		Long Beach State	W 75–45	5–4 (1–0)	27 – Smith	7 – Condron	6 – Maxie	LionTree Arena (245); San Diego, CA
December 15, 2025*; 6:00 p.m., ESPN+		at California Baptist	W 67–59	6–4	15 – Condron	13 – Condron	5 – Maxie	Fowler Events Center (368); Riverside, CA
December 20, 2025*; 2:00 p.m., ESPN+		Northern Arizona	L 68–71	6–5	16 – Condron	6 – 2 tied	6 – Maxie	LionTree Arena (246); San Diego, CA
January 1, 2026; 12:00 p.m., ESPN+		Cal Poly	W 76–54	7–5 (2–0)	21 – Smith	6 – Condron	8 – Smith	LionTree Arena (410); San Diego, CA
January 3, 2026; 9:00 p.m., ESPN+		at Hawaii	W 65–54	8–5 (3–0)	16 – Condron	6 – Ma	6 – Maxie	Stan Sheriff Center (1,731); Honolulu, HI
January 8, 2026; 7:00 p.m., ESPN+		at Cal State Fullerton	W 81–69 ^{OT}	9–5 (4–0)	22 – Rose	8 – Rose	10 – Maxie	Titan Gym (245); Fullerton, CA
January 10, 2026; 4:00 p.m., ESPN+		UC Riverside	W 70–54	10–5 (5–0)	22 – Condron	12 – Condron	4 – Smith	LionTree Arena (428); San Diego, CA
January 15, 2026; 6:00 p.m., ESPN+		at Cal State Northridge	W 60–48	11–5 (6–0)	23 – Ma	11 – Condron	3 – Maxie	Premier America Credit Union Arena (385); Northridge, CA
January 17, 2026; 4:00 p.m., ESPN+		Cal State Bakersfield	W 84–66	12–5 (7–0)	21 – 2 tied	8 – 2 tied	6 – Maxie	LionTree Arena (425); San Diego, CA
January 22, 2026; 6:00 p.m., ESPN+		UC Davis	L 62–66	12–6 (7–1)	21 – Condron	10 – Condron	4 – 2 tied	LionTree Arena (537); San Diego, CA
January 24, 2026; 2:00 p.m., ESPN+		at UC Irvine	W 68–66	13–6 (8–1)	20 – Smith	8 – Polocheck	5 – Rose	Bren Events Center (711); Irvine, CA
January 29, 2026; 6:00 p.m., ESPN+		at UC Santa Barbara	W 52–49	14–6 (9–1)	11 – 2 tied	9 – Condron	4 – 2 tied	The Thunderdome (657); Santa Barbara, CA
January 31, 2026; 4:00 p.m., ESPN+		Cal State Northridge	W 82–67	15–6 (10–1)	18 – Rose	7 – Condron	5 – 2 tied	LionTree Arena (743); San Diego, CA
February 5, 2026; 6:00 p.m., ESPN+		at Long Beach State	W 64–53	16–6 (11–1)	32 – Condron	13 – Condron	4 – 2 tied	LBS Financial Credit Union Pyramid (571); Long Beach, CA
February 7, 2026; 4:00 p.m., ESPN+		Hawaii	W 59–46	17–6 (12–1)	28 – Rose	6 – Ma	6 – Rose	LionTree Arena (1,082); San Diego, CA
February 12, 2026; 6:00 p.m., ESPN+		at UC Davis	L 80–88 ^{3OT}	17–7 (12–2)	22 – Condron	11 – Condron	5 – Maxie	University Credit Union Center (548); Davis, CA
February 14, 2026; 4:00 p.m., ESPN+		at UC Riverside	W 79–68	18–7 (13–2)	20 – Rose	6 – 2 tied	7 – Maxie	SRC Arena (167); Riverside, CA
February 21, 2026; 4:00 p.m., ESPN+		UC Irvine	L 78–80	18–8 (13–3)	16 – Rose	11 – Condron	7 – Maxie	LionTree Arena (783); San Diego, CA
February 26, 2026; 6:30 p.m., ESPN+		at Cal State Bakersfield	W 85–79	19–8 (14–3)	19 – Rose	9 – Condron	2 – Maxie	Icardo Center (138); Bakersfield, CA
February 28, 2026; 2:00 p.m., ESPN+		at Cal Poly	W 85–61	20–8 (15–3)	16 – Rose	12 – Condron	6 – Maxie	Mott Athletics Center (424); San Luis Obispo, CA
March 5, 2026; 6:00 p.m., ESPN+		Cal State Fullerton	W 77–69	21–8 (16–3)	23 – Condron	9 – Condron	5 – 2 tied	LionTree Arena (687); San Diego, CA
March 7, 2026; 4:00 p.m., ESPN+		UC Santa Barbara	W 72–65	22–8 (17–3)	25 – Rose	8 – Condron	4 – 2 tied	LionTree Arena (1,008); San Diego, CA
Big West women's tournament
March 13, 2026; 2:30 p.m., ESPN+	(2)	vs. (3) UC Davis; Semifinals	W 84–79	23–8	21 – Ma	6 – 3 tied	6 – Condron	Lee's Family Forum (1,502); Henderson, NV
March 14, 2026; 3:00 p.m., ESPN+	(2)	vs. (4) Hawaii; Finals	W 60–48	24–8	22 – Condron	14 – Condron	5 – 2 tied	Lee's Family Forum (0); Henderson, NV
NCAA tournament
March 20, 2026*; 9:00 a.m., ESPN	(14 S4)	at (3 S4) No. 14 TCU; First round	L 40–86	24–9	12 – Condron	6 – 2 tied	3 – Ma	Schollmaier Arena; Fort Worth, TX
*Non-conference game. ^{#}Rankings from AP poll. (#) Tournament seedings in parentheses. Sacramento 4=S4. All times are in Pacific.
