= 2025–26 UC Irvine Anteaters women's basketball team =

American college basketball season

2025–26 UC Irvine Anteaters women's basketball

Big West regular season co-champions Great Alaska Shootout Champions

WBIT First Round, 55–61
- Conference: Big West Conference
- Record: 26–7 (17–3 Big West)
- Head coach: Tamara Inoue (10th season)
- Associate head coach: Cecilia Russell-Nava (10th season)
- Assistant coaches: Tyler Ellis (7th season); Derek Wynn (4th season); Lauren Saiki (1st season)
- MVP: Hunter Hernandez
- Home arena: Bren Events Center (Capacity: 5,000)

2025–26 Big West women's basketball standings
	Conf.				Overall
Team	W		L	PCT	W		L	PCT
UC Irvine	17	–	3	.850	26	–	7	.788
UC San Diego †	17	–	3	.850	24	–	9	.727
UC Davis	15	–	5	.750	23	–	11	.676
Hawai'i	14	–	6	.700	22	–	11	.667
Cal State Fullerton	13	–	7	.650	18	–	14	.563
UC Santa Barbara	12	–	8	.600	20	–	10	.667
UC Riverside	8	–	12	.400	11	–	21	.344
Cal State Northridge	6	–	14	.300	10	–	20	.333
Long Beach State	4	–	16	.200	5	–	25	.167
Cal State Bakersfield	2	–	18	.100	7	–	23	.233
Cal Poly	2	–	18	.100	4	–	26	.133
† 2026 Big West tournament winner

The 2025–26 UC Irvine Anteaters women's basketball team will represent the University of California, Irvine in the 2025–26 NCAA Division I women's basketball season. They will play their home games at the Bren Events Center in Irvine, California as a member of the Big West Conference. The Anteaters will be led by 10th-year head coach Tamara Inoue. On the final game of the regular season versus UC Davis, UC Irvine recorded their 26th win, a new program record. After losing to Hawai'i in the semifinals of the Big West tournament, the Anteaters were not selected to play in the NCAA tournament. They received an automatic bid to the Women's Basketball Invitation Tournament, as they won the Big West regular season. It is their first such appearance, as the tournament was created in 2024. They lost to San Diego State in the first round.

== Previous season ==
The 2024–25 Anteaters team finished 21–10, including a 15–5 conference record. They were ousted in the Big West tournament final by UC Davis, losing 56–63. They did not receive a bid to the WBIT, as conference regular season champion Hawai'i did.

== Offseason ==
=== Preseason Polls ===
The Big West Media Poll was released on October 13, 2025. This is the inaugural media poll for the Big West Conference, conducted by the UCSD Guardian. It was sent out to student journalists and radio broadcasters from other member schools across the conference. The Big West Coaches' Poll was released on October 16, 2025. This is the third consecutive year UC Irvine is predicted to finish second in the Big West Conference.

Media Poll
Pos.	Team	Points
1	Hawai'i	83 (5)
2	UC Irvine	80 (3)
3	UC Davis	68 (1)
4	UC San Diego	62
5	UC Santa Barbara	54
6	Long Beach State	44
7	UC Riverside	42
8	Cal Poly	34
9	Cal State Fullerton	16
10	Cal State Bakersfield	8
11	Cal State Northridge	4

Coaches' Poll
Pos.	Team	Points
1	Hawai'i	91 (4)
2	UC Irvine	90 (4)
3	UC Davis	83 (1)
4	UC San Diego	77 (2)
5	UC Santa Barbara	61
6	Long Beach State	57
7	UC Riverside	51
8	Cal Poly	34
9	Cal State Northridge	27
10	Cal State Fullerton	20
11	Cal State Bakersfield	14

== Roster ==
2025–26 UC Irvine Anteaters women's basketball team
Players
Coaches

Pos.	#	Name	Height	Year	Previous school	Hometown
PG	1	Ameerah Grant	5 ft 4 in (1.63 m)	Fr	Brown Deer High School	Brown Deer, WI
G	2	Haley Hernandez	5 ft 11 in (1.8 m)	Jr	Archbishop Mitty High School	San Jose, CA
G	8	Kianna Wormly	5 ft 7 in (1.7 m)	Fr	Vista Ridge High School	Cedar Park, TX
F	9	Daniela Falcón Hernández	6 ft 2 in (1.88 m)	So	Utah	Las Palmas, Spain
G	10	Lauryn Madsen	5 ft 11 in (1.8 m)	So	Warden High School	Warden, WA
PG	12	Shirel Nahum	5 ft 9 in (1.75 m)	Jr	Wingate Academy	Ra'anana, Israel
F	13	Nohe'alani Stores	6 ft 2 in (1.88 m)	Fr	Mater Dei High School	East Palo Alto, CA
F	14	Summah Hanson	6 ft 3 in (1.91 m)	Jr	Sacramento State	Brisbane, Australia
G	20	Hunter Hernandez	5 ft 9 in (1.75 m)	Sr	Archbishop Mitty High School	San Jose, CA
PG	21	Despoina Baltzi	5 ft 8 in (1.73 m)	Fr	Fryganiotis Schools	Rhodes, Greece
G	22	Reese Noa	5 ft 9 in (1.75 m)	So	North Torrance High School	Harbor City, CA
G	23	Jada Wynn	6 ft 1 in (1.85 m)	Sr	Texas Tech	Yorba Linda, CA
G	24	Naomy Zonzon-Huyghe	5 ft 9 in (1.75 m)	So	Arizona Western College	La Roche-sur-Yon, France

Head coach

- Tamara Inoue (Long Beach State)

Assistant coach(es)

- Cecilia Russell-Nava (New Mexico State)
- Derek Wynn (Cal State Fullerton)
- Tyler Ellis (New Mexico State)
- Lauren Saiki (UC Irvine)

Legend

- (C) Team captain
- (S) Suspended
- (I) Ineligible
- (W) Walk-on
- Injured
- Current redshirt

Roster
Last update: October 16, 2025

== Schedule and results ==
Date time, TV	Rank^{#}	Opponent^{#}	Result	Record	High points	High rebounds	High assists	Site (attendance) city, state
Regular season
November 5, 2025*; 11:00 am, ESPN+		San Diego	W 72–54	1–0	17 – Wynn	8 – Madsen	7 – Wynn	Bren Events Center (1,204); Irvine, CA
November 9, 2025*; 1:00 pm, ESPN+		at Arizona	L 61–75	1–1	23 – Hu. Hernandez	9 – Wynn	3 – Madsen	McKale Center (5,268); Tucson, AZ
November 12, 2025*; 7:00 pm, ESPN+		at Idaho State	L 49–61	1–2	12 – Madsen	9 – Stores	4 – Grant	Reed Gym (807); Pocatello, ID
November 15, 2025*; 4:00 pm, ESPN+		Northern Arizona	W 90–75	2–2	23 – Nahum	11 – Tied	6 – Wynn	Bren Events Center (560); Irvine, CA
November 21, 2025*; 6:15 pm, GNAC Network		vs. Bowling Green; ASRC/ConocoPhillips Great Alaska Shootout Semifinals	W 75–50	3–2	15 – Madsen	12 – Wynn	6 – Wynn	Alaska Airlines Center (2,001); Anchorage, AK
November 22, 2025*; 8:30 pm, GNAC Network		vs. St. Thomas; ASRC/ConocoPhillips Great Alaska Shootout Championship Game	W 63–55	4–2	20 – Wynn	9 – Wynn	4 – Nahum	Alaska Airlines Center (2,101); Anchorage, AK
November 28, 2025*; 2:00 pm, ESPN+		Wichita State; Zotgiving Classic	W 58–52	5–2	20 – Hu. Hernandez	8 – Wynn	3 – Tied	Bren Events Center (340); Irvine, CA
November 29, 2025*; 4:30 pm, ESPN+		Colgate; Zotgiving Classic	W 82–48	6–2	18 – Wynn	6 – Wynn	7 – Nahum	Bren Events Center (541); Irvine, CA
December 4, 2025; 6:00 pm		at UC Riverside; Big West Bold Week	W 77–40	7–2 (1–0)	16 – Hu. Hernandez	13 – Wynn	4 – Wynn	SRC Arena (115); Riverside, CA
December 6, 2025; 2:00 pm		at Cal State Northridge; Big West Bold Week	W 72–46	8–2 (2–0)	31 – Hu. Hernandez	12 – Wynn	2 – Wynn	Premier America Credit Union Arena (359); Northridge, CA
December 13, 2025*; 2:00 pm, ESPN+		California Baptist	W 77–57	9–2	27 – Hu. Hernandez	11 – Wynn	4 – Tied	Bren Events Center (441); Irvine, CA
December 16, 2025*; 6:00 pm, ESPN+		at New Mexico State	W 83–66	10–2	19 – Grant	8 – Hanson	5 – Hu. Hernandez	Pan American Center (344); Las Cruces, NM
December 18, 2025*; 6:00 pm, ESPN+		at UTEP	W 93–72	11–2	36 – Hu. Hernandez	7 – Wynn	7 – Wynn	Don Haskins Center (905); El Paso, TX
January 1, 2026; 2:00 pm, ESPN+		Cal State Bakersfield	W 82–63	12–2 (3–0)	27 – Hu. Hernandez	11 – Hu. Hernandez	4 – Hu. Hernandez	Bren Events Center (717); Irvine, CA
January 3, 2026; 4:00 pm, ESPN+		Cal State Fullerton	W 64–51	13–2 (4–0)	26 – Hu. Hernandez	9 – Hanson	4 – Wynn	Bren Events Center (659); Irvine, CA
January 8, 2026; 6:00 pm, ESPN+		at Long Beach State; Black and Blue Rivalry	W 78–59	14–2 (5–0)	21 – Hu. Hernandez	8 – Hanson	5 – Wynn	LBS Financial Credit Union Pyramid (639); Long Beach, CA
January 10, 2026; 2:00 pm, ESPN+/SSN		Hawai'i	W 50–47	15–2 (6–0)	20 – Hu. Hernandez	8 – Tied	5 – Tied	Bren Events Center (713); Irvine, CA
January 17, 2026; 2:00 pm, ESPN+		UC Davis	W 73–42	16–2 (7–0)	24 – Wynn	8 – Wynn	4 – Hu. Hernandez	Bren Events Center (972); Irvine, CA
January 22, 2026; 6:00 pm, ESPN+		UC Riverside	W 74–68	17–2 (8–0)	20 – Hu. Hernandez	7 – Tied	6 – Wynn	Bren Events Center (467); Irvine, CA
January 24, 2026; 2:00 pm, ESPN+		UC San Diego	L 66–68	17–3 (8–1)	19 – Hu. Hernandez	10 – Hu. Hernandez	5 – Wynn	Bren Events Center (711); Irvine, CA
January 29, 2026; 9:00 pm, ESPN+		at Hawai'i	L 50–55	17–4 (8–2)	17 – Wynn	10 – Hu. Hernandez	3 – Wynn	Stan Sheriff Center (1,820); Honolulu, HI
February 5, 2026; 6:30 pm, ESPN+		at Cal State Bakersfield	W 85–53	18–4 (9–2)	15 – Tied	8 – Wynn	3 – Tied	Icardo Center (112); Bakersfield, CA
February 7, 2026; 2:00 pm, ESPN+		UC Santa Barbara	W 63–41	19–4 (10–2)	15 – Hu. Hernandez	13 – Hanson	3 – Tied	Bren Events Center (722); Irvine, CA
February 12, 2026; 6:00 pm, ESPN+		Cal Poly	W 84–39	20–4 (11–2)	21 – Wynn	12 – Zonzon-Huyghe	6 – Hu. Hernandez	Bren Events Center (580); Irvine, CA
February 14, 2026; 2:00 pm, ESPN+		at Cal State Fullerton	W 77–71	21–4 (12–2)	30 – Hu. Hernandez	6 – Stores	7 – Nahum	Titan Gym (423); Fullerton, CA
February 19, 2026; 6:00 pm, ESPN+		Long Beach State; Black and Blue Rivalry	W 77–62	22–4 (13–2)	19 – Hu. Hernandez	4 – Tied	6 – Wynn	Bren Events Center (741); Irvine, CA
February 21, 2026; 4:00 pm, ESPN+		at UC San Diego	W 70–68	23–4 (14–2)	20 – Wynn	8 – Wynn	2 – Tied	LionTree Arena (783); San Diego, CA
February 26, 2026; 6:00 pm, ESPN+		Cal State Northridge	W 60–57	24–4 (15–2)	18 – Hu. Hernandez	12 – Wynn	4 – Tied	Bren Events Center (645); Irvine, CA
February 28, 2026; 2:00 pm, SSN		at UC Santa Barbara	L 62–70	24–5 (15–3)	26 – Hu. Hernandez	9 – Wynn	4 – Hu. Hernandez	The Thunderdome (1,289); Santa Barbara, CA
March 5, 2026; 6:00 pm, ESPN+		at Cal Poly	W 85–65	25–5 (16–3)	41 – Hu. Hernandez	6 – Hanson	5 – Zonzon-Huyghe	Mott Athletics Center (409); San Luis Obispo, CA
March 7, 2026; 2:00 pm, ESPN+		at UC Davis	W 70–58	26–5 (17–3)	24 – Hu. Hernandez	7 – Falcon Hernandez	5 – Wynn	University Credit Union Center (977); Davis, CA
Big West tournament
March 13, 2026; 12:00 pm, ESPN+	(1)	vs. (4) Hawai'i; Semifinals	L 63–67 ^{OT}	26–6	33 – Hu. Hernandez	8 – Hu. Hernandez	4 – Tied	Lee's Family Forum (1,502); Henderson, NV
WBIT tournament
March 19, 2026; 6:00 pm, ESPN+		vs. (4) San Diego State; First Round	L 55–61	26–7	19 – Hu. Hernandez	9 – Wynn	4 – Hu. Hernandez	Jenny Craig Pavilion (858); San Diego, CA
*Non-conference game. ^{#}Rankings from AP Poll. (#) Tournament seedings in parentheses.

== Rankings ==
Ranking movements Legend: — = Not ranked
	Week																				
Poll	Pre	1	2	3	4	5	6	7	8	9	10	11	12	13	14	15	16	17	18	19	Final
AP	—	—	—	—	—	—	—	—	—	—	—	—	—	—	—	—	—	—	—	—	
Coaches	—	—	—	—	—	—	—	—	—	—	—	—	—	—	—	—	—	—	—	—	
