= 2025 Great Alaska Shootout =

American college basketball tournament

- Season: 2025–26
- Teams: 4
- Finals site: Alaska Airlines Center, Anchorage, Alaska
- Champions: UC Irvine
- MVP: Jada Wynn, UC Irvine

The 2025 ASRC/ConocoPhillips Great Alaska Shootout was the 43rd and most recent edition of the Great Alaska Shootout, an annual college basketball tournament that features colleges from all over the United States. All games were played at the Alaska Airlines Center in Anchorage, Alaska. The event took place November 21 through November 22, 2025 with four in the tournament. Every games was televised on GNAC Network. In championship game, UC Irvine defeated St. Thomas.

== Bracket ==
* – Denotes overtime period

First Round; November 21
UC Irvine	75
Bowling Green	50
St. Thomas	77
Alaska Anchorage	60

Championship Game; November 22
UC Irvine	63
St. Thomas	55
3rd Place Game; November 23
Bowling Green	67
Alaska Anchorage	63
