= UC Irvine Anteaters women's basketball =

Collegiate women's basketball team

UC Irvine Anteaters
2026–27 UC Irvine Anteaters women's basketball team
- University: University of California, Irvine
- Head coach: Tamara Inoue (11th season)
- Location: Irvine, California
- Arena: Bren Events Center (capacity: 5,000)
- Conference: Big West
- Nickname: Anteaters
- Colors: Blue and gold

NCAA Division I tournament appearances
- 1995, 2024

Conference tournament champions
- 1995, 2024

Conference regular-season champions
- 2023, 2026

Uniforms
Home	Away	Alternate

The UC Irvine Anteaters women's basketball team is the basketball team that represents the University of California, Irvine. The team currently competes in the Big West Conference, NCAA Division I.

== History ==
Since beginning play in 1974, UC Irvine has (as of the end of the 2020–21 season) an all-time record of 517–793. The Anteaters have won the conference tournament twice (in 1995 & 2024), with five losses in the tournament championship game (1984, 1985, 1997, 2021, 2022) UC Irvine hired Tamara Inoue as their new head coach for the 2016–17 season. Inoue came to UC Irvine from New Mexico State where she was an integral member of the women's basketball staff from 2011 until 2016. She spent her last two seasons as an associate head coach and also served as the interim Senior Woman Administrator in 2015–16. After taking over a team that won a total of 12 games at Irvine in the two seasons prior to her arrival, Inoue brought a renewed energy and mindset that paid off immediately. In 2017–18, just her second year as head coach and first with her own recruits, Inoue led the Anteaters to an 18–14 overall record and their first national postseason appearance since 1995. The 18 victories more than doubled their win total from each of the previous three campaigns. The ‘Eaters also saw a 12.5 game improvement from 2016–17, tying for the second-best turnaround in all of NCAA Division I. UCI, which was picked eighth in the Big West Preseason Poll, placed third in the regular-season standings at 10–6, marking its best conference finish since 2011–12. The Anteaters ended the year ranked first in the league and 13th in the nation with 11.1 steals per outing. They also established UC Irvine’s highest single-game scoring total in the NCAA Division I Championship era, and tied an overall school record, with 107 points vs. Cal Poly. Inoue’s group set the tone for the record-breaking campaign with a dramatic season-opening victory over Utah State. They erased a 13-point deficit over the final four minutes and capped the rally by sinking a half-court shot at the buzzer for an 87–84 win. The game-winning play was featured at No. 1 on SportsCenter's Top-10 that evening. Inoue saw two of her student-athletes earn All-Big West accolades, highlighted by Jordan Sanders, who became just the second player in UCI history to be named the Big West Freshman of the Year. In 2018–19, Inoue guided the Anteaters to the third 20-win campaign in program history and the first since 1984–85. They had their best start ever at 7–0 with the seven consecutive victories tying UC Irvine’s third-longest win streak. Their success did not go unnoticed as the ‘Eaters made their debut in the College Insider Mid-Major Poll and rose to as high as No. 15 in the nation. UCI went on to make its first appearance in the Big West Tournament semifinals in five years. As a team, the Anteaters finished among the top-25 in the nation in turnover margin (7th), turnovers forced (22nd), and steals (23rd). Individually, Andee Ritter broke the all-time school record in 3-pointers made and steals. She graduated as UC Irvine’s single-game (8), single-season (87), and career (202) leader in threes made. Jordan Sanders was named to the All-Big West First Team after ranking second in the conference and 23rd in the country with 20.3 points per game. In 2019-2020, the ‘Eaters tied for second in the Big West regular-season standings, which was their best conference finish in Inoue’s tenure. At 9–7, it was the third-straight year they were at or above .500 in league play. Lauren Saiki established a single-season school record with 215 assists and earned first-team All-Big West honors. Sophia Locandro also garnered honorable mention and All-Freshman Team recognition.

== Year by Year Records ==
Season	Record	Conference record	Coach
2016–17	5–26	3–13	Tamara Inoue
2017–18	18–14	10–6	Tamara Inoue
2018–19	20–11	8–8	Tamara Inoue
2019–20	13–18	9–7	Tamara Inoue
2020–21	15–9	11–4	Tamara Inoue
2021–22	21–12	13–4	Tamara Inoue
2022–23	25–7	16–2	Tamara Inoue
2023–24	21–8	16–4	Tamara Inoue
2024–25	21–10	15–5	Tamara Inoue
2025–26	26–6	17–3	Tamara Inoue

== Postseason ==
=== NCAA Division I Tournament appearances ===
UC Irvine has appeared in the NCAA Division I women's basketball tournament twice, having a record of 0–2.

Year	Seed	Round	Opponent	Result
1995	#15	First Round	#2 Stanford	L 55–88
2024	#13	First Round	#4 Gonzaga	L 56–75

=== WBIT appearances ===
UC Irvine have appeared in one WBIT Tournament. Their record is 0–1.

Year	Round	Opponent	Result
2026	First Round	San Diego State	L 55–61

=== WNIT appearances ===
UC Irvine have appeared in two WNIT Tournaments. Their record is 1–2.

Year	Round	Opponent	Result
2022	First Round	UCLA	L 48–61
2023	First Round; Second Round	San Diego State; San Diego	W 55–45; L 48–58

=== WBI appearances ===
UC Irvine have appeared in one WBI Tournaments. Their record is 0–1.

Year	Round	Opponent	Result
2018	First round	Nevada	L 60–70
