= 2025–26 Summit League women's basketball season =

- League: NCAA Division I
- Sport: Basketball
- Teams: 9
- TV partner(s): Summit League Network, CBS Sports Network

Regular season
- Regular season champion: North Dakota State
- Season MVP: Avery Koenen, North Dakota State

Summit League tournament
- Champions: South Dakota State
- Runners-up: North Dakota State
- Tournament MVP: Brooklyn Meyer, South Dakota State

Summit League women's basketball seasons
- ← 2024–25 2026–27 →

2025–26 Summit League women's basketball standings
	Conf.				Overall
Team	W		L	PCT	W		L	PCT
North Dakota State	15	–	1	.938	29	–	5	.853
South Dakota State †	14	–	2	.875	27	–	7	.794
South Dakota	12	–	4	.750	26	–	10	.722
Oral Roberts	8	–	8	.500	15	–	15	.500
St. Thomas	8	–	8	.500	16	–	16	.500
Denver	5	–	11	.313	11	–	19	.367
Kansas City	4	–	12	.250	7	–	23	.233
North Dakota	3	–	13	.188	7	–	24	.226
Omaha	3	–	13	.188	6	–	27	.182
† 2026 Summit League tournament winner

The 2025–26 Summit League women's basketball season began non-conference play on November 3, 2025. Conference play began on December 31, 2025, and ended on February 28, 2026. This was the nineteenth season of women's basketball play under the Summit League name and forty-fourth for the conference overall.

This was the last season in the conference for Denver, as the Pioneers joined the West Coast Conference on July 1, 2026.

North Dakota State finished league play with a 15–1 record as the regular season champion. The 2026 Summit League women's basketball tournament took place from March 4 to 8, 2026. South Dakota State won the tournament, defeating North Dakota State in the tournament final, and advanced to the NCAA tournament. In the NCAA tournament, the Jackrabbits were seeded 11th in Sacramento 4 region and played 6th seeded Washington. They would fall to the Huskies, 72–54. North Dakota State received an automatic bid to the Women's Basketball Invitation Tournament (WBIT), and due to being named as one of the first four teams out of the NCAA tournament - they received a top seed in their region. The Bison defeated Chattanooga in the first round, but lost to Columbia in the second round. South Dakota received an at-large bid to the Women's National Invitation Tournament (WNIT). After receiving a first round bye, the Coyotes would defeat Northern Colorado in the second round, Pepperdine in the Super 16, and Montana State in the Great 8, before losing to Illinois State in the Fab 4.

== Preseason ==
The preseason Summit League women's basketball poll and awards were released on October 8, 2025.

=== Preseason poll ===
First place votes in parentheses

1. South Dakota State (34) – 558
2. North Dakota State (2) – 498
3. Oral Roberts – 410
4. South Dakota – 320
5. St. Thomas – 305
6. Kansas City – 291
7. North Dakota – 251
8. Omaha – 121
9. Denver – 101

=== Preseason awards ===
Honor	Recipient
Preseason Player of the Year	Brooklyn Meyer, South Dakota State
Preseason All-Summit League First Team	Emani Bennett, Kansas City
Preseason All-Summit League First Team	Avery Koenen, North Dakota State
Preseason All-Summit League First Team	Madison Mathiowetz, South Dakota State
Preseason All-Summit League First Team	Brooklyn Meyer, South Dakota State
Preseason All-Summit League First Team	Jalei Oglesby, Oral Roberts
Preseason All-Summit League First Team	Jocelyn Schiller, North Dakota State
Preseason All-Summit League Second Team	Walker Demers, North Dakota
Preseason All-Summit League Second Team	Marisa Frost, North Dakota State
Preseason All-Summit League Second Team	Maggie Hartwig, South Dakota State
Preseason All-Summit League Second Team	Angelina Robles, South Dakota
Preseason All-Summit League Second Team	Katie Vasecka, South Dakota State

== Regular season ==
=== Records against other conferences ===
2025–26 records against non-conference foes as of February 1, 2026:

Major 6 Conferences	Record	Major 6 Conferences	Record
ACC	0–2	American	3–1
Big East	1–1	Big Ten	0–4
Big 12	2–8	SEC	0–4
Major 6 Total			6–20
Other Division I Conferences	Record	Other Division I Conferences	Record
Atlantic 10	None	ASUN	0–3
America East	0–1	Big Sky	12–10
Big South	None	Big West	1–3
CAA	2–1	Conference USA	0–2
Horizon League	0–3	Ivy League	0–1
Independents	None	MAAC	None
MAC	2–1	MEAC	None
MVC	5–2	MWC	2–4
NEC	None	OVC	1–4
Patriot League	0–1	SoCon	None
Southland	3–0	SWAC	2–0
Sun Belt	None	WAC	1–3
WCC	2–3		
Other Division I Total			33–42
NCAA Division I Total			39–62
NCAA Division II Total			6–0
NCAA Division III Total			4–0
NAIA Total			12–0
NCCAA Total			0–0
Total Non-Conference Record			61–62

=== Record against ranked non-conference opponents ===
This will be a list of games against ranked opponents only (rankings from the AP Poll):
Summit League teams in bold

Date	Visitor	Home	Site	Score	Conference record	Ref
November 3, 2025	**St. Thomas**	No. 14 Iowa State	Hilton Coliseum ● Ames, IA	**L 36**–85	0–1	
November 9, 2025	**Oral Roberts**	No. 22 Oklahoma State	Gallagher-Iba Arena ● Stillwater, OK	**L 62**–112	0–2	
November 12, 2025	**Kansas City**	No. 6 Oklahoma	Lloyd Noble Center ● Norman, OK	**L 61**–89	0–3	
November 27, 2025	No. 12 North Carolina	**South Dakota State**†	Hard Rock Hotel Riviera Maya ● Cancún, MX	**L 48**–83	0–4	
December 9, 2025	**Omaha**	No. 24 Nebraska	Pinnacle Bank Arena ● Lincoln, NE	**L 35**–87	0–5	
December 21, 2025	No. 2 Texas	**South Dakota State**	First Bank and Trust Arena ● Brookings, SD	**L 51**–70	0–6	

Team rankings are reflective of AP poll

† denotes game was played at neutral site
^ denotes NCAA tournament game

=== Conference matrix ===
	Denver	Kansas City	North Dakota	North Dakota State	Omaha	Oral Roberts	St. Thomas	South Dakota	South Dakota State
vs. Denver	–	0–2	1–1	2–0	1–1	1–1	2–0	2–0	2–0
vs. Kansas City	2–0	–	1–1	2–0	0–2	2–0	1–1	2–0	2–0
vs. North Dakota	1–1	1–1	–	2–0	1–1	2–0	2–0	2–0	2–0
vs. North Dakota State	0–2	0–2	0–2	–	0–2	0–2	0–2	0–2	1–1
vs. Omaha	1–1	2–0	1–1	2–0	–	1–1	2–0	2–0	2–0
vs. Oral Roberts	1–1	0–2	0–2	2–0	1–1	–	1–1	1–1	2–0
vs. St. Thomas	0–2	1–1	0–2	2–0	0–2	1–1	–	2–0	2–0
vs. South Dakota	0–2	0–2	0–2	2–0	0–2	1–1	0–2	–	1–1
vs. South Dakota State	0–2	0–2	0–2	1–1	0–2	0–2	0–2	1–1	–
Total	5–11	4–12	3–12	15–1	3–13	8–8	8–8	12–4	14–2

Through February 28, 2026

=== Points scored ===
Team	For	Against	Difference
Denver	1766	1942	–176
Kansas City	1936	2031	–95
North Dakota	1786	2189	–403
North Dakota State	2334	1734	+600
Omaha	1698	2381	–683
Oral Roberts	2231	2176	+55
St. Thomas	1906	1787	+119
South Dakota	2130	1751	+379
South Dakota State	2314	1850	+464

Through February 28, 2026

=== National Television Games ===
Any games that league members will play on National Television, including the Summit League's media contract with CBS Sports Network, will be listed here.

Summit League members in bold

Date Time (CT)	Road Team	Home team	Final Score	Network
December 3, 2025; 7 PM	Montana State	**North Dakota State**	**W 90**–65	CBSSN
December 21, 2025; 1 PM	Texas	**South Dakota State**	**L 51**–70	CBSSN

=== Home attendance ===
Team	Arena	Capacity	Total Games	Average Attendance	Attendance High	Total Attendance	% of Capacity
Denver	Hamilton Gymnasium	2,500	15	477	1,026; Nov 21 vs. Regis	7,162	19.1%
Kansas City	Swinney Recreation Center	1,500	15	348	925; Nov 20 vs. Hesston	5,226	23.2%
North Dakota	Betty Engelstad Sioux Center	3,300	16	1,540	2,575; Nov 21 vs. Wyoming	24,646	46.7%
North Dakota State	Scheels Center	5,460	13	1,717	3,708; Feb 25 vs. South Dakota St	22,325	31.5%
Omaha	Baxter Arena	7,898	13	1,022	2,839; Dec 17 vs. Creighton	13,294	12.9%
Oral Roberts	Mabee Center	10,154	13	1,331	2,210; Dec 29 vs. Oklahoma Wesleyan	17,303	13.1%
St. Thomas	Lee and Penny Anderson Arena	5,300	17	480	984; Nov 8 vs. Army	8,172	9.1%
South Dakota	Sanford Coyote Sports Center	6,000	13	1,412	2,304; Feb 21 vs. North Dakota St	18,368	23.5%
South Dakota State	First Bank and Trust Arena	6,500	14	2,787	4,449; Feb 28 vs. South Dakota	39,022	42.9%

Bold - Exceed capacity
As of February 28, 2026
Does not include exhibition games or games played at alternate home facilities

== Head coaches ==
=== Coaching changes ===
==== North Dakota ====
On March 24, 2025, Mallory Bernhard stepped down as head coach at North Dakota after five seasons with the program. It was also announced the same day that associate head coach Dennis Hutter would become the Fighting Hawks next head coach.

==== Omaha ====
On April 22, 2025, Carrie Banks was let go from her position as head coach at Omaha after five seasons with the program. Then, on May 4, 2025, Jamie Carey was named the new head coach of the Mavericks.

==== Oral Roberts ====
On March 24, 2025, Kelsi Musick left Oral Roberts after three seasons to become the next head coach at Arkansas. Then, on March 31, 2025, associate head coach Cophie Anderson was named the next head coach of the Golden Eagles.

=== Coaches ===
Note: Stats shown are before the beginning of the season. Overall and Summit League records are from time at current school.

Team	Head coach	Previous job	Seasons at school	Overall record (Note: Overall and Summit League records, conference titles, etc. are from time at current school and are through the end the 2024–25 season.)	Summit record	Summit titles	NCAA tournaments (Note: NCAA tournament appearances are from time at current school only.)	NCAA Sweet Sixteen	NCAA Championships
Denver	Doshia Woods	Tulane (recruiting coordinator)	6th	46–97 (.322)	25–57 (.305)	0	0	0	0
Kansas City	Dionnah Jackson-Durrett	Texas (Associate head coach)	4th	33–74 (.308)	12–38 (.240)	0	0	0	0
North Dakota	Dennis Hutter	North Dakota (associate HC)	1st	0–0 (–)	0–0 (–)	0	0	0	0
North Dakota State	Jory Collins	Kansas (assistant)	7th	98–82 (.544)	59-41 (.590)	0	0	0	0
Omaha	Jamie Carey	UTSA (associate HC)	1st	0–0 (–)	0–0 (–)	0	0	0	0
Oral Roberts	Cophie Anderson	Oral Roberts (associate HC)	1st	0–0 (–)	0–0 (–)	0	0	0	0
St. Thomas	Ruth Sinn	Apple Valley HS	21st	407–156 (.723)	27–41 (.397) (Note: St. Thomas joined the Summit League in the summer of 2021.)	0	0	0	0
South Dakota	Carrie Eighmey	Idaho	2nd	11–20 (.355)	5–11 (.313)	0	0	0	0
South Dakota State	Aaron Johnston	South Dakota State (assistant)	26th	628–195 (.763)	260–34 (.884)	12	13	1	0

== Awards and honors ==
=== Players of the week ===
Throughout the regular season, the Summit League offices will name one or two players of the week each Monday.

Week	Player(s) of the Week	School
Nov. 11	Brooklyn Meyer	South Dakota State
Nov. 18	Brooklyn Meyer (2)	South Dakota State (2)
Nov. 25	Avery Koenen	North Dakota State
Dec. 2	Brooklyn Meyer (3)	South Dakota State (3)
Dec. 9	Brooklyn Meyer (4)	South Dakota State (4)
Dec. 16	Avery Koenen (2)	North Dakota State (2)
Dec. 23	Avery Koenen (3)	North Dakota State (3)
Dec. 30	Tierra Trotter	Kansas City
Jan. 6	Avery Koenen (4)	North Dakota State (4)
Jan. 13	Avery Koenen (5)	North Dakota State (5)
Jan. 20	Avery Koenen (6)	North Dakota State (6)
Jan. 27	Brooklyn Meyer (5)	South Dakota State (5)
Feb. 3	Angelina Robles	South Dakota
Feb. 10	Avery Koenen (7)	North Dakota State (7)
Feb. 17	Avery Koenen (8)	North Dakota State (8)
Feb. 24	Brooklyn Meyer (6)	South Dakota State (6)
Mar. 2	Brooklyn Meyer (7)	South Dakota State (7)

=== All–League Honors ===
The All–Summit League teams and individual awards were announced on March 3, ahead of the Summit League tournament.

2026 Summit League Women's Basketball Individual Awards
Award	Recipient(s)
Player of the Year	Avery Koenen – North Dakota State
Newcomer of the Year	Molly Joyce – South Dakota
Freshman of the Year	Karrington Asp – North Dakota State
Sixth Woman of the Year	Karrington Asp – North Dakota State
Defensive Player of the Year	Avery Koenen – North Dakota State
Coach of the Year	Jory Collins – North Dakota State

Honor	Recipient
All-Summit League First Team	Avery Koenen, North Dakota State
All-Summit League First Team	Madison Mathiowetz, South Dakota State
All-Summit League First Team	Brooklyn Meyer, South Dakota State
All-Summit League First Team	Angelina Robles, South Dakota
All-Summit League First Team	Alyssa Sand, St. Thomas
All-Summit League First Team	Coryn Watts, Denver
All-Summit League Second Team	Elauni Bennett, Kansas City
All-Summit League Second Team	Marisa Frost, North Dakota State
All-Summit League Second Team	Molly Joyce, South Dakota
All-Summit League Second Team	Jalei Oglesby, Oral Roberts
All-Summit League Second Team	Jocelyn Schiller, North Dakota State
All-Summit League Honorable Mention	Emani Bennett, Kansas City
All-Summit League Honorable Mention	Emilee Fox, South Dakota State
All-Summit League Honorable Mention	Mackenzie Hughes, North Dakota
All-Summit League Honorable Mention	Anna Trusty, Oral Roberts
All-Summit League Honorable Mention	Elise Turrubiates, South Dakota
All-Defensive Team	Ari Gordon, Oral Roberts
All-Defensive Team	Avery Koenen, North Dakota State
All-Defensive Team	Brooklyn Meyer, South Dakota State
All-Defensive Team	Alyssa Sand, St. Thomas
All-Defensive Team	Avril Smith, Omaha
All-Newcomer Team	Jada Hood, St. Thomas
All-Newcomer Team	Mackenzie Hughes, North Dakota
All-Newcomer Team	Molly Joyce, South Dakota
All-Newcomer Team	Anna Trusty, Oral Roberts
All-Newcomer Team	Elise Turrubiates, South Dakota
All-Freshman Team	Karrington Asp, North Dakota State
All-Freshman Team	Kayten Donley, Oral Roberts
All-Freshman Team	Regan Juenemann, Omaha
All-Freshman Team	Avril Smith, Omaha
All-Freshman Team	Hadley Thul, South Dakota State

== Postseason ==
=== Summit League tournament ===
All 9 teams qualified for the Summit League tournament. It was held at the Denny Sanford Premier Center in Sioux Falls, South Dakota from March 4 to March 8, 2026.

First Round; March 4 Summit League Network
8	Omaha	49
9	North Dakota	39

Quarterfinals; March 5 & 6 Summit League Network
1	North Dakota State	87
8	Omaha	37
4	Oral Roberts	54
5	St. Thomas	81
2	South Dakota State	75
7	Kansas City	61
3	South Dakota	61
6	Denver	50

Semifinals; March 7 Summit League Network
1	North Dakota State	63
5	St. Thomas	51
2	South Dakota State	74
3	South Dakota	59

Championship; March 8 CBS Sports Network
1	North Dakota State	51
2	South Dakota State	64

=== NCAA tournament ===
Only South Dakota State was selected to participate in the tournament as the conference's automatic bid.

Seed	Region	School	First round	Second round	Sweet Sixteen	Elite Eight	Final Four	Championship
No. 11	Sacramento Regional 4	South Dakota State	lost to No. 6 Washington	—	—	—	—	
	1 Bid	W-L (%):	0–1 (.000)	0–0 (–)	0–0 (–)	0–0 (–)	0–0 (–)	TOTAL: 0–1 (.000)

=== WBIT ===
North Dakota State was selected to participate in the tournament as an automatic bid, since they did not make the NCAA tournament as the Summit League's regular season champion.

Seed	Region	School	First round	Second round	Quarterfinal	Semifinal	Championship
No. 1	North Dakota State region	North Dakota State	defeated Chattanooga	lost to No. 4 Columbia	—	—	
1 Bid	W-L (%):	0–0 (–)	1–0 (1.000)	0–1 (.000)	0–0 (–)	0–0 (–)	TOTAL: 1–1 (.500)

=== WNIT ===
South Dakota was selected to participate in the tournament as an at-large bid.

School	First round	Second round	Super 16	Great 8	Fab Four	Championship
South Dakota	Bye	defeated Northern Colorado	defeated Pepperdine	defeated Montana State	lost to Illinois State	—
1 Bid W-L (%):	0–0 (–)	1–0 (1.000)	1–0 (1.000)	1–0 (1.000)	0–1 (.000)	TOTAL: 3–1 (.750)
