= 2025–26 St. Thomas (Minnesota) Tommies women's basketball team =

American college basketball season

2025–26 St. Thomas (Minnesota) Tommies women's basketball
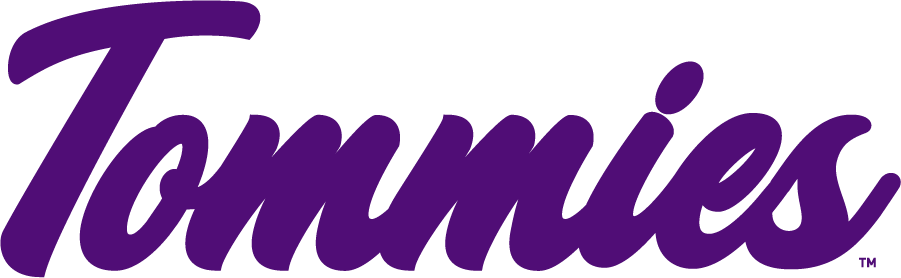
- Conference: Summit League
- Record: 16–16 (8–8 Summit)
- Head coach: Ruth Sinn (21st season)
- Assistant coaches: Madison McKeever; Tiana Jones; Park Shogren
- Home arena: Lee & Penny Anderson Arena

2025–26 Summit League women's basketball standings
	Conf.				Overall
Team	W		L	PCT	W		L	PCT
North Dakota State	15	–	1	.938	29	–	5	.853
South Dakota State †	14	–	2	.875	27	–	7	.794
South Dakota	12	–	4	.750	26	–	10	.722
Oral Roberts	8	–	8	.500	15	–	15	.500
St. Thomas	8	–	8	.500	16	–	16	.500
Denver	5	–	11	.313	11	–	19	.367
Kansas City	4	–	12	.250	7	–	23	.233
North Dakota	3	–	13	.188	7	–	24	.226
Omaha	3	–	13	.188	6	–	27	.182
† 2026 Summit League tournament winner

The 2025–26 St. Thomas Tommies women's basketball team represented the University of St. Thomas during the 2025–26 NCAA Division I women's basketball season. The Tommies, who were led by 21st-year head coach Ruth Sinn, played their home games at the newly opened Lee & Penny Anderson Arena in Saint Paul, Minnesota as members of the Summit League. Sinn announced on February 10, 2026 that she will be retiring after the season ended for the Tommies.

The Tommies finished the regular season 15–15, and 8–8 in the Summit League to finish in fifth place. In the Summit League tournament, St. Thomas defeated Oral Roberts in the quarterfinals, but lost to North Dakota State in the semifinals.

== Previous season ==
The Tommies finished the 2024–25 season 17–13, 9–7 in Summit League play, to finish in fourth place. They were defeated by North Dakota in the first round of the Summit League tournament.

== Roster ==
2025–26 St. Thomas (Minnesota) Tommies women's basketball team
Players
Coaches

Pos.	#	Name	Height	Year	Previous school	Hometown
G	2	Lizzie Steingraber	5 ft 9 in (1.75 m)	Jr	New London High School	New London, Wisconsin
G	3	Riley Wright	5 ft 11 in (1.8 m)	Sr	Northern Iowa	Marion, Iowa
G	4	Lydia Aalsma	5 ft 10 in (1.78 m)	Fr	Waupun High School	Waupun, Wisconsin
G	5	Faith Feuerbach	6 ft 0 in (1.83 m)	Sr	Sycamore High School	Sycamore, Illinois
G	10	Savannah Gage	5 ft 11 in (1.8 m)	Fr	Ankeny High School	Ankeny, Iowa
G	11	Jada Hood	5 ft 6 in (1.68 m)	GS	Christian Brothers	Saint Paul, Minnesota
G	12	Mikayla Werner	6 ft 0 in (1.83 m)	So	Hortonville High School	Hortonville, Wisconsin
F	14	Autumn McCall	6 ft 2 in (1.88 m)	Fr	Centennial High School	Blaine, Minnesota
F	15	Addison Schliewe	6 ft 2 in (1.88 m)	Fr	Sheboygan Falls High School	Sheboygan Falls, Wisconsin
G	22	Abbey Vallance	5 ft 8 in (1.73 m)	RS Fr	Tara Anglican School	Sydney, Australia
F	24	Alyssa Sand	6 ft 3 in (1.91 m)	So	Albany High School	Albany, Minnesota
G	30	Laura Hauge	5 ft 9 in (1.75 m)	So	St. Croix Lutheran Academy	West St. Paul, Minnesota
F	32	Savanah Gardner	5 ft 10 in (1.78 m)	So	Eastview High School	Apple Valley, Minnesota
G	33	Kammie Ludwig	5 ft 10 in (1.78 m)	Sr	Providence	Geneseo, Illinois
F	52	Savannah McGowan	6 ft 2 in (1.88 m)	Jr	Illinois State	Plymouth, Minnesota

Head coach

- Ruth Sinn (St. Thomas)

Assistant coach(es)

- Madison McKeever (South Dakota)
- Tiana Jones (Drexel)
- Park Shogren (Macalester)

Legend

- (C) Team captain
- (S) Suspended
- (I) Ineligible
- (W) Walk-on
- Injured
- Current redshirt

Roster
Last update: February 3, 2026

== Schedule and results ==
Date time, TV	Rank^{#}	Opponent^{#}	Result	Record	High points	High rebounds	High assists	Site (attendance) city, state
Non-conference regular season
November 3, 2025*; 11:00 am, ESPN+		at No. 14 Iowa State	L 36–85	0–1	17 – Sand	7 – Sand	1 – Tied	Hilton Coliseum (10,012); Ames, IA
November 8, 2025*; 2:00 pm, SLN/Fox 9+		Army	L 61–67	0–2	18 – McGowan	6 – Tied	7 – Hood	Lee & Penny Anderson Arena (984); St. Paul, MN
November 14, 2025*; 7:00 pm, SLN		Eastern Michigan	L 41–52	0–3	13 – Feuerbach	9 – Sand	1 – Tied	Lee & Penny Anderson Arena (370); St. Paul, MN
November 16, 2025*; 1:00 pm, SLN		NJIT	L 63–68	0–4	14 – McGowan	7 – Sand	4 – Hood	Lee & Penny Anderson Arena (389); St. Paul, MN
November 21, 2025*; 10:30 pm, GNACN		at Alaska Anchorage; Great Alaska Shootout semifinals	W 77−60	1−4	27 – Feuerbach	10 – Sand	4 – Tied	Alaska Airlines Center (2,025); Anchorage, AK
November 22, 2025*; 10:30 pm, GNACN		vs. UC Irvine; Great Alaska Shootout championship	L 55−63	1−5	22 – Sand	13 – McGowan	5 – Hood	Alaska Airlines Center (2,101); Anchorage, AK
November 26, 2025*; 1:00 pm, SLN		Oakland	L 52–68	1–6	12 – Tied	5 – Sand	4 – Sand	Lee & Penny Anderson Arena (263); St. Paul, MN
November 30, 2025*; 2:00 pm, SLN		UW–Stout	W 77–40	2–6	14 – Hauge	7 – Vallance	4 – Tied	Lee & Penny Anderson Arena (387); St. Paul, MN
December 3, 2025*; 11:00 am, SLN		Northern Arizona; Big Sky-Summit Challenge	W 74–66	3–6	22 – Feuerbach	12 – Sand	6 – Feuerbach	Lee & Penny Anderson Arena (558); St. Paul, MN
December 6, 2025*; 8:00 pm, ESPN+		at Montana; Big Sky–Summit Challenge	W 81–65	4–6	21 – Sand	11 – McGowan	7 – Hood	Dahlberg Arena (1,831); Missoula, MT
December 10, 2025*; 7:00 pm, SLN		Crown	W 112–23	5–6	14 – Tied	7 – Vallance	5 – Tied	Lee & Penny Anderson Arena (281); St. Paul, MN
December 13, 2025*; 1:00 pm, SLN		Drake	W 70−50	6−6	22 – Hood	8 – Hood	5 – Hood	Lee & Penny Anderson Arena (601); St. Paul, MN
December 21, 2025*; 2:00 pm, SLN		Northern Iowa	L 40–58	6–7	9 – Tied	7 – Tied	3 – Tied	Lee & Penny Anderson Arena (501); St. Paul, MN
December 29, 2025*; 2:00 pm, SLN		Northern Illinois	W 64–46	7–7	15 – Hood	9 – Sand	3 – Vallance	Lee & Penny Anderson Arena (318); St. Paul, MN
Summit League regular season
January 1, 2026; 2:00 pm, SLN		at South Dakota State	L 49–67	7–8 (0–1)	15 – Sand	12 – Sand	5 – Hood	First Bank and Trust Arena (3,092); Brookings, SD
January 8, 2026; 7:00 pm, SLN		Denver	W 74–65 ^{OT}	8–8 (1–1)	22 – Hood	10 – Werner	5 – Hood	Lee & Penny Anderson Arena (206); St. Paul, MN
January 10, 2026; 4:00 pm, SLN		South Dakota	L 65–72	8–9 (1–2)	13 – Hood	9 – Tied	7 – Hood	Schoenecker Arena (998); St. Paul, MN
January 15, 2026; 6:30 pm, SLN		at Omaha	W 81–68	9–9 (2–2)	17 – Feuerbach	9 – Sand	8 – Sand	Baxter Arena (794); Omaha, NE
January 17, 2026; 1:00 pm, SLN		at Kansas City	L 60–75	9–10 (2–3)	20 – Hauge	7 – Hood	5 – McCall	Swinney Recreation Center (304); Kansas City, MO
January 21, 2026; 7:00 pm, SLN		North Dakota State	L 66–75	9–11 (2–4)	20 – Sand	10 – Sand	4 – Vallance	Lee & Penny Anderson Arena (478); St. Paul, MN
January 24, 2026; 2:00 pm, SLN		North Dakota	W 72–54	10–11 (3–4)	16 – Werner	11 – Sand	3 – Tied	Lee & Penny Anderson Arena (654); St. Paul, MN
January 28, 2026; 7:00 pm, SLN		at South Dakota	L 55–67	10–12 (3–5)	12 – Sand	10 – Sand	3 – Hood	Sanford Coyote Sports Center (1,388); Vermillion, SD
February 4, 2026; 8:05 pm, Fox 9+/SLN		South Dakota State	L 51–84	10–13 (3–6)	12 – Sand	6 – McCall	2 – Tied (2)	Lee & Penny Anderson Arena (501); St. Paul, MN
February 7, 2026; 3:00 pm, SLN		at Denver	W 60–56	11–13 (4–6)	14 – Hood	13 – Sand	4 – Hood	Hamilton Gymnasium (440); Denver, CO
February 11, 2026; 7:00 pm, SLN		Oral Roberts	W 71–66	12–13 (5–6)	15 – Sand	15 – Sand	7 – Hood	Lee & Penny Anderson Arena (406); St. Paul, MN
February 14, 2026; 1:00 pm, SLN		Omaha	W 73–43	13–13 (6–6)	13 – Feuerbach	7 – Sand	4 – Sand	Lee & Penny Anderson Arena (551); St. Paul, MN
February 19, 2026; 7:00 pm, SLN		at North Dakota State	L 67–73	13–14 (7–6)	22 – Sand	7 – Sand	2 – Tied (2)	Scheels Center (959); Fargo, ND
February 21, 2026; 1:00 pm, SLN		at North Dakota	W 70–58	14–14 (8–6)	21 – Feuerbach	10 – Hood	6 – Hood	Betty Engelstad Sioux Center (1,519); Grand Forks, ND
February 25, 2026; 7:00 pm, SLN		Kansas City	W 73–71	15–14 (8–7)	23 – Sand	10 – Werner	6 – Hood	Lee & Penny Anderson Arena (705); St. Paul, MN
February 28, 2026; 2:00 pm, SLN		at Oral Roberts	L 52–67	15–15 (8–8)	19 – Sand	6 – Werner	1 – Tied (6)	Mabee Center (1,974); Tulsa, OK
Summit League tournament
March 6, 2026*; 12:00 pm, SLN	(5)	vs. (4) Oral Roberts; Quarterfinal	W 81–54	16–15	21 – Werner	10 – Sand	5 – Tied (2)	Denny Sanford Premier Center; Sioux Falls, SD
March 7, 2026*; 12:00 pm, SLN	(5)	vs. (1) North Dakota State; Semifinal	L 51–63	16–16	17 – Hood	7 – Sand	2 – Tied (2)	Denny Sanford Premier Center; Sioux Falls, SD
*Non-conference game. ^{#}Rankings from AP Poll. (#) Tournament seedings in parentheses. All times are in Central.
