= 2025–26 Oral Roberts Golden Eagles women's basketball team =

Women's basketball season

2025–26 Oral Roberts Golden Eagles women's basketball
- Conference: Summit League
- Record: 15–15 (8–8 Summit)
- Head coach: Cophie Anderson (1st season)
- Assistant coaches: Bill Annan; Wayne Anderson; Hayden Priddy; P'hariz Watkins
- Home arena: Mabee Center

2025–26 Summit League women's basketball standings
	Conf.				Overall
Team	W		L	PCT	W		L	PCT
North Dakota State	15	–	1	.938	29	–	5	.853
South Dakota State †	14	–	2	.875	27	–	7	.794
South Dakota	12	–	4	.750	26	–	10	.722
Oral Roberts	8	–	8	.500	15	–	15	.500
St. Thomas	8	–	8	.500	16	–	16	.500
Denver	5	–	11	.313	11	–	19	.367
Kansas City	4	–	12	.250	7	–	23	.233
North Dakota	3	–	13	.188	7	–	24	.226
Omaha	3	–	13	.188	6	–	27	.182
† 2026 Summit League tournament winner

The 2025–26 Oral Roberts Golden Eagles women's basketball team represented Oral Roberts University in the 2025–26 NCAA Division I women's basketball season. The Golden Eagles, who were led by first-year head coach Cophie Anderson, compete in the Summit League. They played home games at the Mabee Center in Tulsa, Oklahoma.

== Previous season ==
The Golden Eagles finished the 2024–25 season 24–9, 12–4 in Summit League play, to finish in second place. Oral Roberts entered the Summit League tournament as the number two seed, and they defeated South Dakota and Kansas City before falling to South Dakota State in the Championship Game. The Golden Eagles obtained an at-large bid to the 2025 Women's Basketball Invitation Tournament, and fell to Missouri State in first-round. On 21 March Kelsi Musick hired to Arkansas new head coach. On March 31, the assistant coach, Cophie Anderson, was appointed new head coach.

== Offseason ==
=== Departures ===
Name	Pos.	Height	Year	Hometown	Reason for departure
Makyra Tramble	F	5'10"	Graduate Student	Shawnee, OK	Completed college eligibility
Ruthie Udoumoh	G	6'1"	Graduate Student	Broken Arrow, OK	Completed college eligibility
Meghan Weinrich	G	5'10"	Graduate Student	Willows, CA	Completed college eligibility
Annyka Hellendrung	G	5'9"	Junior	Waukesha, WI	—
Mary Carden	C	6'6"	Sophomore	Idabel, OK	Transferred to Cincinnati
Tyla Heard	G/F	5'11"	Sophomore	Sapulpa, OK	Transferred to Oklahoma State
Taleyah Jones	G	5'10"	Senior	Broken Arrow, OK	Transferred to Arkansas
Alayna Kraus	G	5'8"	Sophomore	Okawville, IL	Transferred to Southern Illinois
Emily Robinson	F	5'10"	Junior	Bokchito, OK	Transferred to Arkansas

== Roster ==
2025–26 Oral Roberts Golden Eagles women's basketball team
Players
Coaches

Pos.	#	Name	Height	Year	Previous school	Hometown
G	0	Ari Gordon	5 ft 11 in (1.8 m)	RS Jr	Seward County CC	Maple Grove, MN
G	1	Azailah Funches	6 ft 1 in (1.85 m)	So	Shawnee Mission South HS	Leawood, KS
G	2	Gentry Baldwin	5 ft 5 in (1.65 m)	Jr	Bixby HS	Bixby, OK
G	3	Anna Trusty	6 ft 0 in (1.83 m)	So	Arkansas–Fort Smith	Greenwood, AR
G	10	Preslee Hartsock	5 ft 8 in (1.73 m)	Fr	Community Christian School	Norman, OK
G	11	Jalei Ogelsby	5 ft 8 in (1.73 m)	RS Sr	Arkansas Tech	Howe, OK
F	14	Hannah Coons	6 ft 1 in (1.85 m)	RS Fr	South Dakota	Kiefer, OK
G/F	15	Alana Shetlar	6 ft 3 in (1.91 m)	RS Fr	Andover HS	Andover, KS
G	20	Bella Edwards	5 ft 11 in (1.8 m)	Fr	Amarillo HS	Amarillo, TX
F	22	A'Maya Holton	6 ft 0 in (1.83 m)	Fr	East Central HS	San Antonio, TX
F	30	Kayten Donley	6 ft 1 in (1.85 m)	Fr	Bethany HS	Bethany, OK
F/C	32	Taylor Jackson	6 ft 3 in (1.91 m)	GS	Friends	Houston, TX

Head coach

- Cophie Anderson (Fresno State)

Assistant coach(es)

- Bill Annan (Kansas State)
- Wayne Anderson (Central Oklahoma)
- Hayden Priddy (Southwestern Oklahoma State)
- P'Hariz Watkins (Adrian College)

Legend

- (C) Team captain
- (S) Suspended
- (I) Ineligible
- (W) Walk-on
- Injured
- Current redshirt

Roster
Last update: December 24, 2025

== Schedule and results ==
Date time, TV	Rank^{#}	Opponent^{#}	Result	Record	High points	High rebounds	High assists	Site (attendance) city, state
Exhibition
October 25, 2025*; 2:00 p.m.		USAO	W 95–61	–	–	–	–	Mabee Center; Tulsa, OK
Non-conference regular season
November 3, 2025*; 11:00 a.m., SLN		Friends	W 97–65	1–0	26 – Holton	11 – Holton	3 – Tied	Mabee Center; Tulsa, OK
November 6, 2025*; 5:00 p.m., KGEB		Haskell	W 92–50	2–0	23 – Oglesby	9 – Tied	3 – Baldwin	Mabee Center (1,267); Tulsa, OK
November 9, 2025*; 5:00 p.m., ESPN+		at No. 22 Oklahoma State	L 62–112	2–1	24 – Oglesby	5 – Oglesby	2 – Gordon	Gallagher-Iba Arena (7,501); Stillwater, OK
November 13, 2025*; 6:00 p.m., ESPN+		at Lindenwood	L 65–76	2–2	18 – Oglesby	6 – Oglesby	6 – Baldwin	Robert F. Hyland Arena (536); St. Charles, MO
November 17, 2025*; 7:00 p.m., KGEB		Tulsa; Rivalry	L 69–78	2–3	21 – Baldwin	4 – Trusty	5 – Donley	Mabee Center (1,670); Tulsa, OK
November 19, 2025*; 7:00 p.m., B1G+		Nebraska	L 58–103	2–4	14 – Oglesby	5 – Tied	3 – Oglesby	Pinnacle Bank Arena (4,312); Lincoln, NE
November 23, 2025*; 2:00 p.m., ESPN+		at Kansas	L 75–86	2–5	26 – Trusty	10 – Oglesby	3 – Tied	Allen Fieldhouse (3,646); Lawrence, KS
November 26, 2025*; 1:00 p.m., KGEB		Texas A&M–Corpus Christi	W 89–74	3–5	17 – Baldwin	6 – Trusty	5 – Donley	Mabee Center (967); Tulsa, OK
December 3, 2025*; 1:00 p.m., ESPN+		Idaho; Big Sky–Summit Challenge	W 92–89	4–5	24 – Trusty	5 – Tied	6 – Baldwin	ICCU Arena (1,889); Moscow, ID
December 6, 2025*; 2:00 p.m., KGEB		Idaho State; Big Sky–Summit Challenge	W 68–58	5–5	16 – Oglesby	7 – Funches	5 – Oglesby	Mabee Center (1,521); Tulsa, OK
December 16, 2025*; 11:00 a.m., ESPN+		at Wichita State	L 65–79	5–6	23 – Trusty	6 – Oglesby	2 – Tied	Charles Koch Arena (4,118); Wichita, KS
December 18, 2025*; 6:00 p.m., ESPN+		North Texas	W 74–73	6–6	17 – Tied	8 – Donley	2 – Tied	Super Pit (1,231); Denton, TX
December 29, 2025*; 7:00 p.m., KGEB		Oklahoma Wesleyan	W 86–51	7–6	25 – Oglesby	15 – Oglesby	6 – Gordon	Mabee Center (2,210); Tulsa, OK
Summit League regular season
January 1, 2026; 7:00 p.m., SLN		North Dakota State	L 68–76	7–7 (0–1)	20 – Oglesby	7 – Oglesby	4 – Baldwin	Mabee Center (2,178); Tulsa, OK
January 3, 2026; 2:00 p.m., SLN		North Dakota	W 95–67	8–7 (1–1)	20 – Trusty	7 – Funches	8 – Baldwin	Mabee Center (993); Tulsa, OK
January 8, 2026; 7:00 p.m., SLN		at South Dakota	W 83–61	9–7 (2–1)	18 – Tied	9 – Funches	5 – Baldwin	Sanford Coyote Sports Center (1,107); Vermillion, SD
January 10, 2026; 1:00 p.m., SLN		at South Dakota State	L 76–103	9–8 (2–2)	14 – Baldwin	6 – Hartsock	5 – Donley	First Bank and Trust Arena (2,452); Brookings, SD
January 15, 2026; 7:00 p.m., SLN		Kansas City	W 81–65	10–8 (3–2)	21 – Oglesby	7 – Trusty	6 – Donley	Mabee Center (791); Tulsa, OK
January 17, 2026; 2:00 p.m., SLN		Omaha	W 85–52	11–8 (4–2)	16 – Trusty	10 – Trusty	7 – Donley	Mabee Center (747); Tulsa, OK
January 24, 2026; 12:00 p.m., SLN		at Denver	L 74–86	11–9 (4–3)	18 – Oglesby	6 – Donley	2 – Baldwin	Hamilton Gymnasium (449); Denver, CO
January 29, 2026; 7:00 p.m., SLN		at North Dakota	W 89–80	12–9 (5–3)	25 – Baldwin	8 – Oglesby	5 – Tied	Betty Engelstad Sioux Center (1,488); Grand Forks, ND
January 31, 2026; 1:00 p.m., SLN		at North Dakota State	L 72–93	12–10 (5–4)	14 – Oglesby	7 – Donley	1 – Tied	Scheels Center (1,688); Fargo, ND
February 7, 2026; 2:00 p.m., SLN		South Dakota	L 69–74	12–11 (5–5)	16 – Donley	7 – Trusty	2 – Tied	Mabee Center (537); Tulsa, OK
February 11, 2026; 7:00 p.m., SLN		at St. Thomas	L 66–71	12–12 (5–6)	17 – Oglesby	5 – Donley	3 – Tied	Lee & Penny Anderson Arena (406); Saint Paul, MN
February 14, 2026; 2:00 p.m., SLN		Denver	W 76–55	13–12 (6–6)	23 – Donley	7 – Donley	4 – Trusty	Mabee Center (1,174); Tulsa, OK
February 19, 2026; 7:00 p.m., SLN		South Dakota State	L 93–95	13–13 (6–7)	19 – Oglesby	6 – Donley	2 – Tied	Mabee Center (1,274); Tulsa, OK
February 21, 2026; 2:00 p.m., SLN		at Kansas City	W 70–68	14–13 (7–7)	20 – Gordon	7 – Donley	3 – Hartsock	Swinney Center (478); Kansas City, MO
February 25, 2026; 7:00 p.m., SLN		Omaha	L 75–84	14–14 (7–8)	23 – Oglesby	9 – Donley	3 – Tied	Baxter Arena (548); Omaha, NE
February 28, 2026; 2:00 p.m., SLN		St. Thomas	W 67–52	15–14 (8–8)	15 – Oglesby	15 – Donley	5 – Donley	Mabee Center (1,974); Tulsa, OK
Summit League tournament
March 6, 2026*; 12:00 pm, SLN	(4)	vs. (5) St. Thomas; Quarterfinal	L 54–81	15–15	18 – Oglesby	7 – Donley	3 – Baldwin	Denny Sanford Premier Center; Sioux Falls, SD
*Non-conference game. ^{#}Rankings from AP poll. (#) Tournament seedings in parentheses. All times are in Central.
