= 2025–26 South Dakota State Jackrabbits women's basketball team =

Intercollegiate basketball season

2025–26 South Dakota State Jackrabbits women's basketball

Summit League tournament champions

NCAA tournament, First Round
- Conference: Summit League
- Record: 27–7 (14–2 Summit)
- Head coach: Aaron Johnston (26th full, 27th overall season)
- Associate head coach: Sadie Thramer (5th year)
- Assistant coaches: Macy Stanage (2nd season); Kacie Jones (2nd season); Shelby Selland (5th season); Erika Sage (5th season)
- Home arena: First Bank and Trust Arena

2025–26 Summit League women's basketball standings
	Conf.				Overall
Team	W		L	PCT	W		L	PCT
North Dakota State	15	–	1	.938	29	–	5	.853
South Dakota State †	14	–	2	.875	27	–	7	.794
South Dakota	12	–	4	.750	26	–	10	.722
Oral Roberts	8	–	8	.500	15	–	15	.500
St. Thomas	8	–	8	.500	16	–	16	.500
Denver	5	–	11	.313	11	–	19	.367
Kansas City	4	–	12	.250	7	–	23	.233
North Dakota	3	–	13	.188	7	–	24	.226
Omaha	3	–	13	.188	6	–	27	.182
† 2026 Summit League tournament winner

The 2025–26 South Dakota State Jackrabbits women's basketball represented South Dakota State University in the 2025–26 NCAA Division I women's basketball season. The Jackrabbits were led by twenty-sixth-year head coach Aaron Johnston, and competed in the Summit League. They played their home games in First Bank and Trust Arena in Brookings, South Dakota.

== Previous season ==
=== Departures ===
Name	Number	Pos.	Height	Year	Hometown	Reason for departure
Paige Meyer	21	G	5'6"	Senior	Albany, Minnesota	Graduated
Madysen Vlastuin	22	F	6'1"	Senior	Lennox, South Dakota	Graduated
Mesa Byom	24	F	6'2"	Senior	Melrose, Wisconsin	Graduated
Kallie Theisen	12	F	6'1"	RS senior	Plymouth, Minnesota	Graduated
Jenna Hopp	2	G	5'1"	Sophomore	Glenwood, Iowa	Transferred to South Dakota

=== 2025 recruiting class ===
College recruiting
Name	Hometown	School	Height	Weight	Commit date
Brooklynn Felchle; C	Bismarck, North Dakota	Legacy High School	6 ft 3 in (1.91 m)	N/A	Aug 28, 2023
Brooklynn Felchle; C	Recruit ratings: Scout: Rivals: 247Sports: ESPN: (0)				
Abby Hoselton; F	St. Michael, MN	St. Michael-Albertville High School	5 ft 11 in (1.80 m)	N/A	Apr 2, 2024
Abby Hoselton; F	Recruit ratings: Scout: Rivals: 247Sports: ESPN: (0)				
Hadley Thul; G	Alexandria, MN	Alexandria Area High School	6 ft 2 in (1.88 m)	N/A	Jul 11, 2024
Hadley Thul; G	Recruit ratings: Scout: Rivals: 247Sports: ESPN: (0)				
Overall recruit ranking:
Note: In many cases, Scout, Rivals, 247Sports, On3, and ESPN may conflict in their listings of height and weight.; In these cases, the average was taken. ESPN grades are on a 100-point scale.; Sources: "2025 Team Ranking". Rivals.

== Roster ==
2025–26 South Dakota State Jackrabbits women's basketball team
Players
Coaches

Pos.	#	Name	Height	Year	Previous school	Hometown
G	3	Madison Mathiowetz	5 ft 10 in (1.78 m)	Sr	St. Mary's High School	Sleepy Eye, MN
G	4	Emilee Fox	5 ft 8 in (1.73 m)	So	Mount Vernon High School	Mount Vernon SD
G	5	Ellie Colbeck	5 ft 10 in (1.78 m)	Sr	Kennedy Secondary School	Fergus Falls, MN
G	10	Hilary Behrens	6 ft 0 in (1.83 m)	RS So	Brandon Valley High School	Brandon, SD
G	11	Hadley Thul	6 ft 2 in (1.88 m)	Fr	Alexandria Area High School	Alexandria, MN
G	15	Mahli Abdouch	5 ft 7 in (1.7 m)	RS Fr	O'Gorman Catholic High School	Sioux Falls, SD
G	23	Katie Vasecka	6 ft 2 in (1.88 m)	So	Tea Area High School	Tea, SD
F	24	Maggie Hartwig	6 ft 1 in (1.85 m)	Jr	Sauk Prairie High School Evansville	Sauk City, WI
F	25	Abby Hoselton	5 ft 11 in (1.8 m)	Fr	St. Michael-Albertville High School	St. Michael, MN
F	31	Brooklyn Meyer	6 ft 2 in (1.88 m)	Sr	West Lyon Community School	Larchwood, IA
G/F	32	Claire Sheppard	6 ft 1 in (1.85 m)	RS Fr	Flandreau High School	Egan, SD
C	34	Brooklynn Felchle	6 ft 3 in (1.91 m)	Fr	Legacy High School	Bismarck, ND
F	45	Jaidyn Dunn	6 ft 1 in (1.85 m)	RS Fr	Thomas Jefferson High School	Sioux Falls, SD

Head coach

- Aaron Johnston (Gustavus Adolphus)

Assistant coach(es)

- Sadie Thramer (Wayne State (NE))
- Macy Stanage (South Dakota State)
- Kacie Jones (Wayne State (NE))
- Shelby Selland (South Dakota State)
- Erika Sage (Northwestern College (IA))

Legend

- (C) Team captain
- (S) Suspended
- (I) Ineligible
- (W) Walk-on
- Injured
- Current redshirt

Roster

== Schedule ==
Date time, TV	Rank^{#}	Opponent^{#}	Result	Record	Site (attendance) city, state
Regular season
October 29, 2025*; 6:00 pm		Augustana; Exhibition	W 90–54	–	First Bank and Trust Arena; Brookings, SD
November 3, 2025*; 6:00 pm, ESPN+		at Creighton	W 78–62	1–0	D. J. Sokol Arena (1,489); Omaha, NE
November 7, 2025*; 7:00 pm, Midco Sports 2/Summit League Network		Rice	W 79–65	2–0	First Bank and Trust Arena (2,151); Brookings, SD
November 11, 2025*; 7:00 pm, Midco Sports		Murray State	W 91–60	3–0	First Bank and Trust Arena (2,011); Brookings, SD
November 15, 2025*; 7:00 pm, SLN		vs. Montana	W 95–71	4–0	The Monument (2,639); Rapid City, SD
November 20, 2025*; 7:00 pm, Midco Sports		vs. Gonzaga	W 72–63	5–0	Sanford Pentagon (2,136); Sioux Falls, SD
November 27, 2025*; 10:00 am, FloCollege		vs. No. 12 North Carolina; Cancún Challenge Mayan Tournament	L 48–83	5–1	Hard Rock Hotel Riviera Maya; Cancún, Mexico
November 28, 2025*; 12:30 pm, FloCollege		vs. Columbia; Cancún Challenge Mayan Tournament	L 67–80	5–2	Hard Rock Hotel Riviera Maya; Cancún, Mexico
November 29, 2025*; 10:00 am, FloCollege		vs. Kansas State; Cancún Challenge Mayan Tournament	W 82–70	6–2	Hard Rock Hotel Riviera Maya (230); Cancún, Mexico
December 3, 2025*; 7:00 pm, SLN		Weber State; Big Sky–Summit Challenge	W 87–56	7–2	First Bank and Trust Arena (1,801); Brookings, SD
December 6, 2025*; 3:00 pm		at Northern Arizona; Big Sky–Summit Challenge	W 88–72	8–2	Walkup Skydome (238); Flagstaff, AZ
December 10, 2025*; 6:00 pm		at Northern Iowa	W 59–57	9–2	McLeod Center (2,384); Cedar Falls, IA
December 14, 2025*; 2:00 pm, Midco Sports 2/SLN		Ball State	W 78–59	10–2	First Bank and Trust Arena (1,767); Brookings, SD
December 18, 2025*; 6:00 pm, ACCN		at Duke	L 54–97	10–3	Cameron Indoor Stadium (2,493); Durham, NC
December 21, 2025*; 1:00 pm, CBSSN		No. 2 Texas	L 51–70	10–4	First Bank and Trust Arena (3,878); Brookings, SD
Summit League regular season
January 1, 2026; 2:00 pm, Midco Sports/SLN		St. Thomas	W 67–49	11–4 (1–0)	First Bank and Trust Arena (3,092); Brookings, SD
January 3, 2026; 4:00 pm, SLN		at Omaha	W 65–36	12–4 (2–0)	Baxter Arena (3,324); Omaha, NE
January 10, 2026; 7:00 pm, SLN		Oral Roberts	W 103–76	13–4 (3–0)	First Bank and Trust Arena (2,452); Brookings, SD
January 15, 2026; 7:00 pm, SLN		Denver	W 90–44	14–4 (4–0)	First Bank and Trust Arena (2,480); Brookings, SD
January 17, 2026; 2:00 pm, Midco Sports 2/SLN		North Dakota State	L 68–76	14–5 (4–1)	First Bank and Trust Arena (4,138); Brookings, SD
January 21, 2026; 7:00 pm, SLN		at North Dakota	W 99–47	15–5 (5–1)	Betty Engelstad Sioux Center (1,531); Grand Forks, ND
January 24, 2026; 2:00 pm, SLN		at Kansas City	W 76–63	16–5 (6–1)	Swinney Recreation Center (224); Kansas City, MO
January 28, 2026; 7:00 pm, Midco Sports/SLN		Omaha	W 85–41	17–5 (7–1)	First Bank and Trust Arena (2,389); Brookings, SD
January 31, 2026; 1:00 pm, Midco Sports 2/SLN		at South Dakota	L 54–73	17–6 (7–2)	Sanford Coyote Sports Center (3,060); Vermillion, SD
February 4, 2026; 8:00 pm, SLN		at St. Thomas	W 84–51	18–6 (8–2)	First Bank and Trust Arena (501); Brookings, SD
February 12, 2026; 7:00 pm, Midco Sports/SLN		North Dakota	W 94–48	19–6 (9–2)	First Bank and Trust Arena (2,457); Brookings, SD
February 14, 2026; 2:00 pm, SLN		Kansas City	W 93–40	20–6 (10–2)	First Bank and Trust Arena (2,897); Brookings, SD
February 19, 2026; 7:00 pm, SLN		at Oral Roberts	W 95–93	21–6 (11–2)	Mabee Center; Tulsa, OK
February 21, 2026; 2:00 pm, SLN		at Denver	W 71–55	22–6 (12–2)	Hamilton Gymnasium; Denver, CO
February 25, 2026; 7:00 pm, SLN		at North Dakota State	W 59–44	23–6 (13–2)	Scheels Center; Fargo, ND
February 28, 2026; 6:00 pm, Midco Sports 2/SLN		South Dakota	W 82–49	24–6 (14–2)	First Bank and Trust Arena (4,449); Brookings, SD
Summit League tournament
March 5, 2026*; 12:00 pm, SLN	(2)	vs. (7) Kansas City; Quarterfinal	W 75–61	25–6	Denny Sanford Premier Center (6,176); Sioux Falls, SD
March 7, 2026*; 2:35 pm, SLN	(2)	vs. (3) South Dakota; Semifinal	W 74–59	26–6	Denny Sanford Premier Center (8,476); Sioux Falls, SD
March 8, 2026*; 3:15 pm, CBSSN	(2)	vs. (1) North Dakota State; Championship	W 64–51	27–6	Denny Sanford Premier Center (7,930); Sioux Falls, SD
NCAA tournament
March 20, 2026*; 1:30 pm, ESPNews	(11 S4)	vs. (6 S4) Washington; First round	L 54–72	27–7	Schollmaier Arena (3,934); Fort Worth, TX
*Non-conference game. ^{#}Rankings from AP Poll. (#) Tournament seedings in parentheses. S4=Sacramento 4. All times are in Central Time Zone.

== Rankings ==
Ranking movements Legend: ██ Increase in ranking ██ Decrease in ranking — = Not ranked RV = Received votes
	Week																				
Poll	Pre	1	2	3	4	5	6	7	8	9	10	11	12	13	14	15	16	17	18	19	Final
AP	RV	RV	RV	RV	—	—	—	—	—*	—	—	—	—	—	—	—	—	—	RV	RV	
Coaches	RV	RV	RV	RV	RV	RV	RV	RV	RV	—	RV	RV	—	—	—	—	—	—	RV	RV	

*AP did not release a week 8 poll.
