= 2025–26 Omaha Mavericks women's basketball team =

American college basketball season

2025–26 Omaha Mavericks women's basketball
- Conference: Summit League
- Record: 6–27 (3–13 Summit)
- Head coach: Jamie Carey (1st season)
- Assistant coaches: Leah Szabla; Claire Gritt; Madi Townley; Dan Levine
- Home arena: Baxter Arena

2025–26 Summit League women's basketball standings
	Conf.				Overall
Team	W		L	PCT	W		L	PCT
North Dakota State	15	–	1	.938	29	–	5	.853
South Dakota State †	14	–	2	.875	27	–	7	.794
South Dakota	12	–	4	.750	26	–	10	.722
Oral Roberts	8	–	8	.500	15	–	15	.500
St. Thomas	8	–	8	.500	16	–	16	.500
Denver	5	–	11	.313	11	–	19	.367
Kansas City	4	–	12	.250	7	–	23	.233
North Dakota	3	–	13	.188	7	–	24	.226
Omaha	3	–	13	.188	6	–	27	.182
† 2026 Summit League tournament winner

The 2025–26 Omaha Mavericks women's basketball team represented the University of Nebraska Omaha during the 2025–26 NCAA Division I women's basketball season. The Mavericks, who were led by first-year head coach Jamie Carey, played their home games at Baxter Arena in Omaha, Nebraska as members of the Summit League.

The Mavericks finished the regular season 5–26 overall, and 3–13 in the Summit League to finish in eighth place. In the Summit League tournament, they defeated North Dakota in the first round, but lost to North Dakota State in the quarterfinals.

== Previous season ==
The Mavericks finished the 2024–25 season 14–17, 5–11 in Summit League play, to finish in a tie for seventh place. They defeated Denver, before falling to top-seeded and eventual tournament champions South Dakota State in the quarterfinals of the Summit League tournament.

On April 22, 2025, it was announced that the school would be firing head coach Carrie Banks, ending her five-year tenure with the team. On May 4, the school announced that they would be hiring UTSA assistant coach Jamie Carey as the team's new head coach.

== Roster ==
2025–26 Omaha Mavericks women's basketball team
Players
Coaches

Pos.	#	Name	Height	Year	Previous school	Hometown
F	0	Mina Milosevic	6 ft 1 in (1.85 m)	So	Bellarmine	Belgrade, Serbia
G	1	Tannika Leger-Walker	5 ft 9 in (1.75 m)	Fr	St Peter's School, Cambridge	Hamilton, New Zealand
G	2	Leekaya Burke Perryman	5 ft 3 in (1.6 m)	Fr	Pine Creek High School	Colorado Springs, Colorado
G	4	Daria Shelby	5 ft 8 in (1.73 m)	So	Belleville High School	Canton, Michigan
G	5	Sarai Estupiñan	5 ft 5 in (1.65 m)	GS	Old Dominion	Cedar Park, Texas
G	7	Esra Kurban	5 ft 8 in (1.73 m)	Fr	Okyanus	Istanbul, Turkey
G	10	Reilly Palmer	5 ft 9 in (1.75 m)	Sr	College of Saint Mary	Omaha, Nebraska
F	11	Ali Stephens	5 ft 11 in (1.8 m)	Jr	Homestead High School	Fort Wayne, Indiana
G	12	Elsa Vedral	5 ft 10 in (1.78 m)	Fr	Marian High School	Omaha, Nebraska
F	14	Avril Smith	6 ft 0 in (1.83 m)	Fr	Millard North High School	Omaha, Nebraska
F	20	Aduke Ojullu	6 ft 1 in (1.85 m)	Fr	Lakeville North High School	Lakeville, Minnesota
G	21	Olivia Borsutzki	5 ft 11 in (1.8 m)	Jr	Xavier	Munich, Germany
F	22	Cora Olsen	5 ft 9 in (1.75 m)	Jr	Millard South High School	Omaha, Nebraska
F	23	Erikka Gooden	5 ft 11 in (1.8 m)	Fr	Northside High School	Fort Smith, Arkansas
G	24	Regan Juenemann	5 ft 9 in (1.75 m)	Fr	Crosby-Ironton High School	Crosby, Minnesota
F	25	Lainey Maehl	5 ft 11 in (1.8 m)	Jr	Iowa Central Community College	Fort Dodge, Iowa
C	33	Lillian Merow	6 ft 2 in (1.88 m)	Fr	Port Washington High School	Port Washington, Wisconsin

Head coach

- Jamie Carey (Texas)

Assistant coach(es)

- Leah Szabla (North Dakota)
- Claire Gritt (Denver)
- Madi Townley (North Texas)
- Dan Levine (Michigan)

Legend

- (C) Team captain
- (S) Suspended
- (I) Ineligible
- (W) Walk-on
- Injured
- Current redshirt

Roster
Last update: February 5, 2026

== Schedule and results ==
Date time, TV	Rank^{#}	Opponent^{#}	Result	Record	High points	High rebounds	High assists	Site (attendance) city, state
Exhibition
October 26, 2025*; 3:30 pm		Avila	W 81–55	–	17 – Stephens	11 – Smith	5 – Estupiñan	Sapp Fieldhouse (467); Omaha, NE
Non-conference regular season
November 3, 2025*; 9:00 pm, ESPN+		at Kansas State	L 35–100	0–1	7 – Olsen	7 – Merow	3 – Estupiñan	Bramlage Coliseum (3,207); Manhattan, KS
November 6, 2025*; 6:30 pm, SLN		Saint Mary (NE)	W 88–47	1–1	25 – Olsen	21 – Smith	5 – Smith	Sapp Fieldhouse (728); Omaha, NE
November 12, 2025*; 8:00 pm, ESPN+		at Utah Tech	L 56–62	1–2	23 – Olsen	14 – Smith	4 – Smith	Burns Arena (552); St. George, UT
November 13, 2025*; 8:00 pm, ESPN+		at BYU	L 47–104	1–3	10 – Tied	6 – Merow	1 – Tied	Marriott Center (2,058); Provo, UT
November 15, 2025*; 12:00 pm, MWN		at Utah State	L 69−77	1−4	26 – Estupiñan	9 – Smith	6 – Estupiñan	Smith Spectrum (1,554); Logan, UT
November 20, 2025*; 6:30 pm, SLN		Cal State Bakersfield	L 73−82	1−5	23 – Olsen	13 – Smith	5 – Estupiñan	Baxter Arena (508); Omaha, NE
November 22, 2025*; 1:00 pm, SLN		Lindenwood	L 41–85	1–6	9 – Vedral	10 – Merow	4 – Estupiñan	Baxter Arena (695); Omaha, NE
December 3, 2025*; 8:00 pm, ESPN+		at Idaho State; Big Sky–Summit League Challenge	L 43–74	1–7	11 – Juenemann	8 – Tied	3 – Juenemann	Reed Gym (762); Pocatello, ID
December 6, 2025*; 1:00 pm, SLN		Northern Colorado; Big Sky–Summit League Challenge	L 60–71	1–8	23 – Estupiñan	7 – Stephens	5 – Estupiñan	Baxter Arena (693); Omaha, NE
December 9, 2025*; 7:00 pm, ESPN+		at Nebraska	L 35–87	1–9	10 – Estupiñan	11 – Smith	2 – Tied	Pinnacle Bank Arena (4,318); Lincoln, NE
December 13, 2025*; 1:00 pm, ESPN+		at Western Illinois	L 41–90	1–10	15 – Estupiñan	11 – Smith	3 – Burke Perryman	Western Hall (164); Macomb, IL
December 17, 2025*; 6:30 pm, SLN		Creighton	L 48−92	1−11	13 – Vedral	12 – Smith	5 – Estupiñan	Baxter Arena (2,839); Omaha, NE
December 20, 2025*; 3:00 pm		vs. Southern Utah; LMU Tournament	L 47–80	1–12	15 – Juenemann	9 – Smith	2 – Tied	Gersten Pavilion (102); Los Angeles, CA
December 21, 2025*; 2:00 pm		vs. Weber State; LMU Tournament	L 61–74	1–13	17 – Estupiñan	14 – Smith	4 – Burke Perryman	Gersten Pavilion; Los Angeles, CA
December 27, 2025*; 1:00 pm, SLN		Briar Cliff	W 90–81	2–13	35 – Estupiñan	21 – Smith	7 – Estupiñan	Baxter Arena (1,057); Omaha, NE
Summit League regular season
December 31, 2025; 5:00 pm, SLN		at Kansas City	L 59–61	2–14 (0–1)	27 – Juenemann	10 – Smith	9 – Estupiñan	Swinney Recreation Center (269); Kansas City, MO
January 3, 2026; 4:00 pm, SLN		South Dakota State	L 36–65	2–15 (0–2)	10 – Shelby	7 – Stephens	2 – Estupiñan	Baxter Arena (3,324); Omaha, NE
January 8, 2026; 7:00 pm, SLN		at North Dakota	L 54–75	2–16 (0–3)	15 – Stephens	8 – Smith	7 – Estupiñan	Betty Engelstad Sioux Center (1,386); Grand Forks, ND
January 10, 2026; 1:00 pm, SLN		at North Dakota State	L 39–94	2–17 (0–4)	15 – Juenemann	15 – Smith	2 – Smith	Scheels Center (1,274); Fargo, ND
January 15, 2026; 6:30 pm, SLN		St. Thomas	L 68–81	2–18 (0–5)	18 – Stephens	10 – Smith	4 – Tied	Baxter Arena (794); Omaha, NE
January 17, 2026; 2:00 pm, SLN		at Oral Roberts	L 52–85	2–19 (0–6)	16 – Stephens	16 – Smith	5 – Estupiñan	Mabee Center (747); Tulsa, OK
January 22, 2026; 6:30 pm, SLN		South Dakota	L 39–67	2–20 (0–7)	12 – Burke Perryman	15 – Smith	2 – Tied	Baxter Arena (1,334); Omaha, NE
January 28, 2026; 7:00 pm, SLN		at South Dakota State	L 41–85	2–21 (0–8)	10 – Juenemann	6 – Smith	3 – Estupiñan	First Bank and Trust Arena (2,389); Brookings, SD
January 31, 2026; 1:00 pm, SLN		Kansas City	L 59–60	2–22 (0–9)	27 – Juenemann	17 – Smith	8 – Burke Perryman	Baxter Arena (1,221); Omaha, NE
February 5, 2026; 6:30 pm, SLN		North Dakota	W 58–54	3–22 (1–9)	15 – Smith	20 – Smith	3 – Burke Perryman	Baxter Arena (679); Omaha, NE
February 7, 2026; 1:00 pm, SLN		North Dakota State	L 51–102	3–23 (1–10)	14 – Juenemann	5 – Smith	3 – Vedral	Baxter Arena (1,062); Omaha, NE
February 11, 2026; 7:00 pm, SLN		at Denver	W 65–58	4–23 (2–10)	24 – Estupiñan	14 – Smith	3 – Tied (2)	Hamilton Gymnasium (369); Denver, CO
February 14, 2026; 1:00 pm, SLN		at St. Thomas	L 43–73	4–24 (2–11)	13 – Juenemann	8 – Smith	1 – Tied (5)	Lee & Penny Anderson Arena (551); St. Paul, MN
February 19, 2026; 7:00 pm, SLN		at South Dakota	L 66–69	4–25 (2–12)	24 – Estupiñan	8 – Stephens	5 – Smith	Sanford Coyote Sports Center (1,189); Vermillion, SD
February 25, 2026; 6:30 pm, SLN		Oral Roberts	W 84–75	5–25 (3–12)	40 – Juenemann	23 – Smith	5 – Smith	Baxter Arena (548); Omaha, NE
February 28, 2026; 1:00 pm, SLN		Denver	L 50–71	5–26 (3–13)	12 – Burke Perryman	12 – Smith	2 – Tied (2)	Baxter Arena; Omaha, NE
Summit League tournament
March 4, 2026; 4:30 pm, SLN	(8)	vs. (9) North Dakota; First round	W 49–39	6–26	17 – Stephens	16 – Smith	5 – Estupiñan	Denny Sanford Premier Center (3,675); Sioux Falls, SD
March 5, 2026; 2:33 pm, SLN	(8)	vs. (1) North Dakota State; Quarterfinal	L 37–87	6–27	8 – Tied (2)	7 – Smith	2 – Shelby	Denny Sanford Premier Center (6,176); Sioux Falls, SD
*Non-conference game. ^{#}Rankings from AP Poll. (#) Tournament seedings in parentheses. All times are in Central.
