= 2025–26 North Dakota State Bison women's basketball team =

College women's basketball season

2025–26 North Dakota State Bison women's basketball

Summit League regular season champions

WBIT, Second round
- Conference: Summit League
- Record: 29–5 (15–1 Summit)
- Head coach: Jory Collins (7th season)
- Associate head coach: Dylan Geissert
- Assistant coaches: Jaime Adams; Michaela Everett
- Home arena: Scheels Center

2025–26 Summit League women's basketball standings
	Conf.				Overall
Team	W		L	PCT	W		L	PCT
North Dakota State	15	–	1	.938	29	–	5	.853
South Dakota State †	14	–	2	.875	27	–	7	.794
South Dakota	12	–	4	.750	26	–	10	.722
Oral Roberts	8	–	8	.500	15	–	15	.500
St. Thomas	8	–	8	.500	16	–	16	.500
Denver	5	–	11	.313	11	–	19	.367
Kansas City	4	–	12	.250	7	–	23	.233
North Dakota	3	–	13	.188	7	–	24	.226
Omaha	3	–	13	.188	6	–	27	.182
† 2026 Summit League tournament winner

The 2025–26 North Dakota State Bison women's basketball team represented North Dakota State University during the 2025–26 NCAA Division I women's basketball season. The Bison, who were led by seventh-year head coach Jory Collins, played their home games at the Scheels Center, as members of the Summit League.

The Bison finished the regular season 26–3 overall, and 15–1 in the Summit League to finish in first place and win the program's first Summit League regular season title. In the Summit League tournament, they defeated Omaha in the quarterfinals, St. Thomas in the semifinals, but fell to South Dakota State in the championship game. Since they were the conference's regular season champion but did not make the NCAA tournament, the Bison received an automatic bid and top 4 seed to the 2026 Women's Basketball Invitation Tournament (WBIT). In the WBIT, they defeated Chattanooga in the first round, but fell to Columbia in the second round. By the season's end, the Bison racked up 29 wins, which is the most in the NDSU Division I era and the most for the program since 1996.

== Previous season ==
The Bison finished the 2024–25 season 21–12, 11–5 in Summit League play to finish in third place. In the Summit League tournament, the Bison fell in the quarterfinals to Kansas City. However, they did receive an at-large bid to the 2025 Women's National Invitation Tournament, and yet again received a first round bye. The Bison would defeat New Mexico in the second round, Washington State in the Super 16, but fell to Troy in the program's first Great 8 appearance.

== Offseason ==
=== Departures ===
Name	Number	Pos.	Height	Year	Hometown	Reason for departure
Abbie Draper	2	F	6'2"	Senior	Waverly, IA	Graduated
Claire Stern	11	F	6'0"	Freshman	Maple Grove, MN	Medically retired
Sacia Vanderpool	20	F	6'5"	Senior	Byron, MN	Graduated
Taryn Hamling	21	G	5'9"	Sophomore	Grand Rapids, MN	Transferred to Minot State
Abby Schulte	24	G	5'10"	Senior	Maple Grove, MN	Graduated

=== Incoming transfers ===
Name	Number	Pos.	Height	Year	Hometown	Previous school
Audrey Martinez-Stewart	5	G	5'5"	Senior	St. Paul, MN	Missouri–St. Louis
Jocelyn Schiller	30	G	5'7"	Sophomore	Grand Forks, ND	North Dakota
Lily Niebuhr	31	F	6'2"	Senior	Jordan, MN	Indiana State

=== 2025 recruiting class ===
College recruiting information
Name	Hometown	School	Height	Weight	Commit date
Sophie Hawkinson; G	Plymouth, Minnesota	Wayzata High School	5 ft 8 in (1.73 m)	N/A	Nov 13, 2024
Sophie Hawkinson; G	Recruit ratings: Scout: Rivals: 247Sports: ESPN: (0)				
McKenna Johnson; F	Mandan, North Dakota	Mandan High School	6 ft 0 in (1.83 m)	N/A	Sep 10, 2024
McKenna Johnson; F	Recruit ratings: Scout: Rivals: 247Sports: ESPN: (0)				
Overall recruit ranking:
Note: In many cases, Scout, Rivals, 247Sports, On3, and ESPN may conflict in their listings of height and weight.; In these cases, the average was taken. ESPN grades are on a 100-point scale.; Sources: "2025 Team Ranking". Rivals.

== Roster ==
2025–26 North Dakota State Bison women's basketball team
Players
Coaches

Pos.	#	Name	Height	Year	Hometown
G	1	Molly Lenz	5 ft 8 in (1.73 m)	Jr	Victoria, MN
G	5	Audrey Martinez-Stewart	5 ft 5 in (1.65 m)	Sr	St. Paul, MN
G	8	Amelia Hobson	6 ft 0 in (1.83 m)	So	Parkdale, AUS
G	10	Abby Graham	5 ft 10 in (1.78 m)	Sr	Portland, OR
G	12	Marisa Frost	5 ft 8 in (1.73 m)	So	Lino Lakes, MN
G	13	Sophie Hawkinson	5 ft 8 in (1.73 m)	Fr	Plymouth, MN
F	15	Karrington Asp	6 ft 2 in (1.88 m)	RS Fr	Epworth, IA
F	22	Avery Koenen	6 ft 3 in (1.91 m)	Jr	Montevideo, MN
G	30	Jocelyn Schiller	5 ft 7 in (1.7 m)	So	Grand Forks, ND
F	31	Lily Niebuhr	6 ft 2 in (1.88 m)	Sr	Jordan, MN
F	32	Miriley Simon	6 ft 1 in (1.85 m)	Jr	West Fargo, ND
F	35	McKenna Johnson	6 ft 0 in (1.83 m)	Fr	Mandan, ND
G	40	Abby Krzewinski	5 ft 11 in (1.8 m)	Jr	Wayzata, MN

Head coach

- Jory Collins (Emporia State)

Assistant coach(es)

- Dylan Geissert (Emporia State)
- Jaime Adams (North Dakota State)
- Michaela Everett (Wisconsin)

Legend

- (C) Team captain
- (S) Suspended
- (I) Ineligible
- (W) Walk-on
- Injured
- Current redshirt

Roster
Last update: September 3, 2025

== Schedule and results ==
Date time, TV	Rank^{#}	Opponent^{#}	Result	Record	High points	High rebounds	High assists	Site (attendance) city, state
Exhibition
October 26, 2025*; 12:00 p.m.		vs. Creighton	L 61–64	–	–	–	–	Sanford Pentagon; Sioux Falls, SD
Non-conference regular season
November 3, 2025*; 6:00 p.m., ESPN+		at Northern Iowa	W 63–49	1–0	11 – Tied (4)	15 – Koenen	3 – Lenz	McLeod Center (2,710); Cedar Falls, IA
November 7, 2025*; 7:00 p.m., WDAY Xtra/Summit League Network		Gonzaga	L 66–81	1–1	17 – Koenen	7 – Koenen	4 – Frost	Scheels Center (1,906); Fargo, ND
November 10, 2025*; 11:00 a.m., WDAY Xtra/SLN		Concordia–Moorhead	W 84–60	2–1	16 – Tied (2)	5 – Tied (3)	7 – Frost	Scheels Center (2,928); Fargo, ND
November 16, 2025*; 12:00 p.m., BTN		vs. Nebraska	L 70–82	2–2	26 – Koenen	9 – Koenen	3 – Lenz	Sanford Pentagon (1,685); Sioux Falls, SD
November 21, 2025*; 7:00 p.m., WDAY Xtra/SLN		Tulane	W 83–72	3–2	22 – Koenen	13 – Koenen	5 – Koenen	Scheels Center (1,007); Fargo, ND
November 28, 2025*; 10:00 a.m.		vs. Campbell; Osprey Thanksgiving Classic	W 71–49	4–2	21 – Frost	7 – Tied (2)	5 – Tied (2)	UNF Arena (50); Jacksonville, FL
November 29, 2025*; 10:00 a.m.		vs. Bethune–Cookman; Osprey Thanksgiving Classic	W 85–36	5–2	19 – Koenen	12 – Koenen	7 – Schiller	UNF Arena (50); Jacksonville, FL
December 3, 2025*; 7:00 p.m., CBSSN		Montana State; Big Sky–Summit Challenge	W 90–65	6–2	18 – Asp	11 – Koenen	5 – Asp	Scheels Center (1,014); Fargo, ND
December 6, 2025*; 1:00 p.m., ESPN+		at Weber State; Big Sky–Summit Challenge	W 79–72	7–2	21 – Koenen	10 – Koenen	3 – Schiller	Dee Events Center (472); Ogden, UT
December 11, 2025*; 6:00 p.m., ESPN+		at Eastern Illinois	W 83–55	8–2	22 – Koenen	16 – Koenen	3 – Tied (3)	Groniger Arena (321); Charleston, IL
December 16, 2025*; 12:00 p.m., ESPN+		at Pepperdine; Malibu Classic	W 82–80 ^{OT}	9–2	29 – Koenen	12 – Koenen	3 – Schiller	Firestone Fieldhouse (269); Malibu, CA
December 17, 2025*; 12:00 p.m.		vs. UTRGV; Malibu Classic	W 82–60	10–2	22 – Asp	12 – Asp	5 – Koenen	Firestone Fieldhouse (127); Malibu, CA
December 29, 2025*; 6:00 p.m., WDAY Xtra/SLN		Saint Mary's (MN)	W 94–36	11–2	19 – Koenen	7 – Koenen	4 – Tied (2)	Scheels Center (772); Fargo, ND
Summit League regular season
January 1, 2026; 7:00 p.m., SLN		at Oral Roberts	W 76–68	12–2 (1–0)	17 – Tied (2)	14 – Koenen	6 – Schiller	Mabee Center (2,178); Tulsa, OK
January 3, 2026; 1:00 p.m., SLN		at Denver	W 81–44	13–2 (2–0)	25 – Koenen	11 – Koenen	4 – Tied (2)	Hamilton Gymnasium (398); Denver, CO
January 8, 2026; 7:00 p.m., WDAY Xtra/SLN		Kansas City	W 77–54	14–2 (3–0)	19 – Schiller	16 – Koenen	5 – Koenen	Scheels Center (887); Fargo, ND
January 10, 2026; 1:00 p.m., WDAY Xtra/SLN		Omaha	W 94–39	15–2 (4–0)	24 – Lenz	16 – Koenen	3 – Tied (4)	Scheels Center (1,274); Fargo, ND
January 17, 2026; 2:00 p.m., SLN		at South Dakota State	W 76–68	16–2 (5–0)	26 – Koenen	13 – Koenen	5 – Frost	First Bank and Trust Arena (4,138); Brookings, SD
January 21, 2026; 7:00 p.m., SLN		at St. Thomas	W 75–66	17–2 (6–0)	18 – Koenen	14 – Koenen	7 – Schiller	Lee and Penny Anderson Arena (478); St. Paul, MN
January 24, 2026; 1:00 p.m., WDAY Xtra/SLN		South Dakota	W 79–56	18–2 (7–0)	22 – Koenen	10 – Koenen	2 – Tied (3)	Scheels Center (2,004); Fargo, ND
January 29, 2026; 7:00 p.m., WDAY Xtra/SLN		Denver	W 95–55	19–2 (8–0)	22 – Frost	8 – Koenen	4 – Schiller	Scheels Center (1,234); Fargo, ND
January 31, 2026; 1:00 p.m., WDAY Xtra/SLN		Oral Roberts	W 93–72	20–2 (9–0)	25 – Koenen	13 – Koenen	5 – Schiller	Scheels Center (1,688); Fargo, ND
February 5, 2026; 7:00 p.m., SLN		at Kansas City	W 74–49	21–2 (10–0)	29 – Frost	15 – Koenen	3 – Tied (2)	Swinney Recreation Center (351); Kansas City, MO
February 7, 2026; 1:00 p.m., SLN		at Omaha	W 102–51	22–2 (11–0)	16 – Tied (2)	7 – Tied (2)	4 – Tied (2)	Baxter Arena (1,062); Omaha, NE
February 15, 2026; 1:00 p.m., SLN		at North Dakota	W 87–51	23–2 (12–0)	29 – Koenen	13 – Koenen	4 – Frost	Betty Engelstad Sioux Center (2,019); Grand Forks, ND
February 19, 2026; 7:00 p.m., WDAY Xtra/SLN		St. Thomas	W 73–67	24–2 (13–0)	16 – Koenen	8 – Krzewinski	4 – Frost	Scheels Center (959); Fargo, ND
February 21, 2026; 1:00 p.m., SLN		at South Dakota	W 81–68	25–2 (14–0)	30 – Koenen	14 – Koenen	5 – Koenen	Sanford Coyote Sports Center (2,304); Vermillion, SD
February 25, 2026; 7:00 p.m., ABC ND/SLN		South Dakota State	L 44–59	25–3 (14–1)	11 – Tied (2)	5 – Koenen	1 – Tied (4)	Scheels Center (3,708); Fargo, ND
February 28, 2026; 1:00 p.m., WDAY Xtra/SLN		North Dakota	W 95–70	26–3 (15–1)	29 – Koenen	15 – Koenen	4 – Frost	Scheels Center (2,944); Fargo, ND
Summit League tournament
March 5, 2026*; 2:33 p.m., SLN	(1)	vs. (8) Omaha; Quarterfinal	W 87–37	27–3	28 – Frost	8 – Asp	4 – Tied (3)	Denny Sanford Premier Center (6,176); Sioux Falls, SD
March 7, 2026*; 12:00 p.m., SLN	(1)	vs. (5) St. Thomas; Semifinal	W 63–51	28–3	31 – Koenen	8 – Koenen	3 – Krzewinski	Denny Sanford Premier Center (8,476); Sioux Falls, SD
March 8, 2026*; 3:15 p.m., CBSSN	(1)	vs. (2) South Dakota State; Championship	L 51–64	28–4	12 – Tied (2)	13 – Koenen	7 – Koenen	Denny Sanford Premier Center (7,930); Sioux Falls, SD
Women's Basketball Invitation Tournament (WBIT)
March 19, 2026*; 7:00 p.m., ESPN+	(1 NDS)	Chattanooga; First round	W 75–62	29–4	16 – Koenen	11 – Koenen	3 – Krzewinski	Scheels Center (1,490); Fargo, ND
March 22, 2026*; 1:00 p.m., ESPN+	(1 NDS)	(4 NDS) Columbia; Second round	L 57–86	29–5	21 – Koenen	7 – Koenen	2 – Hobson	Scheels Center (1,769); Fargo, ND
*Non-conference game. ^{#}Rankings from AP Poll. (#) Tournament seedings in parentheses. NDS=North Dakota State region. All times are in Central.

== Awards and accolades ==
=== Summit League Player of the Week ===
Week	Player(s) of the Week	School
Nov. 25	Avery Koenen	North Dakota State
Dec. 16	Avery Koenen (2)	North Dakota State (2)
Dec. 23	Avery Koenen (3)	North Dakota State (3)
Jan. 6	Avery Koenen (4)	North Dakota State (4)
Jan. 13	Avery Koenen (5)	North Dakota State (5)
Jan. 20	Avery Koenen (6)	North Dakota State (6)
Feb. 10	Avery Koenen (7)	North Dakota State (7)
Feb. 17	Avery Koenen (8)	North Dakota State (8)

=== Summit League Regular Season Awards ===
==== Individual Awards ====
- Avery Koenen (Player of the Year, Defensive Player of the Year)
- Karrington Asp (Freshman of the Year, Sixth Woman of the Year)
- Jory Collins (Coach of the Year)

==== All–Summit League First Team ====
- Avery Koenen

==== All–Summit League Second Team ====
- Marisa Frost
- Jocelyn Schiller

==== All–Defensive Team ====
- Avery Koenen

==== All–Freshman Team ====
- Karrington Asp

=== Summit League All–Tournament Team ===
- Avery Koenen

== Rankings ==
Ranking movements Legend: ██ Increase in ranking ██ Decrease in ranking — = Not ranked RV = Received votes
	Week																				
Poll	Pre	1	2	3	4	5	6	7	8	9	10	11	12	13	14	15	16	17	18	19	Final
AP	—	—	—	—	—	—	—	—	—	—	—	RV	—	—	RV	RV	RV	—	—	RV	
Coaches	—	—	—	—	—	—	—	—	—	—	—	—	—	—	—	—	RV	RV	—	—	
