= 2025–26 South Dakota Coyotes women's basketball team =

American college basketball season

2025–26 South Dakota Coyotes women's basketball

WNIT, Fab 4
- Conference: Summit League
- Record: 26–10 (12–4 Summit)
- Head coach: Carrie Eighmey (2nd season)
- Assistant coaches: Paul Fessler; Devin Eighmey; Dalton Smith; Bailey Morris
- Home arena: Sanford Coyote Sports Center

2025–26 Summit League women's basketball standings
	Conf.				Overall
Team	W		L	PCT	W		L	PCT
North Dakota State	15	–	1	.938	29	–	5	.853
South Dakota State †	14	–	2	.875	27	–	7	.794
South Dakota	12	–	4	.750	26	–	10	.722
Oral Roberts	8	–	8	.500	15	–	15	.500
St. Thomas	8	–	8	.500	16	–	16	.500
Denver	5	–	11	.313	11	–	19	.367
Kansas City	4	–	12	.250	7	–	23	.233
North Dakota	3	–	13	.188	7	–	24	.226
Omaha	3	–	13	.188	6	–	27	.182
† 2026 Summit League tournament winner

The 2025–26 South Dakota Coyotes women's basketball team represents the University of South Dakota during the 2025–26 NCAA Division I women's basketball season. The Coyotes, led by second-year head coach Carrie Eighmey, play their home games at the Sanford Coyote Sports Center in Vermillion, South Dakota as members of the Summit League.

== Previous season ==
The Coyotes finished the 2024–25 season 11–19, 5–11 in Summit League play, to finish in a tie for seventh place. They were defeated by Oral Roberts in the quarterfinals of the Summit League tournament.

== Roster ==
2025–26 South Dakota Coyotes women's basketball team
Players
Coaches

Pos.	#	Name	Height	Year	Previous school	Hometown
G	0	Olivia Kieffer	5 ft 10 in (1.78 m)	Jr	Rapid City Christian School	Rapid City, South Dakota
G	1	Molly Joyce	5 ft 7 in (1.7 m)	Jr	Truman State	Algona, Iowa
G	2	Jenna Hopp	5 ft 11 in (1.8 m)	Jr	South Dakota State	Glenwood, Iowa
G	3	Coral Mason	5 ft 10 in (1.78 m)	Jr	Viborg-Hurley High School	Hurley, South Dakota
G	5	Angelina Robles	5 ft 5 in (1.65 m)	Sr	Denver	San Diego, California
G	10	Alyssa Bartlett	5 ft 7 in (1.7 m)	Fr	Southeast Polk High School	Pleasant Hill, Iowa
F	11	Patience Williams	5 ft 11 in (1.8 m)	Sr	Georgia State	Minneapolis, Minnesota
G	12	Alex Flattery	5 ft 9 in (1.75 m)	So	Nebraska–Kearney	Sioux City, Iowa
C	14	Josie Hill	6 ft 1 in (1.85 m)	Sr	Chicago State	Rapid City, South Dakota
F	20	Katy Reyerson	6 ft 2 in (1.88 m)	Jr	Northern Iowa	Marshalltown, Iowa
F	22	Brooke Jensen	6 ft 0 in (1.83 m)	Fr	Vermillion High School	Vermillion, South Dakota
F	23	Grace Peterson	6 ft 0 in (1.83 m)	Fr	Washington High School	Sioux Falls, South Dakota
F	24	Elise Turrubiates	5 ft 11 in (1.8 m)	Sr	Tarleton State	Hobbs, New Mexico
G	25	Olivia Moore	5 ft 9 in (1.75 m)	Jr	Seattle	Spokane, Washington
G	33	Tori Schlagel	5 ft 9 in (1.75 m)	Fr	Eden Prairie High School	Eden Prairie, Minnesota

Head coach

- Carrie Eighmey (Hastings)

Assistant coach(es)

- Paul Fessler (Northern Iowa)
- Devin Eighmey (Missouri State)
- Dalton Smith (Nebraska–Kearney)
- Bailey Morris (Concordia Nebraska)

Legend

- (C) Team captain
- (S) Suspended
- (I) Ineligible
- (W) Walk-on
- Injured
- Current redshirt

Roster
Last update: February 1, 2026

== Schedule and results ==
Date time, TV	Rank^{#}	Opponent^{#}	Result	Record	High points	High rebounds	High assists	Site (attendance) city, state
Non-conference regular season
November 3, 2025*; 5:00 pm, SLN		York (NE)	W 104–33	1–0	16 – Tied	9 – Bartlett	4 – Tied	Sanford Coyote Sports Center (1,538); Vermillion, SD
November 7, 2025*; 11:00 am, Midco Sports/SLN		Air Force	W 75–50	2–0	22 – Robles	9 – Williams	4 – Turrubiates	Sanford Coyote Sports Center (1,592); Vermillion, SD
November 10, 2025*; 7:00 pm, SLN		Buena Vista	W 104–54	3–0	17 – Tied	11 – Williams	5 – Joyce	Sanford Coyote Sports Center (1,070); Vermillion, SD
November 13, 2025*; 4:00 pm, ESPN+		at Kansas State	W 72–71	4–0	15 – Schlagel	6 – Hopp	4 – Joyce	Bramlage Coliseum (2,996); Manhattan, KS
November 16, 2025*; 3:00 pm, ESPN+		at Idaho State	W 64–63	5–0	14 – Robles	18 – Williams	3 – Joyce	Reed Gym (753); Pocatello, ID
November 21, 2025*; 7:00 pm, Midco Sports/SLN		Valparaiso	W 85−44	6−0	15 – Turrubiates	16 – Williams	5 – Robles	Sanford Coyote Sports Center (1,428); Vermillion, SD
November 25, 2025*; 7:00 pm, SLN		Arkansas–Pine Bluff	W 73−41	7−0	21 – Robles	7 – Turrubiates	5 – Robles	Sanford Coyote Sports Center (1,160); Vermillion, SD
November 29, 2025*; 2:00 pm, MWN		at Wyoming	L 59–66	7–1	20 – Robles	14 – Robles	2 – Hill	Arena-Auditorium (2,080); Laramie, WY
December 3, 2025*; 9:00 pm, ESPN+		at Portland State; Big Sky–Summit Challenge	W 75–51	8–1	23 – Robles	9 – Tied	2 – Tied	Viking Pavilion (305); Portland, OR
December 6, 2025*; 1:00 pm, SLN		Eastern Washington; Big Sky–Summit Challenge	L 63–67	8–2	13 – Tied	9 – Turrubiates	4 – Joyce	Sanford Coyote Sports Center (1,261); Vermillion, SD
December 10, 2025*; 11:00 am, ESPN+		at Bradley	L 62–65	8–3	14 – Schlagel	7 – Robles	6 – Robles	Renaissance Coliseum (3,704); Peoria, IL
December 17, 2025*; 8:00 pm, ESPN+		at Pepperdine; Malibu Classic	L 65–73	8–4	19 – Turrubiates	8 – Williams	2 – Tied	Firestone Fieldhouse (261); Malibu, CA
December 21, 2025*; 1:00 pm		vs. UT Rio Grande Valley; Malibu Classic	W 71−44	9−4	24 – Robles	10 – Hill	5 – Joyce	Firestone Fieldhouse (78); Malibu, CA
December 30, 2025*; 2:00 pm, SLN		Saint Mary (NE)	W 95–42	10–4	15 – Moore	11 – Kieffer	7 – Moore	Sanford Coyote Sports Center (1,111); Vermillion, SD
Summit League regular season
January 3, 2026; 2:00 pm, SLN		at Kansas City	W 67–47	11–4 (1–0)	21 – Joyce	9 – Flattery	4 – Robles	Swinney Recreation Center (351); Kansas City, MO
January 8, 2026; 7:00 pm, SLN		Oral Roberts	L 61–83	11–5 (1–1)	24 – Joyce	11 – Flattery	4 – Robles	Sanford Coyote Sports Center (1,107); Vermillion, SD
January 10, 2026; 4:00 pm, SLN		at St. Thomas	W 72–65	12–5 (2–1)	21 – Tied	5 – Tied	6 – Robles	Schoenecker Arena (998); St. Paul, MN
January 14, 2026; 7:00 pm, Midco Sports/SLN		North Dakota	W 62–39	13–5 (3–1)	20 – Joyce	6 – Tied	4 – Robles	Sanford Coyote Sports Center (1,232); Vermillion, SD
January 17, 2026; 1:00 pm, SLN		Denver	W 75–55	14–5 (4–1)	21 – Williams	13 – Williams	6 – Robles	Sanford Coyote Sports Center (1,988); Vermillion, SD
January 22, 2026; 6:30 pm, SLN		at Omaha	W 67–39	15–5 (5–1)	16 – Joyce	8 – Tied	3 – Tied	Baxter Arena (1,334); Omaha, NE
January 24, 2026; 1:00 pm, SLN		at North Dakota State	L 56–79	15–6 (5–2)	12 – Tied	7 – Turrubiates	4 – Robles	Scheels Center (2,004); Fargo, ND
January 28, 2026; 7:00 pm, SLN		St. Thomas	W 67–55	16–6 (6–2)	20 – Robles	15 – Turrubiates	3 – Tied	Sanford Coyote Sports Center (1,388); Vermillion, SD
January 31, 2026; 1:00 pm, Midco Sports/SLN		South Dakota State	W 73–54	17–6 (7–2)	25 – Robles	12 – Turrubiates	4 – Hopp	Sanford Coyote Sports Center (3,060); Vermillion, SD
February 5, 2026; 7:00 pm, SLN		at Denver	W 53–42	18–6 (8–2)	14 – Robles	15 – Williams	3 – Joyce	Hamilton Gymnasium (414); Denver, CO
February 7, 2026; 2:00 pm, SLN		at Oral Roberts	W 74–69	19–6 (9–2)	28 – Robles	14 – Turrubiates	4 – Robles	Mabee Center (537); Tulsa, OK
February 12, 2026; 7:00 pm, SLN		Kansas City	W 70–65 ^{OT}	20–6 (10–2)	17 – Schlagel	12 – Turrubiates	7 – Robles	Sanford Coyote Sports Center; Vermillion, SD
February 19, 2026; 7:00 pm, Midco Sports/SLN		Omaha	W 69–66	21–6 (11–2)	21 – Robles	9 – Turrubiates	2 – Tied (3)	Sanford Coyote Sports Center (1,189); Vermillion, SD
February 21, 2026; 1:00 pm, Midco Sports/SLN		North Dakota State	L 68–81	21–7 (11–3)	24 – Joyce	8 – Turrubiates	1 – Tied (3)	Sanford Coyote Sports Center (2,304); Vermillion, SD
February 25, 2026; 7:00 pm, SLN		at North Dakota	W 80–66	22–7 (12–3)	17 – Robles	8 – Williams	5 – Robles	Betty Engelstad Sioux Center (1,452); Grand Forks, ND
February 28, 2026; 6:00 pm, SLN		at South Dakota State	L 49–82	22–8 (12–4)	21 – Joyce	9 – Turrubiates	2 – Joyce	First Bank and Trust Arena (4,449); Brookings, SD
Summit League tournament
March 6, 2026*; 2:30 pm, SLN	(3)	vs. (6) Denver; Quarterfinal	W 61–50	23–8	21 – Robles	8 – Williams	4 – Turrubiates	Denny Sanford Premier Center (5,315); Sioux Falls, SD
March 7, 2026*; 2:25 pm, SLN	(3)	vs. (2) South Dakota State; Semifinal	L 59–74	23–9	18 – Robles	11 – Turrubiates	4 – Joyce	Denny Sanford Premier Center (8,476); Sioux Falls, SD
Women's National Invitation Tournament (WNIT)
March 22, 2026*; 1:00 pm, Midco Sports/SLN		Northern Colorado; Second round	W 80–60	24–9	21 – Robles	8 – Turrubiates	5 – Tied (2)	Sanford Coyote Sports Center (1,225); Vermillion, SD
March 26, 2026*; 7:00 pm, Midco Sports/SLN		Pepperdine; Super 16	W 73–57	25–9	20 – Tied (2)	9 – Williams	5 – Joyce	Sanford Coyote Sports Center (1,596); Vermillion, SD
March 29, 2026*; 1:00 pm		Montana State; Great 8	W 65–56	26–9	31 – Joyce	8 – Robles	3 – Robles	Sanford Coyote Sports Center (2,375); Vermillion, SD
April 1, 2026*; 7:00 p.m.		Illinois State; Fab 4	L 60–67	26–10	16 – Joyce	7 – Tied (2)	5 – Hopp	Sanford Coyote Sports Center (3,002); Vermillion, SD
*Non-conference game. ^{#}Rankings from AP Poll. (#) Tournament seedings in parentheses. All times are in Central.
