= 2025–26 Denver Pioneers women's basketball team =

American college basketball season

2025–26 Denver Pioneers women's basketball
- Conference: Summit League
- Record: 11–19 (5–11 Summit)
- Head coach: Doshia Woods (6th season)
- Associate head coach: Lindsay Werntz
- Assistant coaches: Janet Butler; Alex Frazier
- Home arena: Hamilton Gymnasium

2025–26 Summit League women's basketball standings
| | Conf. | | | | Overall |
| Team | W | | L | PCT | W | | L | PCT |
|---|---|---|---|---|---|---|---|---|
| North Dakota State | 15 | – | 1 | .938 | 27 | – | 3 | .900 |
| South Dakota State | 14 | – | 2 | .875 | 25 | – | 6 | .806 |
| South Dakota | 12 | – | 4 | .750 | 23 | – | 8 | .742 |
| Oral Roberts | 8 | – | 8 | .500 | 15 | – | 15 | .500 |
| St. Thomas | 8 | – | 8 | .500 | 16 | – | 15 | .516 |
| Denver | 5 | – | 11 | .313 | 11 | – | 19 | .367 |
| Kansas City | 4 | – | 12 | .250 | 7 | – | 23 | .233 |
| Omaha | 3 | – | 13 | .188 | 6 | – | 27 | .182 |
| North Dakota | 3 | – | 13 | .188 | 7 | – | 24 | .226 |
† 2026 Summit League tournament winner As of March 6, 2026

The 2025–26 Denver Pioneers women's basketball team represented the University of Denver during the 2025–26 NCAA Division I women's basketball season. The Pioneers, who were led by sixth-year head coach Doshia Woods, played their home games at Hamilton Gymnasium in Denver, Colorado as members of the Summit League.

This was Denver's last season as members of the Summit League, as they will be joing the West Coast Conference, effective July 1, 2026.

The Pioneers finished the regular season 11–18 overall, and 5–11 in the Summit League to finish in sixth place. In the Summit League tournament they lost to South Dakota in the quarterfinals.

== Previous season ==
The Pioneers finished the 2024–25 season 9–21, 2–14 in Summit League play, to finish in ninth (last) place. They were defeated by Omaha in the first round of the Summit League tournament.

== Roster ==
2025–26 Denver Pioneers women's basketball team
Players
Coaches

| Pos. | # | Name | Height | Year | Previous school | Hometown |
|---|---|---|---|---|---|---|
| F | 0 | Brooke Murrell | 6 ft 3 in (1.91 m) | RS So | Hawai'i | Aurora, Colorado |
| F | 1 | Laila McLeod | 6 ft 0 in (1.83 m) | Sr | Grand Canyon | Dallas, Texas |
| G | 2 | Lexi Pletschette | 5 ft 9 in (1.75 m) | Jr | Chabot College | Livermore, California |
| G | 3 | Tori Baker | 5 ft 7 in (1.7 m) | Fr | Highlands Ranch High School | Highlands Ranch, Colorado |
| C | 5 | Anna Rosenberger | 6 ft 3 in (1.91 m) | So | Glenbrook South High School | Glenview, Illinois |
| F | 8 | Natalia Fanjul | 5 ft 10 in (1.78 m) | Fr | Socrates Educa International School | Altafulla, Spain |
| PF | 9 | Teodora Simoncevic | 6 ft 2 in (1.88 m) | Fr | ŽKK Art Basket | Ivanjica, Serbia |
| G | 10 | Coryn Watts | 5 ft 7 in (1.7 m) | So | Regis Jesuit High School | Aurora, Colorado |
| G | 11 | Karolina Padilla | 5 ft 7 in (1.7 m) | Jr | Cochise College | Douglas, Arizona |
| G | 12 | Laia Monclova | 6 ft 1 in (1.85 m) | Jr | La Salle | Mallorca, Spain |
| C | 13 | Ana Conde | 6 ft 0 in (1.83 m) | So | Siena | Madrid, Spain |
| G | 15 | Jocelyn Medina | 5 ft 6 in (1.68 m) | Jr | College of the Sequoias | Arbuckle, California |
| F | 22 | Paula Oliva | 6 ft 0 in (1.83 m) | Fr | Col. Maria Auxiliadora | Salamanca, Spain |
| C | 32 | Lily Esparza | 6 ft 2 in (1.88 m) | So | Boylan Catholic High School | Rockford, Illinois |

Head coach

- Doshia Woods (Western Illinois)

Assistant coach(es)

- Lindsay Werntz (Purdue Fort Wayne)
- Janet Butler (Louisiana College)
- Alex Frazier (East Carolina)

Legend

- (C) Team captain
- (S) Suspended
- (I) Ineligible
- (W) Walk-on
- Injured
- Current redshirt

Roster
Last update: February 3, 2026

== Schedule and results ==
| Date time, TV | Rank^{#} | Opponent^{#} | Result | Record | High points | High rebounds | High assists | Site (attendance) city, state |
Non-conference regular season
| November 3, 2025*; 6:00 pm, SLN/Altitude 2 | | Air Force | L 50–59 | 0–1 | 19 – Watts | 8 – Monclova | 3 – Tied | Hamilton Gymnasium (594); Denver, CO |
| November 7, 2025*; 7:00 pm, ESPN+ | | at UC San Diego | L 54–72 | 0–2 | 15 – Watts | 8 – Murrell | 3 – Monclova | LionTree Arena (1,292); La Jolla, CA |
| November 9, 2025*; 3:00 pm, ESPN+ | | at Loyola Marymount | L 57–64 | 0–3 | 23 – Watts | 6 – Murrell | 2 – Tied | Gersten Pavilion; Los Angeles, CA |
| November 14, 2025*; 6:00 pm, ESPN+ | | at Northern Colorado | W 56–53 | 1–3 | 18 – Watts | 7 – Murrell | 3 – Conde | Bank of Colorado Arena (730); Greeley, CO |
| November 16, 2025*; 1:00 pm, SLN | | Cal State Fullerton | W 60–55 | 2–3 | 23 – Watts | 7 – McLeod | 4 – Baker | Hamilton Gymnasium (343); Denver, CO |
| November 21, 2025*; 6:00 pm, SLN | | Regis | W 67−40 | 3−3 | 20 – Watts | 9 – Conde | 4 – Medina | Hamilton Gymnasium (1,026); Denver, CO |
| November 29, 2025*; 2:00 pm, ESPN+ | | at UTEP | L 52−69 | 3−4 | 19 – Watts | 8 – Murrell | 2 – Medina | Don Haskins Center (1,096); El Paso, TX |
| December 3, 2025*; 7:00 pm, ESPN+ | | at Eastern Washington; Big Sky–Summit League Challenge | L 65–66 | 3–5 | 19 – Watts | 7 – Tied | 5 – Watts | Reese Court (490); Cheney, WA |
| December 6, 2025*; 12:00 pm, SLN | | Idaho; Big Sky–Summit League Challenge | L 54–84 | 3–6 | 15 – Watts | 5 – Murrell | 4 – Monclova | Hamilton Gymnasium (504); Denver, CO |
| December 9, 2025*; 3:00 pm, SLN | | MSU Denver | W 92–68 | 4–6 | 30 – Watts | 15 – Murrell | 6 – Baker | Hamilton Gymnasium (251); Denver, CO |
| December 14, 2025*; 1:00 pm, ESPN+ | | at Kansas | L 38–77 | 4–7 | 10 – Baker | 6 – Conde | 3 – Tied | Allen Fieldhouse (3,709); Lawrence, KS |
| December 17, 2025*; 6:00 pm, SLN | | Colorado Christian | W 80–53 | 5–7 | 30 – Monclova | 8 – Tied | 5 – Baker | Hamilton Gymnasium (465); Denver, CO |
| December 19, 2025*; 1:00 pm, SLN | | California Baptist | W 76−71 | 6−7 | 32 – Watts | 8 – Monclova | 5 – Watts | Hamilton Gymnasium (330); Denver, CO |
Summit League regular season
| January 1, 2026; 2:00 pm, SLN | | North Dakota | W 64–57 | 7–7 (1–0) | 23 – Watts | 7 – Monclova | 3 – Tied | Hamilton Gymnasium (575); Denver, CO |
| January 3, 2026; 12:00 pm, SLN | | North Dakota State | L 44–81 | 7–8 (1–1) | 15 – Monclova | 4 – Rosenberger | 4 – Baker | Hamilton Gymnasium (398); Denver, CO |
| January 8, 2026; 6:00 pm, SLN | | at St. Thomas | L 65–74 ^{OT} | 7–9 (1–2) | 17 – Tied | 10 – Monclova | 6 – Monclova | Lee & Penny Anderson Arena (206); St. Paul, MN |
| January 15, 2026; 6:00 pm, SLN | | at South Dakota State | L 44–90 | 7–10 (1–3) | 14 – Watts | 6 – Simoncevic | 2 – Baker | First Bank and Trust Arena (2,480); Brookings, SD |
| January 17, 2026; 12:00 pm, SLN | | at South Dakota | L 55–75 | 7–11 (1–4) | 19 – Watts | 9 – Murrell | 1 – Tied | Sanford Coyote Sports Center (1,988); Vermillion, SD |
| January 21, 2026; 6:00 pm, SLN | | Kansas City | W 64–54 | 8–11 (2–4) | 21 – Watts | 12 – Monclova | 8 – Watts | Hamilton Gymnasium (372); Denver, CO |
| January 24, 2026; 11:00 am, SLN | | Oral Roberts | W 86–74 | 9–11 (3–4) | 31 – Watts | 13 – Medina | 7 – Medina | Hamilton Gymnasium (449); Denver, CO |
| January 29, 2026; 6:00 pm, SLN | | at North Dakota State | L 55–95 | 9–12 (3–5) | 19 – Watts | 4 – Murrell | 2 – Conde | Scheels Center (1,234); Fargo, ND |
| January 31, 2026; 12:00 pm, SLN | | at North Dakota | L 72–73 | 9–13 (3–6) | 23 – Medina | 6 – Medina | 5 – Monclova | Betty Engelstad Sioux Center (1,511); Grand Forks, ND |
| February 5, 2026; 6:00 pm, SLN | | South Dakota | L 42–53 | 9–14 (3–7) | 15 – Watts | 7 – Murrell | 3 – Tied (2) | Hamilton Gymnasium (414); Denver, CO |
| February 7, 2026; 2:00 pm, SLN | | St. Thomas | L 56–60 | 9–15 (3–8) | 13 – Medina | 7 – Monclova | 5 – Watts | Hamilton Gymnasium (440); Denver, CO |
| February 11, 2026; 6:00 pm, Altitude 2/SLN | | Omaha | L 58–65 | 9–16 (3–9) | 25 – Watts | 8 – Murrell | 5 – Baker | Hamilton Gymnasium (369); Denver, CO |
| February 14, 2026; 1:00 pm, SLN | | at Oral Roberts | L 55–76 | 9–17 (3–10) | 15 – Watts | 8 – Murrell | 3 – Monclova | Mabee Center (1,174); Tulsa, OK |
| February 18, 2026; 6:00 pm, SLN | | at Kansas City | W 79–63 | 10–17 (4–10) | 25 – Watts | 6 – Medina | 7 – Watts | Swinney Recreation Center (323); Kansas City, MO |
| February 21, 2026; 1:00 pm, SLN | | South Dakota State | L 55–71 | 10–18 (4–11) | 26 – Watts | 7 – Murrell | 3 – Monclova | Hamilton Gymnasium (632); Denver, CO |
| February 28, 2026; 12:00 pm, SLN | | at Omaha | W 71–50 | 11–18 (5–11) | 23 – Watts | 6 – Medina | 4 – Watts | Baxter Arena (1,136); Omaha, NE |
Summit League tournament
| March 6, 2026; 2:30 pm, SLN | (6) | vs. (3) South Dakota; Quarterfinal | L 50–61 | 11–19 | 13 – Murrell | 5 – Medina | 3 – Tied (3) | Denny Sanford Premier Center (5,315); Sioux Falls, SD |
*Non-conference game. ^{#}Rankings from AP Poll. (#) Tournament seedings in parentheses. All times are in Mountain.
