= 2025–26 North Dakota Fighting Hawks women's basketball team =

American college basketball season

2025–26 North Dakota Fighting Hawks women's basketball
- Conference: Summit League
- Record: 7–24 (3–13 Summit)
- Head coach: Dennis Hutter (1st season)
- Assistant coaches: Alex Kladis; Andi Gayner; Claire Canahuate
- Home arena: Betty Engelstad Sioux Center

2025–26 Summit League women's basketball standings
	Conf.				Overall
Team	W		L	PCT	W		L	PCT
North Dakota State	15	–	1	.938	29	–	5	.853
South Dakota State †	14	–	2	.875	27	–	7	.794
South Dakota	12	–	4	.750	26	–	10	.722
Oral Roberts	8	–	8	.500	15	–	15	.500
St. Thomas	8	–	8	.500	16	–	16	.500
Denver	5	–	11	.313	11	–	19	.367
Kansas City	4	–	12	.250	7	–	23	.233
North Dakota	3	–	13	.188	7	–	24	.226
Omaha	3	–	13	.188	6	–	27	.182
† 2026 Summit League tournament winner

The 2025–26 North Dakota Fighting Hawks women's basketball team represented the University of North Dakota during the 2025–26 NCAA Division I women's basketball season as members of the Summit League. The Fighting Hawks were led by first-year head coach Dennis Hutter and played their home games at the Betty Engelstad Sioux Center in Grand Forks, North Dakota.

The Fighting Hawks finished the season 7–23 overall, and 3–13 in the Summit League to finish in ninth place. In the Summit League tournament, they lost to Omaha in the first round.

== Previous season ==
The Fighting Hawks finished the 2024–25 season 12–19, 6–10 in Summit League play, to finish in a tie for 5th place. They were defeated by South Dakota State in the semifinals of the 2025 Summit League women's basketball tournament.

== Roster ==
2025–26 North Dakota Fighting Hawks women's basketball team
Players
Coaches

Pos.	#	Name	Height	Year	Previous school	Hometown
G	1	Skyler Volmer	5 ft 9 in (1.75 m)	So	Lyman High School	Presho, South Dakota
G	2	Mikayla Aumer	5 ft 9 in (1.75 m)	Sr	Cambridge-Isanti High School	Mora, Minnesota
F	3	Finley Ohnstad	6 ft 1 in (1.85 m)	So	Kansas State	Elko, Minnesota
G	4	Lauren Hillesheim	5 ft 11 in (1.8 m)	Fr	Hopkins High School	Golden Valley, Minnesota
G	5	Mackenzie Hughes	5 ft 5 in (1.65 m)	Sr	Mayville State	Thompson, North Dakota
F	6	Anaiyah Fletcher	6 ft 0 in (1.83 m)	Fr	Bond Academy	Oshawa, Ontario
F	7	Hanna Miller	6 ft 2 in (1.88 m)	Sr	Arizona State	Aberdeen, South Dakota
G	8	Kendra Harvey	5 ft 10 in (1.78 m)	Fr	Byron High School	Byron, Minnesota
G	10	Addison Kolsterbuer	5 ft 11 in (1.8 m)	So	South Dakota	Little Rock, Iowa
G	12	Mataeya Mathern	5 ft 11 in (1.8 m)	So	Edgeley High School	Edgeley, North Dakota
G	13	Lauren Reardon	5 ft 8 in (1.73 m)	Fr	Grand Forks Central High School	Grand Forks, North Dakota
F	14	Ava Miller	6 ft 2 in (1.88 m)	So	USC Upstate	Rochester, Minnesota
G	15	Sydney Piekny	6 ft 0 in (1.83 m)	So	Niagra Prep	Fenwick, Ontario
G	21	London Harris	5 ft 9 in (1.75 m)	Fr	Hopkins High School	Minneapolis, Minnesota
C	24	Walker Demers	6 ft 2 in (1.88 m)	Sr	South Dakota	Grafton, North Dakota
C	33	Miranda VanderWal	6 ft 7 in (2.01 m)	Sr	Southwest Academy	Strathroy, Ontario

Head coach

- Dennis Hutter (Bethel)

Assistant coach(es)

- Alex Kladis (South Carolina)
- Andi Gayner (Mayville State)
- Claire Canahuate (Mayville State)

Legend

- (C) Team captain
- (S) Suspended
- (I) Ineligible
- (W) Walk-on
- Injured
- Current redshirt

Roster
Last update: December 30, 2025

== Schedule and results ==
Date time, TV	Rank^{#}	Opponent^{#}	Result	Record	Site (attendance) city, state
Regular season
November 4, 2025*; 7:00 pm		at Minnesota	L 47–91	0–1	Williams Arena (3,384); Minneapolis, MN
November 7, 2025*; 7:00 pm, SLN		Youngstown State	L 58–65	0–2	Betty Engelstad Sioux Center (1,497); Grand Forks, ND
November 11, 2025*; 6:00 pm		at Green Bay	L 43–67	0–3	Kress Events Center (1,903); Green Bay, WI
November 16, 2025*; 12:00 pm		at Eastern Kentucky	L 46–57	0–4	Baptist Health Arena (281); Richmond, KY
November 18, 2025*; 7:00 pm, SLN		Eastern Kentucky	L 66–87	0–5	Betty Engelstad Sioux Center (1,384); Grand Forks, ND
November 21, 2025*; 12:00 pm, SLN		Wyoming	W 65–45	1–5	Betty Engelstad Sioux Center (2,575); Grand Forks, ND
November 27, 2025*; 2:00 pm, ESPN+		vs. Boise State; Paradise Jam	L 45–65	1–6	UVI Sports and Fitness Center (224); Charlotte Amalie West, U.S. Virgin Islands
November 28, 2025*; 11:30 am, ESPN+		vs. Elon; Paradise Jam	L 57–65	1–7	UVI Sports and Fitness Center; Charlotte Amalie West, U.S. Virgin Islands
December 3, 2025*; 7:00 pm, SLN		Montana; Big Sky–Summit Challenge	L 56–86	1–8	Betty Engelstad Sioux Center (1,375); Grand Forks, ND
December 6, 2025*; 7:00 pm, ESPN+		at Montana State; Big Sky–Summit Challenge	L 57–99	1–9	Brick Breeden Fieldhouse (1,877); Bozeman, MT
December 14, 2025*; 12:00 pm, SLN		Western Kentucky	L 50–80	1–10	Betty Engelstad Sioux Center (1,318); Grand Forks, ND
December 17, 2025*; 7:00 pm, SLN		Mayville State	W 79–30	2–10	Betty Engelstad Sioux Center (1,451); Grand Forks, ND
December 20, 2025*; 1:00 pm, SLN		Dickinson State	W 65–46	3–10	Betty Engelstad Sioux Center (1,337); Grand Forks, ND
January 1, 2026; 3:00 pm, SLN		at Denver	L 57–64	3–11 (0–1)	Hamilton Gymnasium (575); Denver, CO
January 3, 2026; 2:00 pm, SLN		at Oral Roberts	L 67–95	3–12 (0–2)	Mabee Center (993); Tulsa, OK
January 8, 2026; 7:00 pm, SLN		Omaha	W 75–54	4–12 (1–2)	Betty Engelstad Sioux Center (1,386); Grand Forks, ND
January 10, 2026; 1:00 pm, SLN		Kansas City	L 56–77	4–13 (1–3)	Betty Engelstad Sioux Center (1,378); Grand Forks, ND
January 14, 2026; 7:00 pm, SLN		at South Dakota	L 39–62	4–14 (1–4)	Sanford Coyote Sports Center (1,232); Vermillion, SD
January 21, 2026; 7:00 pm, SLN		South Dakota State	L 47–99	4–15 (1–5)	Betty Engelstad Sioux Center (1,531); Grand Forks, ND
January 24, 2026; 2:00 pm, SLN		at St. Thomas	L 54–72	4–16 (1–6)	Lee & Penny Anderson Arena (654); St. Paul, MN
January 29, 2026; 7:00 pm, SLN		Oral Roberts	L 80–89	4–17 (1–7)	Betty Engelstad Sioux Center (1,488); Grand Forks, ND
January 31, 2026; 1:00 pm, SLN		Denver	W 73–72	5–17 (2–7)	Betty Engelstad Sioux Center (1,511); Grand Forks, ND
February 1, 2026*; 1:00 pm, SLN		Bismarck State; Rescheduled from December 9, 2025	W 89–80	6–17	Betty Engelstad Sioux Center (1,425); Grand Forks, ND
February 5, 2026; 6:30 pm, SLN		at Omaha	L 54–58	6–18 (2–8)	Baxter Arena (679); Omaha, NE
February 7, 2026; 2:00 pm, SLN		at Kansas City	W 68–58	7–18 (3–8)	Swinney Recreation Center (437); Kansas City, MO
February 12, 2026; 7:00 pm, SLN		at South Dakota State	L 48–94	7–19 (3–9)	First Bank and Trust Arena (2,457); Brookings, SD
February 15, 2026; 1:00 pm, SLN		North Dakota State	L 51–87	7–20 (3–10)	Betty Engelstad Sioux Center (2,019); Grand Forks, ND
February 21, 2026; 1:00 pm, SLN		St. Thomas	L 58–70	7–21 (3–11)	Betty Engelstad Sioux Center (1,519); Grand Forks, ND
February 26, 2026; 7:00 pm, SLN		South Dakota	L 66–80	7–22 (3–12)	Betty Engelstad Sioux Center (1,452); Grand Forks, ND
February 28, 2026; 1:00 pm, SLN		at North Dakota State	L 70–95	7–23 (3–13)	Scheels Center; Fargo, ND
Summit League tournament
March 4, 2026*; 4:30 pm, SLN	(9)	vs. (8) Omaha; First round	L 39–49	7–24	Denny Sanford Premier Center (3,675); Sioux Falls, SD
*Non-conference game. ^{#}Rankings from AP poll. (#) Tournament seedings in parentheses. All times are in Central.
