= 2025–26 Kansas City Roos women's basketball team =

American college basketball season

2025–26 Kansas City Roos women's basketball
- Conference: Summit League
- Record: 7–23 (4–12 Summit)
- Head coach: Dionnah Jackson-Durrett (4th season)
- Associate head coach: Wanika Owsley
- Assistant coaches: Stacy Stephens; La'Karis Salter; Sammy Smith
- Home arena: Swinney Recreation Center

2025–26 Summit League women's basketball standings
| | Conf. | | | | Overall |
| Team | W | | L | PCT | W | | L | PCT |
|---|---|---|---|---|---|---|---|---|
| North Dakota State | 15 | – | 1 | .938 | 29 | – | 5 | .853 |
| South Dakota State † | 14 | – | 2 | .875 | 27 | – | 7 | .794 |
| South Dakota | 12 | – | 4 | .750 | 26 | – | 10 | .722 |
| Oral Roberts | 8 | – | 8 | .500 | 15 | – | 15 | .500 |
| St. Thomas | 8 | – | 8 | .500 | 16 | – | 16 | .500 |
| Denver | 5 | – | 11 | .313 | 11 | – | 19 | .367 |
| Kansas City | 4 | – | 12 | .250 | 7 | – | 23 | .233 |
| North Dakota | 3 | – | 13 | .188 | 7 | – | 24 | .226 |
| Omaha | 3 | – | 13 | .188 | 6 | – | 27 | .182 |
† 2026 Summit League tournament winner

The 2025–26 Kansas City Roos women's basketball team represented the University of Missouri–Kansas City during the 2025–26 NCAA Division I women's basketball season. The Roos, who were led by fourth-year head coach Dionnah Jackson-Durrett, played their home games at the Swinney Recreation Center in Kansas City, Missouri as members of the Summit League.

The Roos finished the regular season 7–22 overall, and 4–12 in the Summit League to finish in seventh place. In the Summit League tournament, they lost to South Dakota State in the quarterfinals.

== Previous season ==
The Roos finished the 2024–25 season 10–21, 6–10 in Summit League play, to finish in a tie for fifth place. They upset #3 seed North Dakota State, before falling to eventual tournament runner-up Oral Roberts in the semifinals of the Summit League tournament.

== Roster ==
2025–26 Kansas City Roos women's basketball team
Players
Coaches

| Pos. | # | Name | Height | Year | Previous school | Hometown |
|---|---|---|---|---|---|---|
| G | 0 | Emani Bennett | 5 ft 11 in (1.8 m) | Jr | Lee's Summit North High School | Lee's Summit, Missouri |
| G | 1 | Nikole Thomas | 5 ft 9 in (1.75 m) | RS So | Memphis | Memphis, Tennessee |
| G | 2 | Elauni Bennett | 5 ft 9 in (1.75 m) | Jr | Lee's Summit North High School | Lee's Summit, Missouri |
| G | 3 | Lailah Hatcher | 5 ft 7 in (1.7 m) | Fr | Link Academy | Kansas City, Missouri |
| G | 5 | Tierra Trotter | 5 ft 4 in (1.63 m) | GS | UT Rio Grande Valley | Pine Bluff, Arkansas |
| F | 10 | Funmi Amode | 6 ft 0 in (1.83 m) | Sr | Salt Lake Community College | London, England |
| F | 11 | Kelby Bannerman | 6 ft 1 in (1.85 m) | GS | Davidson | Hampshire, Illinois |
| F | 12 | Claudia Frances | 5 ft 11 in (1.8 m) | Fr | I.E.S. Font de Sant Lluís | Valencia, Spain |
| G | 13 | Carleigh Andrews | 5 ft 7 in (1.7 m) | Sr | Palm Beach Atlantic | Tuscaloosa, Alabama |
| F | 22 | Jumoke Adaramoye | 6 ft 1 in (1.85 m) | GS | Saint Leo | Ekiti, Nigeria |
| G | 23 | Alyssa Febres | 5 ft 5 in (1.65 m) | So | Monsignor Scanlan High School | Yonkers, New York |
| G | 24 | Zaire Harrell | 5 ft 8 in (1.73 m) | Sr | MICDS | St. Louis, Missouri |
| G | 25 | Jamyah Winter | 5 ft 11 in (1.8 m) | GS | Lincoln Memorial | Milan, Illinois |
| G | 33 | Hallie Majoros | 5 ft 9 in (1.75 m) | GS | Milwaukee | Sagamore Hills, Ohio |
| G | 44 | Trinity Chears | 5 ft 5 in (1.65 m) | So | Texas A&M International | South Holland, Illinois |

Head coach

- Dionnah Jackson-Durrett (Oklahoma)

Assistant coach(es)

- Wanika Owsley (Southeast Missouri State)
- Stacy Stephens (Texas)
- La'Karis Salter (Mississippi)
- Sammy Smith (Texas A&M)

Legend

- (C) Team captain
- (S) Suspended
- (I) Ineligible
- (W) Walk-on
- Injured
- Current redshirt

Roster
Last update: February 2, 2026

== Schedule and results ==
| Date time, TV | Rank^{#} | Opponent^{#} | Result | Record | High points | High rebounds | High assists | Site (attendance) city, state |
Exhibition
| October 31, 2025*; 6:00 pm | | Missouri Baptist | W 78–39 | – | – | – | – | Swinney Recreation Center; Kansas City, MO |
Non-conference regular season
| November 5, 2025*; 6:30 pm, ESPN+ | | at Kansas | L 64–74 | 0–1 | 29 – Em. Bennett | 14 – Harrell | 7 – Trotter | Allen Fieldhouse (3,581); Lawrence, KS |
| November 8, 2025*; 2:00 pm, SLN | | William Jewell | W 90–35 | 1–1 | 23 – Em. Bennett | 14 – El. Bennett | 5 – Febres | Swinney Recreation Center (271); Kansas City, MO |
| November 12, 2025*; 8:00 pm, ESPN+ | | at No. 6 Oklahoma | L 61–89 | 1–2 | 19 – El. Bennett | 8 – El. Bennett | 4 – Trotter | Lloyd Noble Center (4,049); Norman, OK |
| November 17, 2025*; 6:00 pm, ESPN+ | | at Lindenwood | L 71–80 | 1–3 | 26 – El. Bennett | 8 – El. Bennett | 6 – Febres | Robert F. Hyland Arena (634); St. Charles, MO |
| November 20, 2025*; 12:00 pm, SLN | | Hesston | W 121−43 | 2−3 | 28 – Bannerman | 9 – Bannerman | 9 – Hatcher | Swinney Recreation Center (925); Kansas City, MO |
| November 25, 2025*; 7:00 pm, SLN | | UTEP | L 64−75 | 2−4 | 16 – Em. Bennett | 7 – Harrell | 4 – Harrell | Swinney Recreation Center (283); Kansas City, MO |
| November 29, 2025*; 2:00 pm, SLN | | Austin Peay | L 46–66 | 2–5 | 15 – El. Bennett | 7 – Harrell | 5 – Trotter | Swinney Recreation Center (259); Kansas City, MO |
| December 3, 2025*; 7:00 pm, ESPN+ | | at Northern Colorado; Big Sky–Summit Challenge | L 59–72 | 2–6 | 13 – Winter | 10 – El. Bennett | 3 – Tied | Bank of Colorado Arena (510); Greeley, CO |
| December 6, 2025*; 2:00 pm, SLN | | Portland State; Big Sky–Summit Challenge | L 79–85 ^{OT} | 2–7 | 27 – Em. Bennett | 7 – Adaramoye | 3 – Tied | Swinney Recreation Center (225); Kansas City, MO |
| December 13, 2025*; 1:00 pm, SLN | | Utah Valley | L 58–64 | 2–8 | 27 – Em. Bennett | 15 – Amode | 3 – Harrell | Swinney Recreation Center (301); Kansas City, MO |
| December 17, 2025*; 6:30 pm, SECN+ | | at Arkansas | L 77–92 | 2–9 | 18 – Tied | 10 – Harrell | 7 – Harrell | Bud Walton Arena (2,036); Fayetteville, AR |
| December 20, 2025*; 2:00 pm, SLN | | Haskell Indian Nations | W 109−59 | 3−9 | 27 – El. Bennett | 15 – El. Bennett | 7 – Febres | Swinney Recreation Center (225); Kansas City, MO |
| December 28, 2025*; 2:00 pm, SECN+ | | at Missouri | L 67–71 | 3–10 | 21 – Trotter | 11 – Em. Bennett | 2 – Tied | Mizzou Arena (2,950); Columbia, MO |
Summit League regular season
| December 31, 2025; 5:00 pm, SLN | | Omaha | W 61–59 | 4–10 (1–0) | 18 – El. Bennett | 10 – El. Bennett | 6 – Trotter | Swinney Recreation Center (269); Kansas City, MO |
| January 3, 2026; 2:00 pm, SLN | | South Dakota | L 47–67 | 4–11 (1–1) | 10 – Bannerman | 7 – El. Bennett | 3 – Trotter | Swinney Recreation Center (351); Kansas City, MO |
| January 8, 2026; 7:00 pm, SLN | | at North Dakota State | L 54–77 | 4–12 (1–2) | 14 – El. Bennett | 8 – El. Bennett | 2 – Trotter | Scheels Center (887); Fargo, ND |
| January 10, 2026; 1:00 pm, SLN | | at North Dakota | W 77–56 | 5–12 (2–2) | 22 – Harrell | 9 – Harrell | 5 – Febres | Betty Engelstad Sioux Center (1,378); Grand Forks, ND |
| January 15, 2026; 7:00 pm, SLN | | at Oral Roberts | L 65–81 | 5–13 (2–3) | 20 – El. Bennett | 12 – El. Bennett | 5 – Febres | Mabee Center (791); Tulsa, OK |
| January 17, 2026; 1:00 pm, SLN | | St. Thomas | W 75–60 | 6–13 (3–3) | 20 – El. Bennett | 10 – Tied | 4 – Tied | Swinney Recreation Center (304); Kansas City, MO |
| January 21, 2026; 7:00 pm, SLN | | at Denver | L 54–64 | 6–14 (3–4) | 14 – Em. Bennett | 10 – Bannerman | 2 – Trotter | Hamilton Gymnasium (372); Denver, CO |
| January 24, 2026; 2:00 pm, SLN | | South Dakota State | L 63–76 | 6–15 (3–5) | 21 – Em. Bennett | 6 – El. Bennett | 7 – Trotter | Swinney Recreation Center (224); Kansas City, MO |
| January 31, 2026; 1:00 pm, SLN | | at Omaha | W 60–59 | 7–15 (4–5) | 19 – Trotter | 9 – Bannerman | 3 – Tied | Baxter Arena (1,221); Omaha, NE |
| February 5, 2026; 7:00 pm, SLN | | North Dakota State | L 49–74 | 7–16 (4–6) | 9 – Tied (2) | 5 – Em. Bennett | 2 – Harrell | Swinney Recreation Center (351); Kansas City, MO |
| February 7, 2026; 2:00 pm, SLN | | North Dakota | L 58–68 | 7–17 (4–7) | 13 – Em. Bennett | 11 – El. Bennett | 4 – Trotter | Swinney Recreation Center (437); Kansas City, MO |
| February 12, 2026; 7:00 pm, SLN | | at South Dakota | L 65–70 ^{OT} | 7–18 (4–8) | 20 – Trotter | 9 – El. Bennett | 6 – Trotter | Sanford Coyote Sports Center; Vermillion, SD |
| February 14, 2026; 2:00 pm, SLN | | at South Dakota State | L 40–93 | 7–19 (4–9) | 14 – Em. Bennett | 8 – El. Bennett | 2 – Harrell | First Bank and Trust Arena (2,897); Brookings, SD |
| February 18, 2026; 7:00 pm, SLN | | Denver | L 63–79 | 7–20 (4–10) | 20 – Em. Bennett | 11 – El. Bennett | 6 – Trotter | Swinney Recreation Center (323); Kansas City, MO |
| February 21, 2026; 2:00 pm, SLN | | Oral Roberts | L 68–70 | 7–21 (4–11) | 20 – Trotter | 14 – Harrell | 3 – Bannerman | Swinney Recreation Center (478); Kansas City, MO |
| February 25, 2026; 7:00 pm, SLN | | at St. Thomas | L 71–73 | 7–22 (4–12) | 22 – El. Bennett | 16 – El. Bennett | 7 – Febres | Lee & Penny Anderson Arena (705); St. Paul, MN |
Summit League tournament
| March 5, 2026*; 12:00 pm, SLN | (7) | vs. (2) South Dakota State; Quarterfinal | L 61–75 | 7–23 | 15 – Tied (2) | 9 – El. Bennett | 4 – Tied (2) | Denny Sanford Premier Center (6,176); Sioux Falls, SD |
*Non-conference game. ^{#}Rankings from AP Poll. (#) Tournament seedings in parentheses. All times are in Central.
