= 2026 Summit League women's basketball tournament =

American college basketball postseason tournament

- Classification: Division I
- Season: 2025–26
- Teams: 9
- Site: Denny Sanford Premier Center; Sioux Falls, South Dakota
- Champions: South Dakota State (13th title)
- Winning coach: Aaron Johnston (13th title)
- MVP: Brooklyn Meyer (SDSU)
- Attendance: 31,572 (overall); 7,930 (championship)
- Television: Summit League Network, CBSSN

2025–26 Summit League women's basketball standings
| | Conf. | | | | Overall |
| Team | W | | L | PCT | W | | L | PCT |
|---|---|---|---|---|---|---|---|---|
| North Dakota State | 15 | – | 1 | .938 | 29 | – | 5 | .853 |
| South Dakota State † | 14 | – | 2 | .875 | 27 | – | 7 | .794 |
| South Dakota | 12 | – | 4 | .750 | 26 | – | 10 | .722 |
| Oral Roberts | 8 | – | 8 | .500 | 15 | – | 15 | .500 |
| St. Thomas | 8 | – | 8 | .500 | 16 | – | 16 | .500 |
| Denver | 5 | – | 11 | .313 | 11 | – | 19 | .367 |
| Kansas City | 4 | – | 12 | .250 | 7 | – | 23 | .233 |
| North Dakota | 3 | – | 13 | .188 | 7 | – | 24 | .226 |
| Omaha | 3 | – | 13 | .188 | 6 | – | 27 | .182 |
† 2026 Summit League tournament winner

The 2026 Summit League women's basketball tournament was the postseason women's college basketball tournament for the Summit League for the 2025–26 season. All tournament games were played at the Denny Sanford Premier Center in Sioux Falls, South Dakota, from March 4–8, 2026.

Defending champions South Dakota State defeated regular season champions North Dakota State in the championship game, claiming their 4th consecutive Summit League title and 13th overall.

== Seeds ==
All nine conference teams will participate in the tournament. Teams will be seeded by conference record. If teams are tied at the conclusion of conference play, the following tiebreakers will be used in this order:

1. Head-to-head record
2. Record against the highest-seeded team not involved in the tie, going down through the standings until the tie is broken

| Seed | School | Conf. record | Tiebreaker(s) |
|---|---|---|---|
| 1 | North Dakota State | 15–1 | |
| 2 | South Dakota State | 14–2 | |
| 3 | South Dakota | 12–4 | |
| 4 | Oral Roberts | 8–8 | 1–1 vs. South Dakota |
| 5 | St. Thomas | 8–8 | 0–2 vs. South Dakota |
| 6 | Denver | 5–11 | |
| 7 | Kansas City | 4–12 | |
| 8 | Omaha | 3–13 | 1–1 vs. Oral Roberts |
| 9 | North Dakota | 3–13 | 0–2 vs. Oral Roberts |

== Schedule and results ==
| Game | Time | Matchup | Score | Attendance | Television |
First Round – Wednesday, March 4
| 1 | 4:30 pm | No. 8 Omaha vs. No. 9 North Dakota | 49–39 | 3,675 | MidcoSN/Summit League Network |
Quarterfinals – Thursday, March 5
| 2 | 12:00 pm | No. 2 South Dakota State vs. No. 7 Kansas City | 75–61 | 6,176 | MidcoSN/Summit League Network |
| 3 | 2:33 pm | No. 1 North Dakota State vs. No. 8 Omaha | 87–37 | 6,176 | MidcoSN/Summit League Network |
Quarterfinals – Friday, March 6
| 4 | 12:00 pm | No. 4 Oral Roberts vs. No. 5 St. Thomas | 81–54 | 5,315 | MidcoSN/Summit League Network |
| 5 | 2:35 pm | No. 3 South Dakota vs. No. 6 Denver | 61–50 | 5,315 | MidcoSN/Summit League Network |
Semifinals – Saturday, March 7
| 6 | 12:00 pm | No. 1 North Dakota State vs. No. 5 St. Thomas | 63–51 | 8,476 | MidcoSN/Summit League Network |
| 7 | 2:35 pm | No. 2 South Dakota State vs. No. 3 South Dakota | 74–59 | 8,476 | MidcoSN/Summit League Network |
Championship – Sunday, March 8
| 8 | 3:15 pm | No. 1 North Dakota State vs. No. 2 South Dakota State | 64–51 | 7,930 | CBSSN |
*Game times in CST through the semifinals and CDT for the championship. Rankings denote tournament seed. Reference:

== Bracket ==
First Round; March 4 Summit League Network
8 | Omaha | 49
9 | North Dakota | 39

Quarterfinals; March 5 & 6 Summit League Network
1 | North Dakota State | 87
8 | Omaha | 37
4 | Oral Roberts | 54
5 | St. Thomas | 81
2 | South Dakota State | 75
7 | Kansas City | 61
3 | South Dakota | 61
6 | Denver | 50

Semifinals; March 7 Summit League Network
1 | North Dakota State | 63
5 | St. Thomas | 51
2 | South Dakota State | 74
3 | South Dakota | 59

Championship; March 8 CBS Sports Network
1 | North Dakota State | 51
2 | South Dakota State | 64

== All–Tournament Team ==
The following players were named to the All–Tournament Team:

| Player | School |
|---|---|
| Brooklyn Meyer (MVP) | South Dakota State |
| Madison Mathiowetz | South Dakota State |
| Avery Koenen | North Dakota State |
| Angelina Robles | South Dakota |
| Alyssa Sand | St. Thomas |

== See also ==
- 2026 Summit League men's basketball tournament
