= Ruth Sinn =

American basketball coach (born 1962)

Personal information
- Born: April 29, 1962 (age 64) North St. Paul, Minnesota, U.S.

Career information
- High school: North (North St. Paul, Minnesota)
- College: St. Thomas (MN) (1980–1984)
- Coaching career: 1988–2026

Career history

Coaching
- 1988–2005: Apple Valley HS
- 2005–2026: St. Thomas (MN)

Career highlights
- As player: 2× All-MIAC (1983, 1984); As head coach: 9× MIAC Tournament champion (2010–2019); 4× MIAC Coach of the Year (2008, 2012, 2015, 2017)

Ruth Ann Opatz Sinn (née Opatz; born April 29, 1962) is a retired American basketball coach, most recently the head women's basketball head coach at St. Thomas (Minnesota). Sinn had coached the program from 2005 to 2026. Sinn was previously head coach at Apple Valley High School for 17 years.

== College career ==
Sinn played for St. Thomas from 1980 to 1984 and graduated in 1984. As a player, Sinn earned All-MIAC honors in 1983 and 1984, was team captain as a senior, and MIAC champion in her junior and senior years. At the time, St. Thomas competed in NCAA Division III.

== USA Basketball ==
Sinn was an assistant coach for Team USA during the 2019 FIBA Under-16 Women's Americas Championship. At the 2019 championships in Puerto Aysen, Chile, Sinn helped Team USA to a perfect 6–0 record and the gold medal.

== Coaching career ==
Sinn was head coach at Apple Valley High School in Minnesota for 17 seasons from 1988 until 2005. Her Apple Valley team played in three state tourneys and won eight section titles during her tenure as coach. Sinn compiled a 290–170 record during her high school coaching career.

In 2005, Sinn made the move to NCAA Division III college basketball as head coach of the St. Thomas Tommies women’s program. At the DIII level, Sinn led the Tommies to a 355–88 (0.801) overall record from 2005 to 2021 when the Tommies left the DIII ranks.

During her tenure, the Tommies were highly successful as a DIII program, making the Final Four at the NCAA Division III women's basketball tournament in 2012, 2017, and 2019.

For the 2021–22 season, the Tommies moved up to NCAA Division I college basketball, competing in the Summit League. As of the conclusion of the 2024–25 season, Sinn had compiled a 52–67 record as a DI head coach.

On February 10, 2026, Sinn announced her retirement at the end of the 2025–26 season.
