= Scheels Center =

Arena in Fargo, North Dakota

Coordinates: 46°54′1.59″N 96°47′56.49″W

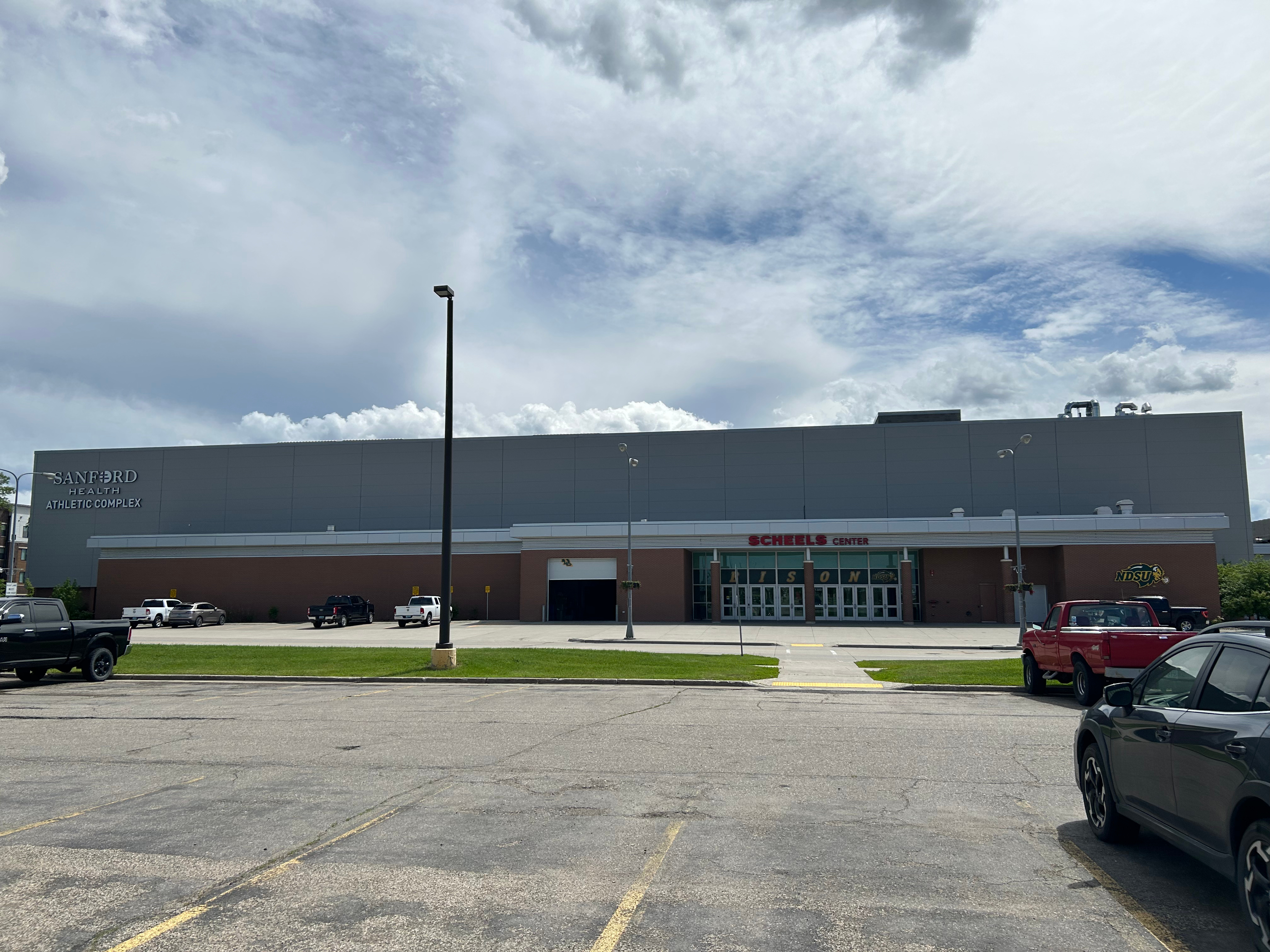

- Location in the United States Location in North Dakota
- Interactive map of Scheels Center
- Full name: Scheels Center inside the Sanford Health Athletic Complex
- Address: 1600 University Dr N
- Location: North Dakota State University; Fargo, North Dakota, U.S.
- Owner: North Dakota State University
- Capacity: 5,460
- Surface: Multi-surface

Construction
- Groundbreaking: January 1970; Renovation: March 1, 2014
- Opened: October 1970; 56 years ago Renovation: November 11, 2016; 9 years ago
- Cost: $50 million ($67.1 million in 2025)
- Architects: T.L. Stroh Architects; 360 Architecture of Kansas City
- General contractor: Gast Construction of Fargo

Tenant
- North Dakota State Bison (NCAA) (2016–present)

Scheels Center is a 5,460 seat multi-purpose arena in Fargo, North Dakota. It was built in 1970 and was home to the North Dakota State University Bison basketball and wrestling teams through the 2013–14 season. It was previously named the Bison Sports Arena. The main facility was renamed the Sanford Health Athletic Complex and the basketball arena was renamed the Scheels Center. It reopened under the new name for the 2016–17 season.

== Main Renovation ==
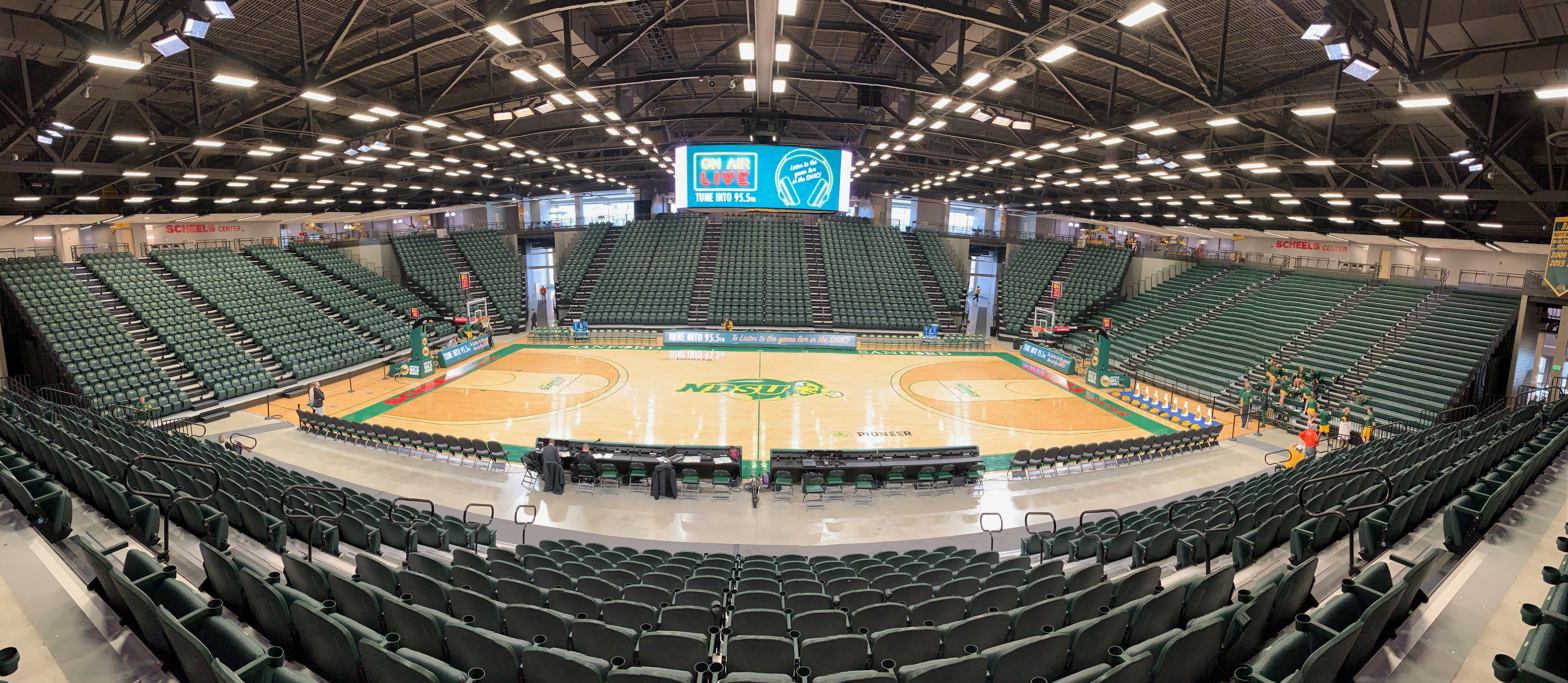
View from West sideline.

Fundraising was launched as part of the Edge Campaign to privately raise money for the extension and renovation of the Bison Sports Arena. On October 11, 2013, the NDSU Foundation voted unanimously to back the project up to $41 million, pending legislative approval. On November 23, 2013, the State Board Of Higher Education unanimously approved the project. On December 11, 2013, the project was unanimously approved.

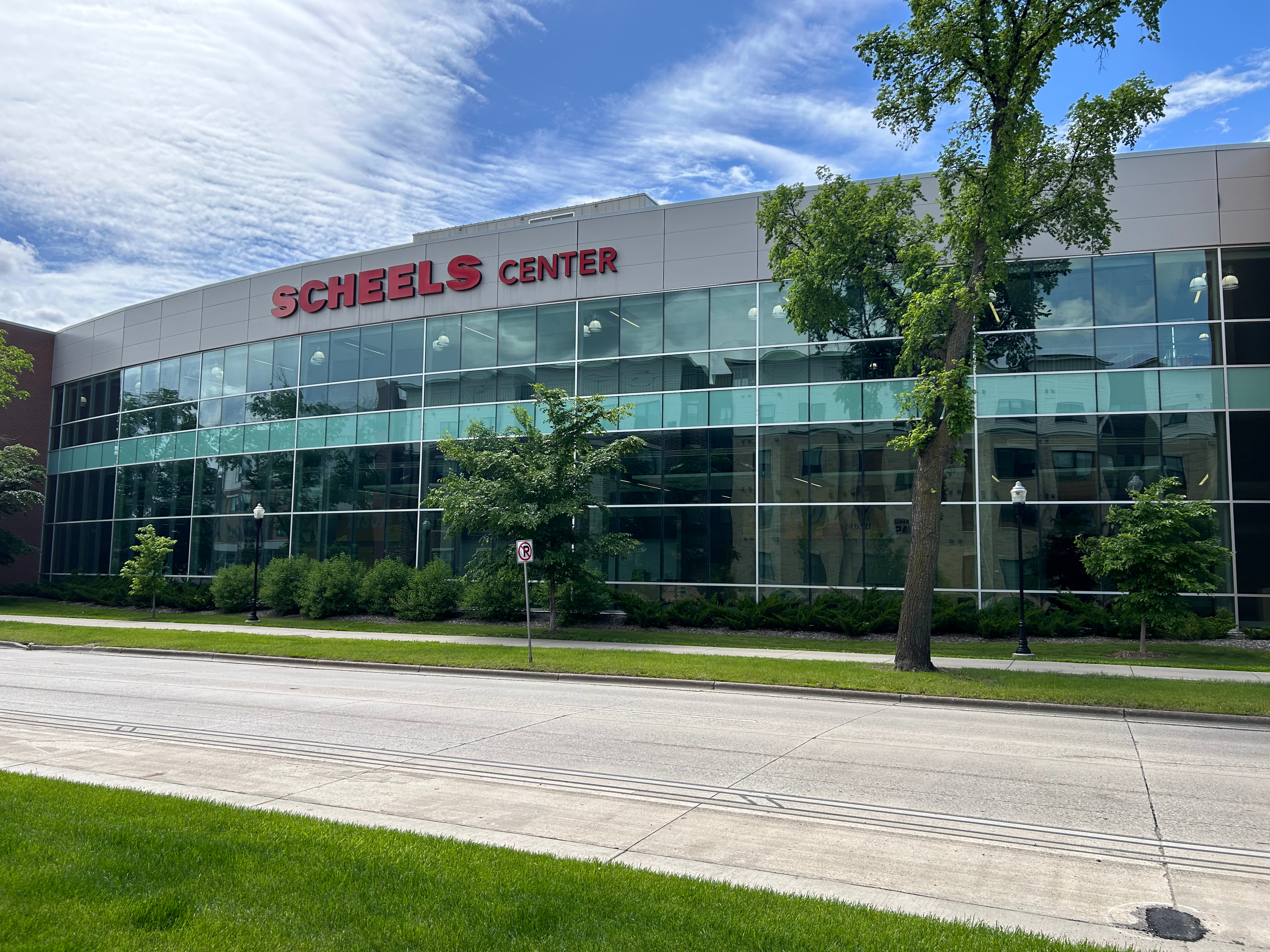
View from the Eastside.

The renovation included:

- Scheels Center basketball arena
- Shelly Ellig indoor track and field facility
- 14,500 sq ft (1,350 m^{2}) basketball training facility
- 15,000 sq ft (1,400 m^{2}) performance training center
- 2,000 sq ft (190 m^{2}) Hall of Fame display
- team store
- ticket office
- Student Athlete Academic Center
- New 4 sided HD video board will be installed.

The entire Sanford Health Athletic Complex project was completed in November 2016. The Scheels Center officially opened on November 11, 2016, when the North Dakota State men's basketball team opened their season against Arkansas State in a game that the Bison won, 76–66.

== Venue firsts ==
Only firsts since the SHAC renovation was completed

=== Men's Basketball ===
First game: November 11, 2016 vs. Arkansas State
First win: November 11, 2016 vs. Arkansas State (76–66)
First loss: December 7, 2016 vs. North Dakota (56–74)
First conference win: December 31, 2016 vs. Omaha (82–70)
First conference loss: February 4, 2017 vs. South Dakota (66–76)

=== Women's Basketball ===
First game: November 12, 2016 vs. Dickinson State
First win: November 12, 2016 vs. Dickinson State (70–63)
First loss: November 22, 2016 vs. Colorado (59–76)
First conference win: January 4, 2017 vs. South Dakota (83–73)
First conference loss: December 28, 2016 vs. South Dakota State (66–69)

=== Wrestling ===
First duel: November 6, 2016 vs. #14 Iowa State
First duel win: November 6, 2016 vs. #14 Iowa State (25–16)
First duel loss: February 3, 2017 vs. Utah Valley (16–22)
First conference duel win: November 6, 2016 vs. #14 Iowa State (25–16)
First conference duel loss: February 3, 2017 vs. Utah Valley (16–22)

== See also ==
- List of NCAA Division I basketball arenas
