= 2025–26 Northern Colorado Bears women's basketball team =

American college basketball season

2025–26 Northern Colorado Bears women's basketball
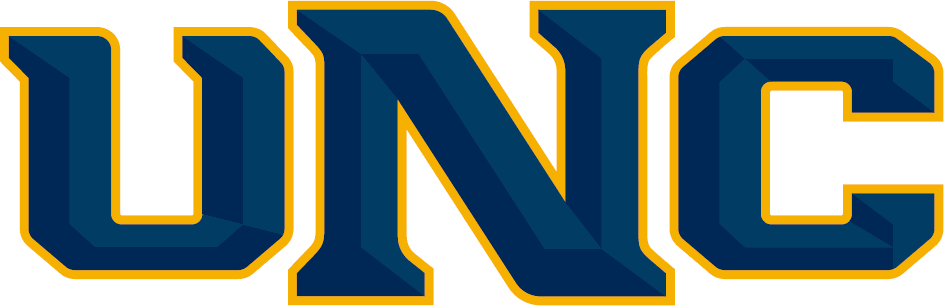

WNIT, Second Round
- Conference: Big Sky Conference
- Record: 23–11 (13–5 Big Sky)
- Head coach: Kristen Mattio (5th season)
- Associate head coach: Camille Perkins
- Assistant coaches: Jerad Stottlemyre; Katie Bussey Mayes; DeAndre Betty
- Home arena: Bank of Colorado Arena

2025–26 Big Sky women's basketball standings
	Conf.				Overall
Team	W		L	PCT	W		L	PCT
Idaho †	17	–	1	.944	29	–	6	.829
Montana State	16	–	2	.889	27	–	8	.771
Northern Colorado	13	–	5	.722	23	–	11	.676
Idaho State	12	–	6	.667	19	–	11	.633
Sacramento State	8	–	10	.444	15	–	18	.455
Eastern Washington	7	–	11	.389	15	–	18	.455
Northern Arizona	6	–	12	.333	10	–	22	.313
Montana	5	–	13	.278	9	–	22	.290
Weber State	4	–	14	.222	11	–	22	.333
Portland State	2	–	16	.111	6	–	25	.194
† 2026 Big Sky tournament winner

The 2025–26 Northern Colorado Bears women's basketball team represents the University of Northern Colorado during the 2025–26 NCAA Division I women's basketball season. The Bears, led by fifth-year head coach Kristen Mattio, play their home games at the Bank of Colorado Arena in Greeley, Colorado as members of the Big Sky Conference.

== Previous season ==
The Bears finished the 2024–25 season 14–17, 6–12 in Big Sky play, to finish in ninth place. They defeated Portland State, before falling to top-seeded and eventual tournament champions Montana State in the quarterfinals of the Big Sky tournament.

== Preseason ==
On October 22, 2025, the Big Sky Conference released their preseason coaches and media poll. Northern Colorado was picked to finish seventh in the coaches poll, and ninth in the media poll.

=== Preseason rankings ===
Big Sky Preseason Coaches' Poll
Place	Team	Votes
1	Montana State	74 (5)
2	Montana	72 (3)
3	Idaho	65 (1)
4	Idaho State	57 (1)
5	Sacramento State	50
6	Eastern Washington	38
7	Northern Colorado	36
8	Weber State	28
T-9	Northern Arizona	15
T-9	Portland State	15
(#) first-place votes

Big Sky Preseason Media Poll
Place	Team	Votes
1	Montana State	238 (11)
2	Montana	224 (7)
3	Idaho	220 (7)
4	Sacramento State	177 (2)
5	Idaho State	161
6	Eastern Washington	123
7	Weber State	120
8	Northern Arizona	102
9	Northern Colorado	86
10	Portland State	34
(#) first-place votes

=== Preseason All-Big Sky Team ===
No players were named to the All-Big Sky Team.

== Roster ==
2025–26 Northern Colorado Bears women's basketball team
Players
Coaches

Pos.	#	Name	Height	Year	Previous school	Hometown
G	0	Olivia Loomis-Goltl	5 ft 10 in (1.78 m)	So	Bridgeport High School	Bridgeport, Nebraska
G	2	Heather Baymon	5 ft 8 in (1.73 m)	So	Texas State	Phoenix, Arizona
F	4	Claire Fraser	6 ft 0 in (1.83 m)	So	Brisbane State High School	Brisbane, Australia
G	5	Neenah George	5 ft 8 in (1.73 m)	So	Legion Prep	Dallas, Texas
F	8	Erin Powell	6 ft 0 in (1.83 m)	So	Colorado	Hampshire, England
F	10	Louise Dykstra	6 ft 2 in (1.88 m)	So	Sir Winston Churchill Secondary School	Vancouver, British Columbia
F	11	Lilah Moore	5 ft 10 in (1.78 m)	Sr	Pinnacle High School	Phoenix, Arizona
F	12	Ruthie Loomis-Goltl	6 ft 3 in (1.91 m)	So	South Dakota	Bridgeport, Nebraska
G	13	Lele Tanuvasa	6 ft 0 in (1.83 m)	So	USC Upstate	Eureka, California
G	15	Gabi Fields	5 ft 5 in (1.65 m)	Sr	Brownfield High School	Brownfield, Texas
F	22	Aniah Hall	6 ft 3 in (1.91 m)	Sr	Temple High School	Temple, Texas
F	24	Tatum West	6 ft 2 in (1.88 m)	Jr	Crandall High School	Combine, Texas
G	33	Julia Riley	6 ft 1 in (1.85 m)	Sr	Cal State Bakersfield	Granite Bay, California

Head coach

- Kristen Mattio (Evangel)

Assistant coach(es)

- Camille Perkins (Angelo State)
- Jerad Stottlemyre (Washington)
- Katie Bussey Mayes (Montana State)
- DeAndre Betty (Arizona State)

Legend

- (C) Team captain
- (S) Suspended
- (I) Ineligible
- (W) Walk-on
- Injured
- Current redshirt

Roster
Last update: January 29, 2026

== Schedule and results ==
Date time, TV	Rank^{#}	Opponent^{#}	Result	Record	High points	High rebounds	High assists	Site (attendance) city, state
Non-conference regular season
November 4, 2025*; 6:00 pm, ESPN+		Northern New Mexico	W 105–31	1–0	21 – Baymon	11 – West	6 – Fields	Bank of Colorado Arena (578); Greeley, CO
November 8, 2025*; 2:00 pm, ESPN+		Lamar	W 72–68 ^{OT}	2–0	26 – George	7 – West	4 – Fields	Bank of Colorado Arena (650); Greeley, CO
November 11, 2025*; 6:00 pm, ESPN+		Bethany (KS)	W 84–52	3–0	14 – Baymon	7 – West	4 – Tied	Bank of Colorado Arena (569); Greeley, CO
November 14, 2025*; 6:00 pm, ESPN+		Denver	L 53–56	3–1	16 – Hall	10 – West	4 – George	Bank of Colorado Arena (730); Greeley, CO
November 21, 2025*; 2:00 pm		vs. Campbell; WellNow Blue Demon Classic	W 68−62 ^{OT}	4−1	20 – Hall	10 – Hall	5 – Fields	Wintrust Arena; Chicago, IL
November 22, 2025*; 4:30 pm, ESPN+		at DePaul; WellNow Blue Demon Classic	W 61−60	5−1	13 – Tied	10 – West	5 – George	Wintrust Arena (973); Chicago, IL
November 25, 2025*; 6:00 pm, ESPN+		at Arizona	L 58–84	5–2	19 – George	8 – West	3 – George	McKale Center (5,251); Tucson, AZ
November 28, 2025*; 6:00 pm, ESPN+		Chadron State	W 114–47	6–2	23 – Baymon	10 – West	8 – Fields	Bank of Colorado Arena (678); Greeley, CO
December 3, 2025*; 6:00 pm, ESPN+		Kansas City; Big Sky - Summit Challenge	W 72–59	7–2	18 – West	14 – West	4 – George	Bank of Colorado Arena (510); Greeley, CO
December 6, 2025*; 12:00 pm, SLN		at Omaha; Big Sky - Summit Challenge	W 71–60	8–2	17 – Riley	11 – West	4 – George	Baxter Arena (693); Omaha, NE
December 16, 2025*; 7:00 pm, ESPN+		at Colorado	L 62–79	8–3	13 – Tied	5 – West	2 – Tied	CU Events Center (1,782); Boulder, CO
December 20, 2025*; 3:00 pm, ESPN+		at UC Davis	W 57−47	9−3	22 – George	9 – West	5 – Fields	University Credit Union Center (489); Davis, CA
December 22, 2025*; 11:00 am, ESPN+		at Sam Houston	L 56–65	9–4	18 – George	8 – West	4 – Fields	Bernard Johnson Coliseum (424); Huntsville, TX
Big Sky regular season
January 1, 2026; 6:00 pm, ESPN+		Montana State	L 79–86	9–5 (0–1)	26 – Baymon	6 – Tied	5 – Fields	Bank of Colorado Arena (685); Greeley, CO
January 3, 2026; 2:00 pm, ESPN+		Montana	W 77–58	10–5 (1–1)	29 – Baymon	9 – Hall	9 – Fields	Bank of Colorado Arena (740); Greeley, CO
January 8, 2026; 7:00 pm, ESPN+		at Idaho State	W 67–56	11–5 (2–1)	19 – George	13 – West	4 – Fields	Reed Gym (860); Pocatello, ID
January 10, 2026; 2:00 pm, ESPN+		at Weber State	W 69–66	12–5 (3–1)	16 – West	10 – West	6 – George	Dee Events Center (673); Ogden, UT
January 15, 2026; 6:00 pm, ESPN+		Portland State	W 80–60	13–5 (4–1)	23 – Baymon	10 – West	5 – Tied	Bank of Colorado Arena (761); Greeley, CO
January 17, 2026; 2:00 pm, ESPN+		Sacramento State	W 68–46	14–5 (5–1)	24 – Baymon	8 – West	2 – Tied	Bank of Colorado Arena (670); Greeley, CO
January 19, 2026; 7:00 pm, ESPN+		at Montana State	L 57–71	14–6 (5–2)	17 – Hall	10 – Hall	4 – Fields	Worthington Arena (1,671); Bozeman, MT
January 24, 2026; 2:00 pm, ESPN+		Northern Arizona	W 72–59	15–6 (6–2)	17 – Baymon	11 – West	5 – George	Bank of Colorado Arena (750); Greeley, CO
January 29, 2026; 12:00 pm, ESPN+		Idaho	L 55–62	15–7 (6–3)	12 – Tied	8 – West	2 – George	Bank of Colorado Arena (2,810); Greeley, CO
January 31, 2026; 2:00 pm, ESPN+		at Eastern Washington	W 71–62	16–7 (7–3)	16 – West	8 – West	6 – George	Reese Court (622); Cheney, WA
February 5, 2026; 6:00 pm, ESPN+		Weber State	W 55–41	17–7 (8–3)	13 – Hall	6 – Tied	4 – George	Bank of Colorado Arena (930); Greeley, CO
February 7, 2026; 2:00 pm, ESPN+		Idaho State	L 69–73	17–8 (8–4)	12 – Tied	6 – West	3 – Tied	Bank of Colorado Arena (1,037); Greeley, CO
February 12, 2026; 7:30 pm, ESPN+		at Sacramento State	W 62–55	18–8 (9–4)	20 – Baymon	12 – West	4 – Fields	Hornet Pavilion (701); Sacramento, CA
February 14, 2026; 2:00 pm, ESPN+		at Portland State	W 71–57	19–8 (10–4)	17 – George	5 – Tied	6 – Fields	Viking Pavilion (414); Portland, OR
February 21, 2026; 2:00 pm, ESPN+		at Northern Arizona	W 81–53	20–8 (11–4)	15 – Baymon	10 – West	4 – Fields	Findlay Toyota Court (356); Flagstaff, AZ
February 26, 2026; 6:00 pm, ESPN+		Eastern Washington	W 70–65	21–8 (12–4)	20 – West	9 – West	5 – George	Bank of Colorado Arena (920); Greeley, CO
February 28, 2026; 4:30 pm, ESPN+		at Idaho	L 41–55	21–9 (12–5)	10 – West	10 – West	3 – George	ICCU Arena (1,743); Moscow, ID
March 2, 2026; 7:00 pm, ESPN+		at Montana	W 61–59	22–9 (13–5)	15 – Riley	15 – West	5 – George	Dahlberg Arena (1,964); Missoula, MT
Big Sky tournament
March 9, 2026; 2:30 pm, ESPN+	(3)	vs. (6) Eastern Washington; Quarterfinals	L 53–55	22–10	14 – Baymon	18 – West	4 – George	Idaho Central Arena; Boise, ID
WNIT
March 19, 2026*; 6:30 pm		at Air Force; First round	W 79–72	23–10	22 – West	13 – West	4 – George	Clune Arena (719); Air Force Academy, CO
March 22, 2026*; 12:00 pm, Midco Sports/SLN		at South Dakota; Second round	L 60–80	23–11	15 – Baymon	5 – Tied	5 – George	Sanford Coyote Sports Center (1,225); Vermillion, SD
*Non-conference game. ^{#}Rankings from AP Poll. (#) Tournament seedings in parentheses. All times are in Mountain.
