= 2025–26 Northern Arizona Lumberjacks women's basketball team =

American college basketball season

2025–26 Northern Arizona Lumberjacks women's basketball
- Conference: Big Sky Conference
- Record: 10–22 (6–12 Big Sky)
- Head coach: Laura Dinkins (1st season)
- Associate head coach: Bryan Camacho
- Assistant coaches: Nicholas Milan; Dajae Black
- Home arena: Rolle Activity Center; Findlay Toyota Court

2025–26 Big Sky women's basketball standings
	Conf.				Overall
Team	W		L	PCT	W		L	PCT
Idaho †	17	–	1	.944	29	–	6	.829
Montana State	16	–	2	.889	27	–	8	.771
Northern Colorado	13	–	5	.722	23	–	11	.676
Idaho State	12	–	6	.667	19	–	11	.633
Sacramento State	8	–	10	.444	15	–	18	.455
Eastern Washington	7	–	11	.389	15	–	18	.455
Northern Arizona	6	–	12	.333	10	–	22	.313
Montana	5	–	13	.278	9	–	22	.290
Weber State	4	–	14	.222	11	–	22	.333
Portland State	2	–	16	.111	6	–	25	.194
† 2026 Big Sky tournament winner

The 2025–26 Northern Arizona Lumberjacks women's basketball team represented Northern Arizona University during the 2025–26 NCAA Division I women's basketball season. The Lumberjacks, led by first-year head coach Laura Dinkins, played their non-conference home games at the Rolle Activity Center, and their conference home games at Findlay Toyota Court, both in Flagstaff, Arizona, as members of the Big Sky Conference. The Lumberjacks finished the season 10–22, 6–12 in Big Sky play, to finish in seventh place. They were defeated by eight seed Montana in the quarterfinals of the Big Sky tournament.

== Previous season ==
The Lumberjacks finished the 2024–25 season 27–8, 16–2 in Big Sky play, to finish in second place. They defeated eight seed Sacramento State in the quarterfinals of the Big Sky tournament before being upset by six seed Montana in the semifinals. They received an at-large bid to the WBIT, where they defeated Arizona in the first round before falling to eventual tournament runner-up Belmont in the second round.

On March 24, 2025, it was announced that head coach Loree Payne would be leaving the program, after eight seasons, in order to take the head coaching position at Santa Clara. A little over a week later, on April 1, the school announced that they would be hiring Grand Canyon associate head coach and former NAU player Laura Dinkins as the team's new head coach.

== Preseason ==
On October 22, 2025, the Big Sky Conference released their preseason coaches and media poll. Northern Arizona was picked to finish tied for ninth in the coaches poll, and eighth in the media poll.

=== Preseason rankings ===
Big Sky Preseason Coaches' Poll
Place	Team	Votes
1	Montana State	74 (5)
2	Montana	72 (3)
3	Idaho	65 (1)
4	Idaho State	57 (1)
5	Sacramento State	50
6	Eastern Washington	38
7	Northern Colorado	36
8	Weber State	28
T-9	Northern Arizona	15
T-9	Portland State	15
(#) first-place votes

Big Sky Preseason Media Poll
Place	Team	Votes
1	Montana State	238 (11)
2	Montana	224 (7)
3	Idaho	220 (7)
4	Sacramento State	177 (2)
5	Idaho State	161
6	Eastern Washington	123
7	Weber State	120
8	Northern Arizona	102
9	Northern Colorado	86
10	Portland State	34
(#) first-place votes

=== Preseason All-Big Sky Team ===
No players were named to the All-Big Sky Team.

== Roster ==
2025–26 Northern Arizona Lumberjacks women's basketball team
Players
Coaches

Pos.	#	Name	Height	Year	Previous school	Hometown
F	0	Emma Dasovich	6 ft 1 in (1.85 m)	So	New Mexico State	Surprise, AZ
G	1	Alyssa Harris	5 ft 7 in (1.7 m)	So	Husson	Kaibito, AZ
G	3	Madison Watts	5 ft 10 in (1.78 m)	So	Loyola Marymount	San Pedro, CA
G	5	Eri Blithikioti	5 ft 11 in (1.8 m)	Jr	UC San Diego	Athens, Greece
F	7	Layla Davis	6 ft 0 in (1.83 m)	So	Cal State Fullerton	Lancaster, CA
F	10	Hannah Williams	5 ft 11 in (1.8 m)	Fr	Salpointe Catholic High School	Tucson, AZ
G	11	Audrey Taylor	5 ft 9 in (1.75 m)	Sr	Timberline High School	Boise, ID
G	12	Addison Dunn	5 ft 10 in (1.78 m)	Fr	Midland Classical Academy	Midland, TX
G	13	J'Bionna Robinson	5 ft 7 in (1.7 m)	Fr	Morrow High School	Atlanta, GA
G/F	14	Valentina Saric	6 ft 2 in (1.88 m)	RS Jr	Jacksonville State	Los Altos, CA
F	23	Kayla Williams	6 ft 0 in (1.83 m)	Sr	Texas A&M–Texarkana	San Diego, CA
G	25	Naomi White	5 ft 9 in (1.75 m)	RS Fr	Grand Canyon	Omaha, Nebraska
G/F	30	Faith Curry	6 ft 0 in (1.83 m)	RS Fr	Liberty High School	Bakersfield, CA
G	35	Simone Morris	5 ft 10 in (1.78 m)	GS	Robert Morris	Carson, CA

Head coach

- Laura Dinkins (Northern Arizona)

Assistant coach(es)

- Bryan Camacho (UCLA)
- Nicholas Milan (Cal State Fullerton)
- Dajae Black (Lewis)

Legend

- (C) Team captain
- (S) Suspended
- (I) Ineligible
- (W) Walk-on
- Injured
- Current redshirt

Roster
Last update: January 31, 2026

== Schedule and results ==
Date time, TV	Rank^{#}	Opponent^{#}	Result	Record	High points	High rebounds	High assists	Site (attendance) city, state
Exhibition
October 27, 2025*; 6:00 p.m.		Arizona Christian	W 96–68		–	–	–	Rolle Activity Center; Flagstaff, AZ
Non-conference regular season
November 3, 2025*; 7:00 p.m., MWN		at New Mexico	L 59–77	0–1	24 – White	8 – Morris	2 – 3 tied	The Pit (3,850); Albuquerque, NM
November 8, 2025*; 2:00 p.m., ESPN+		at Utah Tech	L 73–78	0–2	26 – White	7 – 2 tied	5 – Taylor	Burns Arena (436); St. George, UT
November 11, 2025*; 6:00 p.m., ESPN+		Embry–Riddle (AZ)	W 100–59	1–2	21 – White	9 – H. Williams	6 – White	Rolle Activity Center (372); Flagstaff, AZ
November 15, 2025*; 4:30 p.m., ESPN+		at UC Irvine	L 75–90	1–3	21 – White	7 – Watts	5 – Taylor	Bren Events Center (560); Irvine, CA
November 19, 2025*; 6:00 p.m., ESPN+		Pepperdine	L 74−80	1−4	27 – White	7 – Davis	3 – Robinson	Rolle Activity Center (244); Flagstaff, AZ
November 21, 2025*; 6:00 p.m., ESPN+		at Arizona	L 76−87	1−5	28 – White	7 – Watts	5 – Taylor	McKale Center (5,613); Tucson, AZ
November 26, 2025*; 3:30 p.m., YouTube		vs. Northern Iowa; UNLV Thanksgiving Turkey Tip-Off	L 60–79	1–6	19 – White	8 – K. Williams	5 – 2 tied	Thomas & Mack Center; Paradise, NV
November 28, 2025*; 1:00 p.m., YouTube		vs. Creighton; UNLV Thanksgiving Turkey Tip-Off	L 62–86	1–7	19 – Robinson	5 – 2 tied	3 – 2 tied	Thomas & Mack Center; Paradise, NV
December 3, 2025*; 10:00 a.m., Midco Sports Plus		at St. Thomas; Big Sky–Summit Challenge	L 66–74	1–8	21 – Davis	8 – Morris	6 – Robinson	Lee & Penny Anderson Arena (558); St. Paul, MN
December 6, 2025*; 2:00 p.m., ESPN+		South Dakota State; Big Sky–Summit Challenge	L 72–88	1–9	25 – White	7 – Davis	3 – Taylor	Rolle Activity Center (238); Flagstaff, AZ
December 15, 2025*; 6:00 p.m., ESPN+		Park–Gilbert	W 95–53	2–9	30 – White	13 – Watts	7 – Taylor	Rolle Activity Center (278); Flagstaff, AZ
December 18, 2025*; 7:00 p.m., ESPN+		at Cal State Northridge	W 77−56	3−9	27 – White	10 – White	5 – 2 tied	Premier America Credit Union Arena (276); Northridge, CA
December 20, 2025*; 3:00 p.m., ESPN+		at UC San Diego	W 71–68	4–9	18 – White	8 – Morris	3 – 2 tied	LionTree Arena (246); La Jolla, CA
Big Sky regular season
January 1, 2026; 6:00 p.m., ESPN+		Montana	W 81–72	5–9 (1–0)	27 – White	10 – White	6 – Dasovich	Findlay Toyota Court (263); Flagstaff, AZ
January 3, 2026; 2:00 p.m., ESPN+		Montana State	L 65–82	5–10 (1–1)	18 – White	7 – 3 tied	4 – 2 tied	Findlay Toyota Court (246); Flagstaff, AZ
January 8, 2026; 6:00 p.m., ESPN+		at Weber State	W 71–58	6–10 (2–1)	37 – White	8 – Morris	4 – Watts	Dee Events Center (307); Ogden, UT
January 10, 2026; 2:00 p.m., ESPN+		at Idaho State	L 46–59	6–11 (2–2)	11 – White	10 – Watts	2 – Taylor	Reed Gym (964); Pocatello, ID
January 15, 2026; 6:00 p.m., ESPN+		Sacramento State	L 59–78	6–12 (2–3)	17 – White	5 – 3 tied	3 – 2 tied	Findlay Toyota Court (342); Flagstaff, AZ
January 17, 2026; 2:00 p.m., ESPN+		Portland State	W 80–68	7–12 (3–3)	17 – Watts	9 – Watts	7 – Taylor	Findlay Toyota Court (384); Flagstaff, AZ
January 19, 2026; 2:00 p.m., ESPN+		at Montana	L 72–76	7–13 (3–4)	29 – White	9 – Watts	5 – Taylor	Dahlberg Arena (2,449); Missoula, MT
January 24, 2026; 2:00 p.m., ESPN+		at Northern Colorado	L 59–72	7–14 (3–5)	26 – White	6 – Dasovich	3 – 2 tied	Bank of Colorado Arena (750); Greeley, CO
January 29, 2026; 3:00 p.m., ESPN+		Eastern Washington	L 87–93	7–15 (3–6)	32 – K. Williams	5 – 2 tied	8 – Dasovich	Findlay Toyota Court (179); Flagstaff, AZ
January 31, 2026; 2:00 p.m., ESPN+		at Idaho	L 71–94	7–16 (3–7)	20 – Watts	9 – White	2 – 4 tied	ICCU Arena (1,077); Moscow, ID
February 5, 2026; 6:00 p.m., ESPN+		Idaho State	L 70–79	7–17 (3–8)	21 – White	11 – Watts	5 – Taylor	Findlay Toyota Court (343); Flagstaff, AZ
February 7, 2026; 2:00 p.m., ESPN+		Weber State	W 73–65	8–17 (4–8)	31 – White	11 – Watts	2 – 5 tied	Findlay Toyota Court (371); Flagstaff, AZ
February 12, 2026; 8:00 p.m., ESPN+		at Portland State	W 88–80	9–17 (5–8)	25 – White	10 – Watts	6 – Watts	Viking Pavilion (267); Portland, OR
February 14, 2026; 3:00 p.m., ESPN+		at Sacramento State	W 60–55	10–17 (6–8)	17 – Williams	8 – Watts	4 – Watts	Hornet Pavilion (402); Sacramento, CA
February 21, 2026; 2:00 p.m., ESPN+		Northern Colorado	L 53–81	10–18 (6–9)	15 – Davis	7 – Davis	1 – 4 tied	Findlay Toyota Court (356); Flagstaff, AZ
February 26, 2026; 6:00 p.m., ESPN+		Idaho	L 57–85	10–19 (6–10)	12 – White	8 – White	4 – Robinson	Findlay Toyota Court (312); Flagstaff, AZ
February 28, 2026; 4:30 p.m., ESPN+		at Eastern Washington	L 61–81	10–20 (6–11)	24 – Williams	10 – Williams	4 – Robinson	Reese Court (852); Cheney, WA
March 2, 2026; 7:00 p.m., ESPN+		at Montana State	L 48–68	10–21 (6–12)	21 – White	8 – Davis	2 – Williams	Worthington Arena (2,283); Bozeman, MT
Big Sky tournament
March 7, 2026; 2:30 p.m., ESPN+	(7)	vs. (8) Montana; First round	L 60–61	10–22	24 – White	9 – Dasovich	4 – Robinson	Idaho Central Arena (750); Boise, ID
*Non-conference game. ^{#}Rankings from AP poll. (#) Tournament seedings in parentheses. All times are in Mountain.
