= 2025–26 Idaho Vandals women's basketball team =

American college basketball season

2025–26 Idaho Vandals women's basketball

Big Sky regular season and tournament champions

NCAA tournament, First Round
- Conference: Big Sky Conference
- Record: 29–6 (17–1 Big Sky)
- Head coach: Arthur Moreira (2nd season)
- Associate head coach: Drew Muscatell
- Assistant coaches: Lindsey Foster; Derek Saich; Hannah Roberts
- Home arena: ICCU Arena

2025–26 Big Sky women's basketball standings
	Conf.				Overall
Team	W		L	PCT	W		L	PCT
Idaho †	17	–	1	.944	29	–	6	.829
Montana State	16	–	2	.889	27	–	8	.771
Northern Colorado	13	–	5	.722	23	–	11	.676
Idaho State	12	–	6	.667	19	–	11	.633
Sacramento State	8	–	10	.444	15	–	18	.455
Eastern Washington	7	–	11	.389	15	–	18	.455
Northern Arizona	6	–	12	.333	10	–	22	.313
Montana	5	–	13	.278	9	–	22	.290
Weber State	4	–	14	.222	11	–	22	.333
Portland State	2	–	16	.111	6	–	25	.194
† 2026 Big Sky tournament winner

The 2025–26 Idaho Vandals women's basketball team represented the University of Idaho during the 2025–26 NCAA Division I women's basketball season. The Vandals, led by second-year head coach Arthur Moreira, played their home games at the Idaho Central Credit Union Arena in Moscow, Idaho, as members of the Big Sky Conference.

== Previous season ==
The Vandals finished the 2024–25 season 18–12, 10–8 in Big Sky play, to finish in a tie for third place. They were defeated by Montana in the quarterfinals of the Big Sky tournament.

== Preseason ==
On October 22, 2025, the Big Sky Conference released their preseason coaches and media poll. Idaho was picked to finish third in both the coaches poll, with one first-place vote, and the media poll, with seven first-place votes.

=== Preseason rankings ===
Big Sky Preseason Coaches' Poll
Place	Team	Votes
1	Montana State	74 (5)
2	Montana	72 (3)
3	Idaho	65 (1)
4	Idaho State	57 (1)
5	Sacramento State	50
6	Eastern Washington	38
7	Northern Colorado	36
8	Weber State	28
T-9	Northern Arizona	15
T-9	Portland State	15
(#) first-place votes

Big Sky Preseason Media Poll
Place	Team	Votes
1	Montana State	238 (11)
2	Montana	224 (7)
3	Idaho	220 (7)
4	Sacramento State	177 (2)
5	Idaho State	161
6	Eastern Washington	123
7	Weber State	120
8	Northern Arizona	102
9	Northern Colorado	86
10	Portland State	34
(#) first-place votes

=== Preseason All-Big Sky Team ===
Preseason All-Big Sky Team
Player	Year	Position
Hope Hassmann	Junior	Guard

== Roster ==
2025–26 Idaho Vandals women's basketball team
Players
Coaches

Pos.	#	Name	Height	Year	Previous school	Hometown
F	1	Reese de Groot	5 ft 11 in (1.8 m)	Fr	Clarkston High School	Lewiston, Idaho
F	2	Sarah Brans	6 ft 1 in (1.85 m)	Sr	Monte Vista High School	Dublin, California
G	3	Kyra Gardner	5 ft 11 in (1.8 m)	Sr	Washington State	Raymond, Washington
G	4	Hope Hassmann	5 ft 8 in (1.73 m)	Jr	Cal State Fullerton	Maple Valley, Washington
G	5	Ella Uriarte	5 ft 8 in (1.73 m)	So	Folsom High School	Folsom, California
G	6	Sofia Ekh	5 ft 7 in (1.7 m)	Fr	RIG Luleå	Västerås, Sweden
F	9	Debora dos Santos	6 ft 0 in (1.83 m)	RS Sr	San Francisco	Rio de Janeiro, Brazil
F	10	Lorena Barbosa	6 ft 5 in (1.96 m)	RS Sr	San Francisco	Itatiba, Brazil
G	12	Anja Bukvic	5 ft 10 in (1.78 m)	Sr	Louisiana Tech	Belgrade, Serbia
F	13	Catelyn Deaver	6 ft 0 in (1.83 m)	Sr	Utah Tech	Sumner, Washington
G	14	Katlin Kangur	5 ft 7 in (1.7 m)	Fr	TSA/CITYTEED Tallinn	Tallinn, Estonia
G	21	Niveya Henley	6 ft 0 in (1.83 m)	RS Sr	Furman	Seattle, Washington
G	23	Ana Beatriz Passos Alves da Silva	5 ft 11 in (1.8 m)	So	Brazil U19 national team	São Paulo, Brazil
G	24	Mary McMorris	5 ft 6 in (1.68 m)	Sr	Valdosta State	Las Vegas, Nevada
G	37	Ana Pinheiro	6 ft 0 in (1.83 m)	So	Portugal U18 national team	Braga, Portugal

Head coach

- Arthur Moreira (Sonoma State)

Assistant coach(es)

- Drew Muscatell (Oregon)
- Lindsey Foster (La Verne)
- Derek Saich (UC Santa Barbara)
- Hannah Roberts (Idaho)

Legend

- (C) Team captain
- (S) Suspended
- (I) Ineligible
- (W) Walk-on
- Injured
- Current redshirt

Roster
Last update: January 29, 2026

== Schedule and results ==
Date time, TV	Rank^{#}	Opponent^{#}	Result	Record	High points	High rebounds	High assists	Site (attendance) city, state
Non-conference regular season
November 3, 2025*; 11:00 am, ESPN+		at Washington State; Battle of the Palouse	W 87–85	1–0	26 – Gardner	8 – Gardner	4 – Hassmann	Beasley Coliseum (1,382); Pullman, WA
November 7, 2025*; 11:00 am, ESPN+		at UC Davis	L 76–89	1–1	17 – Pinheiro	11 – Pinheiro	6 – Pinheiro	University Credit Union Center (5,567); Davis, CA
November 9, 2025*; 2:00 pm, ESPN+		Walla Walla	W 94–39	2–1	16 – Ekh	8 – Deaver	6 – McMorris	ICCU Arena (280); Moscow, ID
November 15, 2025*; 2:00 pm, ESPN+		Southern Utah	W 76–72	3–1	21 – Hassmann	9 – Gardner	5 – Hassmann	ICCU Arena (396); Moscow, ID
November 21, 2025*; 7:30 pm, ESPN+		UC Riverside	W 89–75	4–1	18 – Passos Alves da Silva	6 – Tied	4 – Hassmann	ICCU Arena (355); Moscow, ID
November 23, 2025*; 1:00 pm, ESPN+		Cal State Northridge	W 89–56	5−1	18 – Barbosa	8 – Tied	4 – Pinheiro	ICCU Arena (1,006); Moscow, ID
November 28, 2025*; 4:30 pm		vs. Colgate; UC Irvine Tournament	W 82–53	6−1	17 – Hassmann	9 – dos Santos	4 – Hassmann	Bren Events Center (325); Irvine, CA
November 29, 2025*; 2:00 pm		vs. Wichita State; UC Irvine Tournament	W 83–61	7–1	21 – Gardner	10 – dos Santos	7 – Hassmann	Bren Events Center (441); Irvine, CA
December 3, 2025*; 11:00 am, ESPN+		Oral Roberts; Big Sky-Summit Challenge	L 89–92	7–2	22 – dos Santos	15 – dos Santos	6 – Hassmann	ICCU Arena (2,486); Moscow, ID
December 6, 2025*; 11:00 am, SLN		at Denver; Big Sky-Summit Challenge	W 84–54	8–2	16 – Gardner	12 – Gardner	4 – Tied	Hamilton Gymnasium (504); Denver, CO
December 10, 2025*; 7:00 pm, ACCNX		at California	L 61–68	8–3	14 – Pinheiro	7 – Tied	2 – Tied	Haas Pavilion (903); Berkeley, CA
December 13, 2025*; 12:00 pm, MW Network		at Utah State	L 73–80	8–4	18 – Pinheiro	10 – Gardner	8 – Hassmann	Smith Spectrum (427); Logan, UT
December 20, 2025*; 2:00 pm, ESPN+		Western Oregon	W 91–63	9–4	19 – Pinheiro	12 – Gardner	10 – Gardner	ICCU Arena (858); Moscow, ID
Big Sky regular season
January 3, 2026; 2:00 pm, ESPN+/SWX		at Eastern Washington	W 69–63	10–4 (1–0)	15 – Pinheiro	10 – Gardner	5 – Hassmann	Reese Court (712); Cheney, WA
January 8, 2026; 6:00 pm, ESPN+		at Montana	W 67–50	11–4 (2–0)	28 – Gardner	11 – Gardner	5 – McMorris	Dahlberg Arena (1,892); Missoula, MT
January 10, 2026; 1:00 pm, ESPN+		at Montana State	L 66–99	11–5 (2–1)	15 – Pinheiro	6 – Pinheiro	2 – Tied	Worthington Arena (2,145); Bozeman, MT
January 15, 2026; 6:00 pm, ESPN+		Idaho State; King Spud Rivalry	W 81–68	12–5 (3–1)	14 – Pinheiro	10 – dos Santos	5 – Hassmann	ICCU Arena (507); Moscow, ID
January 17, 2026; 2:00 pm, ESPN+		Weber State	W 95–76	13–5 (4–1)	27 – Gardner	12 – dos Santos	4 – Tied	ICCU Arena (555); Moscow, ID
January 22, 2026; 6:30 pm, ESPN+		at Sacramento State	W 62–55	14–5 (5–1)	11 – Hassmann	9 – Passos Alves da Silva	3 – Hassmann	Hornet Pavilion (397); Sacramento, CA
January 24, 2026; 2:00 pm, ESPN+		at Portland State	W 84–66	15–5 (6–1)	20 – Hassmann	9 – Barbosa	12 – Hassmann	Viking Pavilion (538); Portland, OR
January 29, 2026; 11:00 am, ESPN+		at Northern Colorado	W 62–55	16–5 (7–1)	15 – Tied	7 – dos Santos	4 – Pinheiro	Bank of Colorado Arena (2,810); Greeley, CO
January 31, 2026; 2:00 pm, ESPN+		Northern Arizona	W 94–71	17–5 (8–1)	20 – Hassmann	7 – Gardner	6 – Hassmann	ICCU Arena (1,077); Moscow, ID
February 5, 2026; 6:00 pm, ESPN+		Montana State	W 73–70 ^{OT}	18–5 (9–1)	18 – Gardner	17 – dos Santos	6 – Hassmann	ICCU Arena (1,773); Moscow, ID
February 7, 2026; 2:00 pm, ESPN+		Montana	W 89–65	19–5 (10–1)	19 – Hassmann	9 – Pinheiro	7 – Hassmann	ICCU Arena (1,588); Moscow, ID
February 12, 2026; 5:00 pm, ESPN+		at Weber State	W 80–67	20–5 (11–1)	25 – Hassmann	8 – Tied	5 – Hassmann	Dee Events Center (433); Ogden, UT
February 14, 2026; 1:00 pm, ESPN+		at Idaho State; King Spud Rivalry	W 65–50	21–5 (12–1)	15 – Barbosa	8 – Tied	4 – Hassmann	Reed Gym (1,245); Pocatello, ID
February 19, 2026; 6:00 pm, ESPN+		Portland State	W 86–66	22–5 (13–1)	17 – Gardner	10 – Pinheiro	5 – Tied	ICCU Arena (1,352); Moscow, ID
February 21, 2026; 2:00 pm, ESPN+		Sacramento State	W 75–60	23–5 (14–1)	22 – Hassmann	11 – dos Santos	5 – Gardner	ICCU Arena (1,444); Moscow, ID
February 26, 2026; 6:00 pm, ESPN+		at Northern Arizona	W 85–57	24–5 (15–1)	14 – Beatriz Passos Alves da Silva	11 – Gardner	4 – Gardner	Findlay Toyota Court (312); Flagstaff, AZ
February 28, 2026; 3:30 pm, ESPN+		Northern Colorado	W 55–41	25–5 (16–1)	12 – Hassmann	11 – dos Santos	6 – Hassmann	ICCU Arena (2,339); Moscow, ID
March 2, 2026; 6:00 pm, ESPN+		Eastern Washington	W 75–64	26–5 (17–1)	25 – Hassmann	15 – dos Santos	5 – Uriarte	ICCU Arena (1,395); Moscow, ID
Big Sky tournament
March 8, 2026; 11:00 am, ESPN+	(1)	vs. (9) Weber State; Second Round	W 66–52	27–5	14 – Tied	11 – Pinheiro	6 – Hassmann	Idaho Central Arena; Boise, ID
March 10, 2026; 11:00 am, ESPN+	(1)	vs. (5) Sacramento State; Semifinals	W 59–51	28–5	15 – Hassmann	12 – dos Santos	3 – Hassmann	Idaho Central Arena; Boise, ID
March 11, 2026; 2:00 pm, ESPNU	(1)	vs. (2) Montana State; Championship	W 60–57	29–5	12 – Beatriz Passos Alves da Silva	10 – dos Santos	4 – Hassmann	Idaho Central Arena; Boise, ID
NCAA tournament
March 20, 2026*; 7:00 pm, ESPN	(11 S4)	at (4 S4) No. 16 Oklahoma; First Round	L 59–89	29–6	19 – Gardner	8 – Tied	3 – Uriarte	Lloyd Noble Center (6,345); Norman, OK
*Non-conference game. ^{#}Rankings from AP Poll. (#) Tournament seedings in parentheses. S4=Sacramento 4. All times are in Pacific.
