= Kristen Mattio =

American basketball coach

Current position
- Title: Head coach
- Team: Northern Colorado
- Conference: Big Sky
- Record: 80–78 (.506)

Biographical details
- Education: Evangel; Austin Peay (M.A.)

Playing career
- 1999–2003: Evangel
- Position: Point guard

Coaching career (HC unless noted)
- 2003–2005: Montana State (assistant)
- 2005–2006: Austin Peay (assistant)
- –: Evangel (assistant)
- –: Memphis Central HS (assistant)
- 2007–2012: Fort Lewis (assistant)
- 2012–2013: Northwest Missouri State (assistant)
- 2013–2015: West Texas A&M (associate HC)
- 2015–2021: West Texas A&M
- 2021–present: Northern Colorado

Head coaching record
- Overall: 234–113 (.674)

Kristen Mattio is an American basketball coach and former player who is the current head coach of the Northern Colorado Bears women's basketball team.

== Coaching career ==
From 2015 until 2021, Mattio served as head coach of the West Texas A&M Buffaloes women's basketball team.

On May 8, 2021, Mattio was named head coach at Northern Colorado.

== Head coaching record ==
Record table
Season	Team	Overall	Conference	Standing	Postseason
West Texas A&M Lady Buffs (Lone Star) (2015–2021)
2015–16	West Texas A&M	28–5	13–3	1st	NCAA Regional Finals
2016–17	West Texas A&M	26–9	15–5	3rd	NCAA Elite Eight
2017–18	West Texas A&M	29–5	16–4	T-1st	NCAA Regional Finals
2018–19	West Texas A&M	29–4	17–3	T-1st	NCAA Regional Semifinals
2019–20	West Texas A&M	27–6	19–3	T-2nd	Cancelled due to the COVID-19 pandemic.
2020–21	West Texas A&M	15–6	13–5	3rd	
West Texas A&M:		154–35 (.815)	93–23 (.802)		
Northern Colorado Bears (Big Sky) (2021–present)
2021–22	Northern Colorado	15–16	9–11	8th	
2022–23	Northern Colorado	13–18	5–13	9th	
2023–24	Northern Colorado	15–16	10–8	T-4th	
2024–25	Northern Colorado	14–17	6–12	9th	
2025–26	Northern Colorado	23–11	13–5	3rd	WNIT Second Round
Northern Colorado:		80–78 (.506)	43–48 (.473)		
Total:		234–113 (.674)			
National champion Postseason invitational champion Conference regular season champion Conference regular season and conference tournament champion Division regular season champion Division regular season and conference tournament champion Conference tournament champion
