= 2025–26 Sacramento State Hornets women's basketball team =

American college basketball season

2025–26 Sacramento State Hornets women's basketball
- Conference: Big Sky Conference
- Record: 15–18 (8–10 Big Sky)
- Head coach: Aaron Kallhoff (3rd season)
- Associate head coach: De'Audra Brown; Michael Floyd
- Assistant coaches: Jodi Page; Austin Ritter
- Home arena: Hornet Pavilion

2025–26 Big Sky women's basketball standings
	Conf.				Overall
Team	W		L	PCT	W		L	PCT
Idaho †	17	–	1	.944	29	–	6	.829
Montana State	16	–	2	.889	27	–	8	.771
Northern Colorado	13	–	5	.722	23	–	11	.676
Idaho State	12	–	6	.667	19	–	11	.633
Sacramento State	8	–	10	.444	15	–	18	.455
Eastern Washington	7	–	11	.389	15	–	18	.455
Northern Arizona	6	–	12	.333	10	–	22	.313
Montana	5	–	13	.278	9	–	22	.290
Weber State	4	–	14	.222	11	–	22	.333
Portland State	2	–	16	.111	6	–	25	.194
† 2026 Big Sky tournament winner

The 2025–26 Sacramento State Hornets women's basketball team represents California State University, Sacramento during the 2025–26 NCAA Division I women's basketball season. The Hornets, led by third-year head coach Aaron Kallhoff, play their home games at the newly opened Hornet Pavilion in Sacramento, California as members of the Big Sky Conference.

This will be Sacramento State's final season as members of the Big Sky Conference, as they will be joining the Big West Conference, effective July 1, 2026.

== Previous season ==
The Hornets finished the 2024–25 season 15–18, 7–11 in Big Sky play, to finish in a tie for seventh place. They defeated Eastern Washington, before falling to Northern Arizona in the quarterfinals of the Big Sky tournament.

== Preseason ==
On October 22, 2025, the Big Sky Conference released their preseason coaches and media poll. Sacramento State was picked to finish fifth in the coaches poll, and fourth in the media poll, with two first-place votes.

=== Preseason rankings ===
Big Sky Preseason Coaches' Poll
Place	Team	Votes
1	Montana State	74 (5)
2	Montana	72 (3)
3	Idaho	65 (1)
4	Idaho State	57 (1)
5	Sacramento State	50
6	Eastern Washington	38
7	Northern Colorado	36
8	Weber State	28
T-9	Northern Arizona	15
T-9	Portland State	15
(#) first-place votes

Big Sky Preseason Media Poll
Place	Team	Votes
1	Montana State	238 (11)
2	Montana	224 (7)
3	Idaho	220 (7)
4	Sacramento State	177 (2)
5	Idaho State	161
6	Eastern Washington	123
7	Weber State	120
8	Northern Arizona	102
9	Northern Colorado	86
10	Portland State	34
(#) first-place votes

=== Preseason All-Big Sky Team ===
Preseason All-Big Sky Team
Player	Year	Position
Benthe Versteeg*	(redshirt) Senior	Guard
(*) Preseason MVP

== Roster ==
2025–26 Sacramento State Hornets women's basketball team
Players
Coaches

Pos.	#	Name	Height	Year	Previous school	Hometown
G	0	Jeniece Harmon	5 ft 5 in (1.65 m)	RS Sr	Hawai'i–Hilo	Fresno, California
G	1	Benthe Versteeg	5 ft 9 in (1.75 m)	RS Sr	Landslake Lions	Amsterdam-Zuid, Netherlands
G	2	Natalie Picton	5 ft 5 in (1.65 m)	Jr	Montana State	Welland, Ontario
G/F	3	Brooklyn Taylor	6 ft 0 in (1.83 m)	So	Long Beach Poly High School	Inglewood, California
G/F	4	Jamiah Fontenberry	5 ft 11 in (1.8 m)	Fr	Inderkum High School	Sacramento, California
F	5	Elizabeth Abiara	6 ft 2 in (1.88 m)	Jr	Central Arkansas	Mansfield, Texas
F	8	Keanna Salave'a	6 ft 2 in (1.88 m)	Jr	Providence (MT)	Vancouver, Washington
F	10	Pinja Paananen	6 ft 2 in (1.88 m)	So	Arkansas	Laukaa, Finland
G	11	Rubi Gray	5 ft 10 in (1.78 m)	So	BA Centre of Excellence	Devonport, Australia
C	12	Ajong Lual	6 ft 5 in (1.96 m)	So	Garden City Community College	Tucson, Arizona
G	14	Tali Fa'i	5 ft 7 in (1.7 m)	Jr	Laney College	Newark, California
G	22	Jaety Mandaquit (W)	5 ft 7 in (1.7 m)	RS Fr	Real Salt Lake Academy	Hilo, Hawaii
F	23	Elisa Leghissa	6 ft 2 in (1.88 m)	Fr	USE Rosa Scotti Empoli	Trieste, Italy
G	24	Sophia Lee	5 ft 7 in (1.7 m)	RS Jr	BYU	Stockton, California
F	31	Noemi Arvai	6 ft 1 in (1.85 m)	So	KSC Szekszárd	Budapest, Hungary
F	45	Fatoumata Jaiteh	6 ft 2 in (1.88 m)	Sr	Northern Arizona	Lynnwood, Washington

Head coach

- Aaron Kallhoff (Bemidji State)

Assistant coach(es)

- De'Audra Brown (Elizabeth City State)
- Michael Floyd (Murray State)
- Jodi Page (Central Queensland)
- Austin Ritter (Sacramento State)

Legend

- (C) Team captain
- (S) Suspended
- (I) Ineligible
- (W) Walk-on
- Injured
- Current redshirt

Roster
Last update: January 30, 2026

== Schedule and results ==
Date time, TV	Rank^{#}	Opponent^{#}	Result	Record	High points	High rebounds	High assists	Site (attendance) city, state
Non-conference regular season
November 3, 2025*; 6:30 pm, ESPN+		Stanton	W 124–39	1–0	19 – Taylor	8 – Salave'a	8 – Jaiteh	Hornet Pavilion (603); Sacramento, CA
November 6, 2025*; 11:00 am, ESPN+		Nevada	W 65–45	2–0	14 – Versteeg	5 – Tied	5 – Versteeg	Hornet Pavilion (1,144); Sacramento, CA
November 9, 2025*; 7:00 pm, ACCNX		at California	L 52–69	2–1	12 – Tied	6 – Jaiteh	5 – Versteeg	Haas Pavilion (1,323); Berkeley, CA
November 12, 2025*; 6:00 pm, ESPN+		at UC San Diego	W 71–60	3–1	24 – Gray	9 – Jaiteh	6 – Versteeg	LionTree Arena (341); La Jolla, CA
November 15, 2025*; 2:00 pm, ESPN+		at Long Beach State	W 57−54	4−1	13 – Gray	9 – Taylor	6 – Versteeg	Walter Pyramid (612); Long Beach, CA
November 21, 2025*; 6:30 pm, ESPN+		Cal State Fullerton	W 78−58	5−1	26 – Gray	6 – Tied	7 – Versteeg	Hornet Pavilion (767); Sacramento, CA
November 24, 2025*; 6:30 pm, ESPN+		UC Davis	L 67–70 ^{OT}	5–2	24 – Picton	12 – Versteeg	6 – Versteeg	Hornet Pavilion (597); Sacramento, CA
November 28, 2025*; 2:30 pm, ESPN+		vs. Chattanooga; CBU Classic	L 57–59	5–3	19 – Gray	8 – Salave'a	4 – Versteeg	Fowler Events Center (196); Riverside, CA
November 29, 2025*; 12:00 pm, ESPN+		at California Baptist; CBU Classic	L 49–92	5–4	11 – Gray	8 – Gray	3 – Versteeg	Fowler Events Center (354); Riverside, CA
December 4, 2025*; 6:00 pm, ESPN+		at Pacific	L 54–67	5–5	24 – Gray	10 – Abiara	5 – Versteeg	Alex G. Spanos Center (613); Stockton, CA
December 15, 2025*; 6:30 pm, ESPN+		Simpson	W 102–42	6–5	27 – Picton	5 – Tied	6 – Picton	Hornet Pavilion; Sacramento, CA
December 17, 2025*; 4:00 pm, ESPN+		at San Francisco	L 55−61	6−6	14 – Gray	9 – Versteeg	5 – Versteeg	Chase Center (219); San Francisco, CA
December 21, 2025*; 2:00 pm, NBCSBA/MWN		at San Jose State	L 56–61	6–7	16 – Gray	11 – Salave'a	5 – Versteeg	Provident Credit Union Event Center (415); San Jose, CA
Big Sky regular season
January 1, 2026; 6:30 pm, ESPN+		Idaho State	L 46–61	6–8 (0–1)	16 – Gray	6 – Tied	5 – Versteeg	Hornet Pavilion (412); Sacramento, CA
January 3, 2026; 12:00 pm, ESPN+		Weber State	W 60–39	7–8 (1–1)	18 – Versteeg	13 – Salave'a	5 – Versteeg	Hornet Pavilion (502); Sacramento, CA
January 10, 2026; 1:00 pm, ESPN+		Portland State	W 68–64	8–8 (2–1)	21 – Picton	12 – Abiara	6 – Versteeg	Hornet Pavilion (479); Sacramento, CA
January 15, 2026; 5:00 pm, ESPN+		at Northern Arizona	W 78–59	9–8 (3–1)	26 – Gray	11 – Gray	6 – Mandaquit	Findlay Toyota Court (342); Flagstaff, AZ
January 17, 2026; 1:00 pm, ESPN+		at Northern Colorado	L 46–68	9–9 (3–2)	15 – Gray	7 – Tied	3 – Mandaquit	Bank of Colorado Arena (670); Greeley, CO
January 22, 2026; 6:30 pm, ESPN+		Idaho	L 55–62	9–10 (3–3)	26 – Versteeg	8 – Abiara	4 – Versteeg	Hornet Pavilion (397); Sacramento, CA
January 24, 2026; 2:00 pm, ESPN+		Eastern Washington	W 61–54	10–10 (4–3)	19 – Gray	7 – Jaiteh	3 – Versteeg	Hornet Pavilion (607); Sacramento, CA
January 29, 2026; 6:00 pm, ESPN+		at Montana State	L 31–66	10–11 (4–4)	8 – Gray	8 – Jaiteh	1 – Gray	Worthington Arena (2,148); Bozeman, MT
January 31, 2026; 1:00 pm, ESPN+		at Montana	W 64–57	11–11 (5–4)	18 – Gray	9 – Jaiteh	7 – Versteeg	Dahlberg Arena (2,751); Missoula, MT
February 2, 2026; 5:00 pm, ESPN+		at Weber State	L 64–72	11–12 (5–5)	22 – Picton	5 – Tied	5 – Versteeg	Dee Events Center (351); Ogden, UT
February 7, 2026; 1:00 pm, ESPN+		at Portland State	L 62–64	11–13 (5–6)	17 – Picton	8 – Jaiteh	3 – Jaiteh	Viking Pavilion (602); Portland, OR
February 12, 2026; 6:30 pm, ESPN+		Northern Colorado	L 55–62	11–14 (5–7)	14 – Versteeg	5 – Salave'a	3 – Tied	Hornet Pavilion (701); Sacramento, CA
February 14, 2026; 2:00 pm, ESPN+		Northern Arizona	L 55–60	11–15 (5–8)	13 – Salave'a	11 – Jaiteh	4 – Tied	Hornet Pavilion (402); Sacramento, CA
February 19, 2026; 11:00 am, ESPN+		at Eastern Washington	W 69–60	12–15 (6–8)	16 – Versteeg	8 – Salave'a	8 – Versteeg	Reese Court (2,689); Cheney, WA
February 21, 2026; 2:00 pm, ESPN+		at Idaho	L 60–75	12–16 (6–9)	19 – Versteeg	7 – Tied	2 – Tied	ICCU Arena (1,444); Moscow, ID
February 26, 2026; 6:30 pm, ESPN+		Montana	W 75–57	13–16 (7–9)	24 – Picton	10 – Versteeg	6 – Versteeg	Hornet Pavilion (1,525); Sacramento, CA
February 28, 2026; 2:00 pm, ESPN+		Montana State	L 54–61	13–17 (7–10)	19 – Gray	10 – Jaiteh	9 – Versteeg	Hornet Pavilion (703); Sacramento, CA
March 2, 2026; 6:00 pm, ESPN+		at Idaho State	W 85–72	14–17 (8–10)	24 – Gray	6 – Salave'a	7 – Versteeg	Reed Gym (1,192); Pocatello, ID
Big Sky tournament
March 9, 2026; 12:00 p.m., ESPN+	(5)	vs. (4) Idaho State; Quarterfinals	W 62–53	15–17	19 – Picton	8 – Salave'a	6 – Versteeg	Idaho Central Arena; Boise, ID
March 10, 2026; 12:00 p.m., ESPN+	(5)	vs. (1) Idaho; Semifinals	L 51–59	15–18	15 – Picton	10 – Jaiteh	3 – Tied	Idaho Central Arena; Boise, ID
*Non-conference game. ^{#}Rankings from AP Poll. (#) Tournament seedings in parentheses. All times are in Pacific.
