= 2026 Big Sky Conference women's basketball tournament =

American college basketball tournament

- Classification: Division I
- Season: 2025–26
- Teams: 10
- Site: Idaho Central Arena; Boise, Idaho
- Champions: Idaho (3rd title)
- Winning coach: Arthur Moreira (1st title)
- Television: ESPN+, ESPNU,

2025–26 Big Sky women's basketball standings
	Conf.				Overall
Team	W		L	PCT	W		L	PCT
Idaho †	17	–	1	.944	29	–	6	.829
Montana State	16	–	2	.889	27	–	8	.771
Northern Colorado	13	–	5	.722	23	–	11	.676
Idaho State	12	–	6	.667	19	–	11	.633
Sacramento State	8	–	10	.444	15	–	18	.455
Eastern Washington	7	–	11	.389	15	–	18	.455
Northern Arizona	6	–	12	.333	10	–	22	.313
Montana	5	–	13	.278	9	–	22	.290
Weber State	4	–	14	.222	11	–	22	.333
Portland State	2	–	16	.111	6	–	25	.194
† 2026 Big Sky tournament winner

The 2026 Big Sky Conference women's basketball tournament was the postseason tournament for the Big Sky Conference, held March 7–11, 2026, at Idaho Central Arena in Boise, Idaho. The Idaho Vandals defeated the Montana State Bobcats and became the Big Sky's automatic bid to the 2026 NCAA tournament.

== Seeds ==
The ten teams were seeded by conference record, with a tiebreaker system for identical conference records. The top six teams received a first-round bye.

Seed	School	Record	Tiebreaker
1	Idaho	17–1	
2	Montana State	16–2	
3	Northern Colorado	13–5	
4	Idaho State	12–6	
5	Sacramento State	8–10	
6	Eastern Washington	7–11	
7	Northern Arizona	6–12	
8	Montana	5–13	
9	Weber State	4–14	
10	Portland State	2–16	

== Schedule ==
Session	Game	Time	Matchup	Score	Television
First round – Saturday, March 7
1	1	Noon	No. 9 Weber State vs. No. 10 Portland State	76–53	ESPN+
1	2	2:30 p.m.	No. 7 Northern Arizona vs. No. 8 Montana	60–61	ESPN+
Quarterfinals – Sunday, March 8
2	3	Noon	No. 1 Idaho vs. No. 9 Weber State	66–52	ESPN+
2	4	2:30 p.m.	No. 2 Montana State vs. No. 8 Montana	78–57	ESPN+
Quarterfinals – Monday, March 9
3	5	Noon	No. 4 Idaho State vs. No. 5 Sacramento State	53–62	ESPN+
3	6	2:30 p.m.	No. 3 Northern Colorado vs. No. 6 Eastern Washington	53–55	ESPN+
Semifinals – Tuesday, March 10
4	7	Noon	No. 1 Idaho vs. No. 5 Sacramento State	59–51	ESPN+
4	8	2:30 p.m.	No. 2 Montana State vs. No. 6 Eastern Washington	79–77^{OT}	ESPN+
Championship game – Wednesday, March 11
5	9	3:00 p.m.	No. 1 Idaho vs. No. 2 Montana State	60–57	ESPNU
Game times in MT. Rankings denote tournament seeding.

== Bracket ==
First round March 7 ESPN+
9	Weber State	76
10	Portland State	53
7	Northern Arizona	60
8	Montana	61

Quarterfinals; March 8–9; ESPN+
1	Idaho	66
9	Weber State	52
4	Idaho State	53
5	Sacramento State	62
2	Montana State	78
8	Montana	57
3	Northern Colorado	53
6	Eastern Washington	55

Semifinals; March 10; ESPN+
1	Idaho	59
5	Sacramento State	51
2	Montana State	79*
6	Eastern Washington	77

Championship; March 11; ESPN2
1	Idaho	60
2	Montana State	57

Souce:

* denotes overtime period
