= 2025–26 Portland State Vikings women's basketball team =

American college basketball season

2025–26 Portland State Vikings women's basketball
- Conference: Big Sky Conference
- Record: 6–25 (2–16 Big Sky)
- Head coach: Karlie Burris (1st season)
- Associate head coach: Kerri Nakamoto
- Assistant coaches: Hailey King; Raina Perez
- Home arena: Viking Pavilion

2025–26 Big Sky women's basketball standings
	Conf.				Overall
Team	W		L	PCT	W		L	PCT
Idaho †	17	–	1	.944	29	–	6	.829
Montana State	16	–	2	.889	27	–	8	.771
Northern Colorado	13	–	5	.722	23	–	11	.676
Idaho State	12	–	6	.667	19	–	11	.633
Sacramento State	8	–	10	.444	15	–	18	.455
Eastern Washington	7	–	11	.389	15	–	18	.455
Northern Arizona	6	–	12	.333	10	–	22	.313
Montana	5	–	13	.278	9	–	22	.290
Weber State	4	–	14	.222	11	–	22	.333
Portland State	2	–	16	.111	6	–	25	.194
† 2026 Big Sky tournament winner

The 2025–26 Portland State Vikings women's basketball team represents Portland State University during the 2025–26 NCAA Division I women's basketball season. The Vikings, led by first-year head coach Karlie Burris, play their home games at the Viking Pavilion in Portland, Oregon as members of the Big Sky Conference.

== Previous season ==
The Vikings finished the 2024–25 season 4–24, 1–17 in Big Sky play, to finish in tenth (last) place. They were defeated by Northern Colorado in the first round of the Big Sky tournament.

On March 12, 2025, it was announced that the school would be moving on from head coach Chelsey Gregg, ending her four-year tenure with the team. On April 4, the school announced that they would be hiring UNLV assistant coach Karlie Burris as the team's new head coach.

== Preseason ==
On October 22, 2025, the Big Sky Conference released their preseason coaches and media poll. Portland State was picked to finish tied for ninth in the coaches poll, and tenth (last) in the media poll.

=== Preseason rankings ===
Big Sky Preseason Coaches' Poll
Place	Team	Votes
1	Montana State	74 (5)
2	Montana	72 (3)
3	Idaho	65 (1)
4	Idaho State	57 (1)
5	Sacramento State	50
6	Eastern Washington	38
7	Northern Colorado	36
8	Weber State	28
T-9	Northern Arizona	15
T-9	Portland State	15
(#) first-place votes

Big Sky Preseason Media Poll
Place	Team	Votes
1	Montana State	238 (11)
2	Montana	224 (7)
3	Idaho	220 (7)
4	Sacramento State	177 (2)
5	Idaho State	161
6	Eastern Washington	123
7	Weber State	120
8	Northern Arizona	102
9	Northern Colorado	86
10	Portland State	34
(#) first-place votes

=== Preseason All-Big Sky Team ===
No players were named to the All-Big Sky Team.

== Roster ==
2025–26 Portland State Vikings women's basketball team
Players
Coaches

Pos.	#	Name	Height	Year	Previous school	Hometown
G	1	Kailee Field	5 ft 10 in (1.78 m)	Fr	Ipswich Force	Brisbane, Australia
G	2	Jamia Carter	5 ft 7 in (1.7 m)	Sr	Seward County Community College	Las Vegas, Nevada
G	4	Sophie Buzzard	5 ft 10 in (1.78 m)	Fr	Camas High School	Camas, Washington
F	5	Ajae Yoakum	6 ft 0 in (1.83 m)	RS Sr	Arizona	Portland, Oregon
G	8	Cici Ellington	6 ft 0 in (1.83 m)	RS Sr	Grambling State	Portland, Oregon
F	9	Hannah Chicken	6 ft 0 in (1.83 m)	Fr	Newcastle Falcons	Taree, Australia
F	10	Kirstine Munk	6 ft 0 in (1.83 m)	Jr	Central Arizona College	Copenhagen, Denmark
G	11	Laynee Torres-Kahapea	5 ft 6 in (1.68 m)	Jr	Punahou School	Kāneʻohe, Hawaii
G	12	Kyleigh Brown	5 ft 8 in (1.73 m)	So	Silverton High School	Silverton, Oregon
G	13	Alani Encinas	5 ft 7 in (1.7 m)	Sr	Buena High School	Sierra Vista, Arizona
F	20	Katelyn Best	6 ft 3 in (1.91 m)	So	Northwest Christian School	Phoenix, Arizona
G	22	Ryme Jaekel	5 ft 9 in (1.75 m)	Fr	Wilsonville High School	Gladstone, Oregon
G	23	Taylor Moffat	5 ft 8 in (1.73 m)	Sr	Williston State College	Mount Barker, Australia

Head coach

- Karlie Burris (Portland)

Assistant coach(es)

- Kerri Nakamoto (Cal Poly)
- Hailey King (Cal State Fullerton)
- Raina Perez (NC State)

Legend

- (C) Team captain
- (S) Suspended
- (I) Ineligible
- (W) Walk-on
- Injured
- Current redshirt

Roster
Last update: January 31, 2026

== Schedule and results ==
Date time, TV	Rank^{#}	Opponent^{#}	Result	Record	High points	High rebounds	High assists	Site (attendance) city, state
Exhibition
October 30, 2025*; 7:00 pm		Warner Pacific	W 88–51	–	26 – Yoakum	9 – Torres-Kahapea	8 – Torres-Kahapea	Viking Pavilion (437); Portland, OR
Non-conference regular season
November 4, 2025*; 9:00 pm, ESPN+		at Hawai'i	L 63–74	0–1	22 – Torres-Kahapea	6 – Torres-Kahapea	3 – Moffat	Stan Sheriff Center (2,001); Honolulu, HI
November 11, 2025*; 7:00 pm, ESPN+		Willamette	W 89–52	1–1	24 – Brown	8 – Chicken	4 – Tied	Viking Pavilion (430); Portland, OR
November 16, 2025*; 12:00 pm, ESPN+		at Colorado	L 45–77	1–2	16 – Brown	6 – Torres-Kahapea	3 – Yoakum	CU Events Center (2,540); Boulder, CO
November 18, 2025*; 5:30 pm, MWN		at Air Force	L 55–65	1–3	11 – Tied	8 – Chicken	2 – Tied	Clune Arena (1,041); Air Force Academy, CO
November 22, 2025*; 6:00 pm, ESPN+		at Utah Tech	L 63−71	1−4	26 – Brown	9 – Torres-Kahapea	3 – Torres-Kahapea	Burns Arena (572); St. George, UT
November 28, 2025*; 5:00 pm, ESPN+		San Jose State	W 75−64	2−4	22 – Brown	8 – Chicken	7 – Torres-Kahapea	Viking Pavilion (289); Portland, OR
November 30, 2025*; 2:00 pm, ESPN+		UC San Diego	L 64–94	2–5	20 – Ellington	9 – Brown	4 – Chicken	Viking Pavilion (310); Portland, OR
December 3, 2025*; 7:00 pm, ESPN+		South Dakota; Big Sky-Summit Challenge	L 51–75	2–6	28 – Brown	5 – Tied	2 – Brown	Viking Pavilion (305); Portland, OR
December 6, 2025*; 12:00 pm, SLN		at Kansas City; Big Sky-Summit Challenge	W 85–79 ^{OT}	3–6	29 – Brown	14 – Yoakum	2 – Tied	Swinney Recreation Center (225); Kansas City, MO
December 13, 2025*; 2:00 pm, ESPN+		at Cal State Fullerton	L 66–81	3–7	15 – Chicken	10 – Chicken	2 – Tied	Titan Gym (210); Fullerton, CA
December 17, 2025*; 7:00 pm, ESPN+		Seattle	W 85–62	4–7	18 – Ellington	14 – Ellington	5 – Tied	Viking Pavilion (324); Portland, OR
December 21, 2025*; 2:00 pm, ESPN+		Portland	L 53−98	4−8	14 – Chicken	4 – Yoakum	5 – Torres-Kahapea	Viking Pavilion (651); Portland, OR
Big Sky regular season
January 1, 2026; 7:00 pm, ESPN+		Weber State	W 68–58	5–8 (1–0)	18 – Brown	16 – Ellington	4 – Yoakum	Viking Pavilion (314); Portland, OR
January 3, 2026; 2:00 pm, ESPN+		Idaho State	L 63–72	5–9 (1–1)	23 – Brown	11 – Ellington	7 – Moffat	Viking Pavilion (332); Portland, OR
January 10, 2026; 1:00 pm, ESPN+		at Sacramento State	L 64–68	5–10 (1–2)	18 – Brown	12 – Yoakum	4 – Brown	Hornet Pavilion (479); Sacramento, CA
January 15, 2026; 5:00 pm, ESPN+		at Northern Colorado	L 60–80	5–11 (1–3)	10 – Tied	10 – Yoakum	3 – Yoakum	Bank of Colorado Arena (761); Greeley, CO
January 17, 2026; 1:00 pm, ESPN+		at Northern Arizona	L 68–80	5–12 (1–4)	16 – Tied	7 – Brown	3 – Tied	Findlay Toyota Court (384); Flagstaff, AZ
January 22, 2026; 7:00 pm, ESPN+		Eastern Washington	L 63–81	5–13 (1–5)	25 – Brown	6 – Chicken	2 – Tied	Viking Pavilion (472); Portland, OR
January 24, 2026; 2:00 pm, ESPN+		Idaho	L 66–84	5–14 (1–6)	23 – Brown	6 – Ellington	5 – Chicken	Viking Pavilion (538); Portland, OR
January 29, 2026; 6:00 pm, ESPN+		at Montana	L 63–69	5–15 (1–7)	20 – Brown	12 – Chicken	4 – Chicken	Dahlberg Arena (2,159); Missoula, MT
January 31, 2026; 1:00 pm, ESPN+		at Montana State	L 43–91	5–16 (1–8)	11 – Tied	7 – Ellington	1 – Tied	Worthington Arena (2,472); Bozeman, MT
February 2, 2026; 6:00 pm, ESPN+		at Idaho State	L 57–69	5–17 (1–9)	14 – Torres-Kahapea	8 – Chicken	4 – Yoakum	Reed Gym (891); Pocatello, ID
February 7, 2026; 1:00 pm, ESPN+		Sacramento State	W 64–62	6–17 (2–9)	22 – Chicken	8 – Yoakum	7 – Torres-Kahapea	Viking Pavilion (602); Portland, OR
February 12, 2026; 7:00 pm, ESPN+		Northern Arizona	L 80–88 ^{OT}	6–18 (2–10)	20 – Ellington	11 – Chicken	5 – Moffat	Viking Pavilion (267); Portland, OR
February 14, 2026; 2:00 pm, ESPN+		Northern Colorado	L 57–71	6–19 (2–11)	14 – Brown	5 – Brown	4 – Torres-Kahapea	Viking Pavilion (414); Portland, OR
February 19, 2026; 6:00 pm, ESPN+		at Idaho	L 66–86	6–20 (2–12)	16 – Chicken	4 – Tied	3 – Yoakum	ICCU Arena (1,352); Moscow, ID
February 21, 2026; 2:00 pm, ESPN+		at Eastern Washington	L 78–87	6–21 (2–13)	23 – Ellington	9 – Chicken	4 – Brown	Reese Court (570); Cheney, WA
February 26, 2026; 7:00 pm, ESPN+		Montana State	L 63–66	6–22 (2–14)	14 – Ellington	9 – Ellington	4 – Tied	Viking Pavilion (500); Portland, OR
February 28, 2026; 2:00 pm, ESPN+		Montana	L 53–55	6–23 (2–15)	17 – Ellington	10 – Ellington	5 – Torres-Kahapea	Viking Pavilion (603); Portland, OR
March 2, 2026; 5:00 pm, ESPN+		at Weber State	L 52–81	6–24 (2–16)	22 – Brown	7 – Yoakum	3 – Tied	Dee Events Center (518); Ogden, UT
Big Sky tournament
March 7, 2026; 12:00 p.m., ESPN+	(10)	vs. (9) Weber State; First round	L 53–76	6–25	17 – Chicken	7 – Ellington	4 – Torres-Kahapea	Idaho Central Arena; Boise, ID
*Non-conference game. ^{#}Rankings from AP Poll. (#) Tournament seedings in parentheses. All times are in Pacific.
