= 2025–26 Weber State Wildcats women's basketball team =

American college basketball season

2025–26 Weber State Wildcats women's basketball
- Conference: Big Sky Conference
- Record: 11–22 (4–14 Big Sky)
- Head coach: Jenteal Jackson (3rd season)
- Associate head coach: Nicole Yazzie
- Assistant coaches: Cydney McHenry; Alli Winters; Jordan Vasquez
- Home arena: Dee Events Center

2025–26 Big Sky women's basketball standings
	Conf.				Overall
Team	W		L	PCT	W		L	PCT
Idaho †	17	–	1	.944	29	–	6	.829
Montana State	16	–	2	.889	27	–	8	.771
Northern Colorado	13	–	5	.722	23	–	11	.676
Idaho State	12	–	6	.667	19	–	11	.633
Sacramento State	8	–	10	.444	15	–	18	.455
Eastern Washington	7	–	11	.389	15	–	18	.455
Northern Arizona	6	–	12	.333	10	–	22	.313
Montana	5	–	13	.278	9	–	22	.290
Weber State	4	–	14	.222	11	–	22	.333
Portland State	2	–	16	.111	6	–	25	.194
† 2026 Big Sky tournament winner

The 2025–26 Weber State Wildcats women's basketball team represents Weber State University during the 2025–26 NCAA Division I women's basketball season. The Wildcats, led by third-year head coach Jenteal Jackson, play their home games at the Dee Events Center in Ogden, Utah as members of the Big Sky Conference.

== Previous season ==
The Wildcats finished the 2024–25 season 13–16, 10–8 in Big Sky play, to finish in a tie for third place. They were defeated by Idaho State in the quarterfinals of the Big Sky tournament.

== Preseason ==
On October 22, 2025, the Big Sky Conference released their preseason coaches and media poll. Weber State was picked to finish eighth in the coaches poll, and seventh in the media poll.

=== Preseason rankings ===
Big Sky Preseason Coaches' Poll
Place	Team	Votes
1	Montana State	74 (5)
2	Montana	72 (3)
3	Idaho	65 (1)
4	Idaho State	57 (1)
5	Sacramento State	50
6	Eastern Washington	38
7	Northern Colorado	36
8	Weber State	28
T-9	Northern Arizona	15
T-9	Portland State	15
(#) first-place votes

Big Sky Preseason Media Poll
Place	Team	Votes
1	Montana State	238 (11)
2	Montana	224 (7)
3	Idaho	220 (7)
4	Sacramento State	177 (2)
5	Idaho State	161
6	Eastern Washington	123
7	Weber State	120
8	Northern Arizona	102
9	Northern Colorado	86
10	Portland State	34
(#) first-place votes

=== Preseason All-Big Sky Team ===
No players were named to the All-Big Sky Team.

== Roster ==
2025–26 Weber State Wildcats women's basketball team
Players
Coaches

Pos.	#	Name	Height	Year	Previous school	Hometown
G/F	0	Maya Davis	5 ft 11 in (1.8 m)	So	Garfield High School	Seattle, Washington
G	1	Vanna Quintana	5 ft 9 in (1.75 m)	So	Buchanan High School	Dinuba, California
G	2	Alyssa Coombs	5 ft 10 in (1.78 m)	Jr	USU Eastern	Roy, Utah
G/F	5	Dakota Nap	6 ft 1 in (1.85 m)	So	Hazen High School	Renton, Washington
F	7	Antoniette Emma-Nnopu	5 ft 11 in (1.8 m)	Sr	UNC Greensboro	Geelong, Australia
G	8	Hannah Robbins	6 ft 0 in (1.83 m)	Jr	Montana State	Phoenix, Arizona
F	10	Paris Lauro	6 ft 0 in (1.83 m)	Jr	New Mexico	Dallas, Texas
G/F	11	Arizana Peaua	6 ft 1 in (1.85 m)	Jr	Westminster	Reno, Nevada
G	12	Fui Niumeitolu	5 ft 9 in (1.75 m)	So	Alta High School	Sandy, Utah
G	13	Makenna Shaffer-Lauer	6 ft 1 in (1.85 m)	Jr	Buffalo	Greeley, Colorado
G	15	Japrix Stubbs	6 ft 0 in (1.83 m)	Jr	USU Eastern	Cedar City, Utah
G	22	Sydney White	5 ft 9 in (1.75 m)	Jr	California Baptist	Centennial, Colorado
G/F	23	Celestine Segretain	6 ft 1 in (1.85 m)	Jr	Eastern Arizona College	Angers, France
F	25	Nicole Willardson	6 ft 4 in (1.93 m)	Jr	Utah Tech	Richfield, Utah
G	32	Lanae Billy	5 ft 7 in (1.7 m)	Sr	Fort Lewis	Shiprock, New Mexico

Head coach

- Jenteal Jackson (Westminster)

Assistant coach(es)

- Nicole Yazzie (Westminster)
- Cydney McHenry (Adams State)
- Alli Winters (Utah)
- Jordan Vasquez (Cal State San Marcos)

Legend

- (C) Team captain
- (S) Suspended
- (I) Ineligible
- (W) Walk-on
- Injured
- Current redshirt

Roster
Last update: February 1, 2026

== Schedule and results ==
Date time, TV	Rank^{#}	Opponent^{#}	Result	Record	High points	High rebounds	High assists	Site (attendance) city, state
Non-conference regular season
November 4, 2025*; 6:00 pm, MWN		at Colorado State	L 58–75	0–1	22 – Emma-Nnopu	11 – Emma-Nnopu	7 – White	Moby Arena (1,670); Fort Collins, CO
November 8, 2025*; 2:00 pm, ESPN+		Westminster	W 84–47	1–1	18 – Willardson	9 – Tied	9 – White	Dee Events Center (336); Ogden, UT
November 12, 2025*; 6:00 pm, ESPN+		UC Davis	L 52–75	1–2	19 – Billy	16 – Emma-Nnopu	3 – Billy	Dee Events Center (273); Ogden, UT
November 15, 2025*; 2:00 pm, ESPN+		Utah Tech	W 82–76	2–2	23 – Billy	12 – Emma-Nnopu	8 – Emma-Nnopu	Dee Events Center (512); Ogden, UT
November 20, 2025*; 6:00 pm, ESPN+		at Utah Valley	L 55–59	2–3	21 – Emma-Nnopu	8 – Emma-Nnopu	7 – Robbins	UCCU Center (520); Orem, UT
November 22, 2025*; 2:00 pm, ESPN+		at BYU	L 62−79	2−4	19 – Robbins	8 – Emma-Nnopu	8 – Emma-Nnopu	Marriott Center (2,291); Provo, UT
November 26, 2025*; 7:00 pm, ESPN+		at Utah	L 52−65	2−5	19 – Billy	10 – Emma-Nnopu	4 – Tied	Jon M. Huntsman Center (2,030); Salt Lake City, UT
December 3, 2025*; 6:00 pm, SLN		at South Dakota State; Big Sky - Summit League Challenge	L 56–87	2–6	13 – Billy	8 – Emma-Nnopu	3 – Tied	First Bank and Trust Arena (1,801); Brookings, SD
December 6, 2025*; 12:00 pm, ESPN+		North Dakota State; Big Sky - Summit League Challenge	L 72–79	2–7	27 – Emma-Nnopu	11 – Emma-Nnopu	7 – Robbins	Dee Events Center (472); Ogden, UT
December 9, 2025*; 11:00 am, ESPN+		Montana Western	W 74–33	3–7	21 – Lauro	9 – Tied	5 – White	Dee Events Center (1,367); Ogden, UT
December 17, 2025*; 6:00 pm, ESPN+		La Sierra	W 84–47	4–7	21 – Robbins	9 – Emma-Nnopu	8 – Niumeitolu	Dee Events Center (426); Ogden, UT
December 20, 2025*; 4:30 pm, ESPN+		at Loyola Marymount; LMU Tournament	W 68–60	5–7	15 – Robbins	9 – Emma-Nnopu	3 – Tied	Gersten Pavilion (196); Los Angeles, CA
December 21, 2025*; 1:00 pm		vs. Omaha; LMU Tournament	W 74−61	6−7	14 – Niumeitolu	10 – Emma-Nnopu	8 – Emma-Nnopu	Gersten Pavilion; Los Angeles, CA
Big Sky regular season
January 1, 2026; 8:00 pm, ESPN+		at Portland State	L 58–68	6–8 (0–1)	18 – Robbins	9 – Billy	3 – Tied	Viking Pavilion (314); Portland, OR
January 3, 2026; 1:00 pm, ESPN+		at Sacramento State	L 39–60	6–9 (0–2)	15 – White	7 – Shaffer-Lauer	2 – Tied	Hornet Pavilion (502); Sacramento, CA
January 8, 2026; 6:00 pm, ESPN+		Northern Arizona	L 58–71	6–10 (0–3)	16 – Emma-Nnopu	15 – Emma-Nnopu	4 – Billy	Dee Events Center (307); Ogden, UT
January 10, 2026; 2:00 pm, ESPN+		Northern Colorado	L 66–69	6–11 (0–4)	22 – Emma-Nnopu	13 – Emma-Nnopu	3 – Tied	Dee Events Center (673); Ogden, UT
January 15, 2026; 7:00 pm, ESPN+		at Eastern Washington	L 58–73	6–12 (0–5)	15 – Billy	9 – Emma-Nnopu	6 – Emma-Nnopu	Reese Court (579); Cheney, WA
January 17, 2026; 3:00 pm, ESPN+		at Idaho	L 76–95	6–13 (0–6)	11 – Tied	7 – Emma-Nnopu	5 – White	ICCU Arena (555); Moscow, ID
January 22, 2026; 6:00 pm, ESPN+		Montana	L 50–51	6–14 (0–7)	12 – Emma-Nnopu	14 – Emma-Nnopu	5 – Billy	Dee Events Center (373); Ogden, UT
January 24, 2026; 2:00 pm, ESPN+		Montana State	L 72–92	6–15 (0–8)	22 – Billy	8 – Emma-Nnopu	7 – White	Dee Events Center (589); Ogden, UT
January 31, 2026; 2:00 pm, ESPN+		at Idaho State	L 54–65	6–16 (0–9)	16 – Emma-Nnopu	9 – Emma-Nnopu	6 – White	Reed Gym (1,358); Pocatello, ID
February 2, 2026; 6:00 pm, ESPN+		Sacramento State	W 72–64	7–16 (1–9)	19 – Emma-Nnpou	8 – Emma-Nnpou	6 – Billy	Dee Events Center (351); Ogden, UT
February 5, 2026; 6:00 pm, ESPN+		at Northern Colorado	L 41–55	7–17 (1–10)	10 – Tied	6 – Peaua	4 – White	Bank of Colorado Arena (930); Greeley, CO
February 7, 2026; 2:00 pm, ESPN+		at Northern Arizona	L 65–73	7–18 (1–11)	16 – Robbins	13 – Emma-Nnpou	4 – White	Findlay Toyota Court (371); Flagstaff, AZ
February 12, 2026; 6:00 pm, ESPN+		Idaho	L 67–80	7–19 (1–12)	13 – Emma-Nnpou	8 – Emma-Nnpou	6 – White	Dee Events Center (33); Ogden, UT
February 14, 2026; 2:00 pm, ESPN+		Eastern Washington	W 74–72 ^{OT}	8–19 (2–12)	19 – White	11 – Emma-Nnpou	5 – Robbins	Dee Events Center (581); Ogden, UT
February 19, 2026; 6:00 pm, ESPN+		at Montana State	L 36–81	8–20 (2–13)	10 – Robbins	8 – Emma-Nnopu	2 – Billy	Worthington Arena (1,851); Bozeman, MT
February 21, 2026; 2:00 pm, ESPN+		at Montana	W 86–79 ^{OT}	9–20 (3–13)	28 – Emma-Nnopu	8 – Willardson	10 – Robbins	Dahlberg Arena (2,373); Missoula, MT
February 28, 2026; 2:00 pm, ESPN+		Idaho State	L 54–59	9–21 (3–14)	15 – Billy	13 – Emma-Nnpou	5 – White	Dee Events Center (561); Ogden, UT
March 2, 2026; 6:00 pm, ESPN+		Portland State	W 81–52	10–21 (4–14)	19 – Billy	12 – Emma-Nnpou	6 – Robbins	Dee Events Center (518); Ogden, UT
Big Sky tournament
March 7, 2026; 12:00 p.m., ESPN+	(9)	vs. (10) Portland State; First round	W 76–53	11–21	23 – Emma-Nnpou	9 – Robbins	6 – White	Idaho Central Arena; Boise, ID
March 8, 2026; 12:00 p.m., ESPN+	(9)	vs. (1) Idaho; Quarterfinals	L 52–66	11–22	14 – Tied	11 – Willardson	4 – Emma-Nnpou	Idaho Central Arena; Boise, ID
*Non-conference game. ^{#}Rankings from AP Poll. (#) Tournament seedings in parentheses. All times are in Mountain.
