= 2025–26 Idaho State Bengals women's basketball team =

American college basketball season

2025–26 Idaho State Bengals women's basketball
- Conference: Big Sky Conference
- Record: 19–11 (12–6 Big Sky)
- Head coach: Seton Sobolewski (18th season)
- Associate head coach: Chelsey Gregg; Keithan Gregg
- Assistant coach: Ashleigh van Vliet
- Home arena: Reed Gym

2025–26 Big Sky women's basketball standings
	Conf.				Overall
Team	W		L	PCT	W		L	PCT
Idaho †	17	–	1	.944	29	–	6	.829
Montana State	16	–	2	.889	27	–	8	.771
Northern Colorado	13	–	5	.722	23	–	11	.676
Idaho State	12	–	6	.667	19	–	11	.633
Sacramento State	8	–	10	.444	15	–	18	.455
Eastern Washington	7	–	11	.389	15	–	18	.455
Northern Arizona	6	–	12	.333	10	–	22	.313
Montana	5	–	13	.278	9	–	22	.290
Weber State	4	–	14	.222	11	–	22	.333
Portland State	2	–	16	.111	6	–	25	.194
† 2026 Big Sky tournament winner

The 2025–26 Idaho State Bengals women's basketball team represents Idaho State University during the 2025–26 NCAA Division I women's basketball season. The Bengals, led by 18th-year head coach Seton Sobolewski, play their home games at Reed Gym in Pocatello, Idaho as members of the Big Sky Conference.

== Previous season ==
The Bengals finished the 2024–25 season 14–17, 8–10 in Big Sky play, to finish in a tie for fifth place. They defeated Weber State, before falling to top-seeded and eventual tournament champions Montana State in the semifinals of the Big Sky tournament.

== Preseason ==
On October 22, 2025, the Big Sky Conference released their preseason coaches and media poll. Idaho State was picked to finish fourth in the coaches poll, with one first-place vote, and fifth in the media poll.

=== Preseason rankings ===
Big Sky Preseason Coaches' Poll
Place	Team	Votes
1	Montana State	74 (5)
2	Montana	72 (3)
3	Idaho	65 (1)
4	Idaho State	57 (1)
5	Sacramento State	50
6	Eastern Washington	38
7	Northern Colorado	36
8	Weber State	28
T-9	Northern Arizona	15
T-9	Portland State	15
(#) first-place votes

Big Sky Preseason Media Poll
Place	Team	Votes
1	Montana State	238 (11)
2	Montana	224 (7)
3	Idaho	220 (7)
4	Sacramento State	177 (2)
5	Idaho State	161
6	Eastern Washington	123
7	Weber State	120
8	Northern Arizona	102
9	Northern Colorado	86
10	Portland State	34
(#) first-place votes

=== Preseason All-Big Sky Team ===
No players were named to the All-Big Sky Team.

== Roster ==
2025–26 Idaho State Bengals women's basketball team
Players
Coaches

Pos.	#	Name	Height	Year	Previous school	Hometown
G	1	Kacey Spink	5 ft 9 in (1.75 m)	Sr	Ferris High School	Spokane, Washington
G	2	Aspen Caldwell	5 ft 7 in (1.7 m)	Jr	Utah Valley	Idaho Falls, Idaho
G	3	Cam Collman	5 ft 8 in (1.73 m)	RS Sr	Portland	La Grande, Oregon
G	4	Alyse Aby	5 ft 11 in (1.8 m)	Jr	Laurel High School	Laurel, Montana
G	5	Tasia Jordan	5 ft 8 in (1.73 m)	GS	Kirkwood Community College	Melrose Park, Illinois
G	7	Molly Hays	5 ft 8 in (1.73 m)	So	Cody High School	Cody, Wyoming
G	8	Tariah Carter	5 ft 11 in (1.8 m)	Fr	Melba High School	Melba, Idaho
G/F	11	Milena Sucacuexe	6 ft 2 in (1.88 m)	Fr	Gdessa Barreiro	Barreiro, Portugal
F	12	Mackenzie Marenchin	6 ft 2 in (1.88 m)	So	Lincoln Prep School	Windsor, Ontario
F	13	Asa Wolfram	6 ft 2 in (1.88 m)	Fr	Aþena Basketball	Hveragerði, Iceland
F	14	Piper Carlson	6 ft 1 in (1.85 m)	Jr	Albertville High School	Albertville, Minnesota
G	18	Maeva Gauffrenet	5 ft 8 in (1.73 m)	Fr	ESB Villeneuve-d'Ascq	Toucy, France
F	20	Aurora Elder	6 ft 3 in (1.91 m)	So	Sage Hill School	Perris, California
G	22	Sophia Covello	5 ft 9 in (1.75 m)	RS Sr	Woodcreek High School	Roseville, California
G	23	Tylie Jones	6 ft 0 in (1.83 m)	Sr	New Mexico State	Rigby, Idaho
F	24	Halle Wright	6 ft 0 in (1.83 m)	Sr	Prosser High School	Prosser, Washington

Head coach

- Seton Sobolewski (Northern Arizona)

Assistant coach(es)

- Chelsey Gregg (Southern Oregon)
- Keithan Gregg (Great Falls)
- Ashleigh van Vliet (Idaho State)

Legend

- (C) Team captain
- (S) Suspended
- (I) Ineligible
- (W) Walk-on
- Injured
- Current redshirt

Roster
Last update: January 6, 2026

== Schedule and results ==
Date time, TV	Rank^{#}	Opponent^{#}	Result	Record	High points	High rebounds	High assists	Site (attendance) city, state
Non-conference regular season
November 4, 2025*; 5:00 pm, ESPN+		Westminster	W 99–47	1–0	26 – Jordan	11 – Carlson	5 – Tied	Reed Gym (808); Pocatello, ID
November 8, 2025*; 6:00 pm, MWN		at Grand Canyon	W 67–55	2–0	20 – Jordan	9 – Jordan	5 – Tied	Global Credit Union Arena (3,021); Phoenix, AZ
November 12, 2025*; 7:00 pm, ESPN+		UC Irvine	W 61–49	3–0	12 – Jordan	9 – Tied	5 – Spink	Reed Gym (807); Pocatello, ID
November 16, 2025*; 2:00 pm, ESPN+		South Dakota	L 63–64	3–1	16 – Tied	6 – Tied	6 – Spink	Reed Gym (753); Pocatello, ID
November 21, 2025*; 5:30 pm		vs. Portland; Bank of Hawai'i Classic	W 58−57	4−1	13 – Jordan	11 – Spink	3 – Caldwell	Stan Sheriff Center (2,784); Honolulu, HI
November 23, 2025*; 3:00 pm		vs. Loyola Marymount; Bank of Hawai'i Classic	L 52−71	4−2	8 – Spink	6 – Tied	2 – Carlson	Stan Sheriff Center; Honolulu, HI
December 3, 2025*; 7:00 pm, ESPN+		Omaha; Big Sky–Summit Challenge	W 74–43	5–2	19 – Carlson	11 – Tied	8 – Spink	Reed Gym (762); Pocatello, ID
December 6, 2025*; 1:00 pm, Midco Sports		at Oral Roberts; Big Sky–Summit Challenge	L 58–68	5–3	24 – Jordan	9 – Carlson	2 – Aby	Mabee Center (1,521); Tulsa, OK
December 11, 2025*; 7:00 pm, ESPN+		at BYU	L 59–68	5–4	22 – Jordan	13 – Carlson	5 – Caldwell	Marriott Center (2,224); Provo, UT
December 13, 2025*; 3:00 pm, ESPN+		at Cal Poly	W 62–49	6–4	12 – Carlson	8 – Spink	6 – Spink	Mott Athletics Center (453); San Luis Obispo, CA
December 20, 2025*; 12:00 pm, ESPN+		at Utah Valley	W 59–56	7–4	26 – Jordan	10 – Tied	10 – Spink	UCCU Center (1,316); Orem, UT
Big Sky regular season
January 1, 2026; 7:30 pm, ESPN+		at Sacramento State	W 61−46	8−4 (1–0)	14 – Caldwell	8 – Tied	2 – Tied	Hornet Pavilion (412); Sacramento, CA
January 3, 2026; 3:00 pm, ESPN+		at Portland State	W 72–63	9–4 (2–0)	20 – Jordan	12 – Carlson	5 – Tied	Viking Pavilion (332); Portland, OR
January 8, 2026; 7:00 pm, ESPN+		Northern Colorado	L 56–67	9–5 (2–1)	13 – Spink	8 – Carlson	4 – Spink	Reed Gym (860); Pocatello, ID
January 10, 2026; 2:00 pm, ESPN+		Northern Arizona	W 59–46	10–5 (3–1)	18 – Jordan	10 – Jordan	6 – Caldwell	Reed Gym (964); Pocatello, ID
January 15, 2026; 7:00 pm, ESPN+		at Idaho; King Spud Rivalry	L 68–81	10–6 (3–2)	23 – Jordan	7 – Spink	2 – Tied	ICCU Arena (507); Moscow, ID
January 17, 2026; 3:00 pm, ESPN+		at Eastern Washington	W 66–57	11–6 (4–2)	15 – Carlson	8 – Wright	4 – Aby	Reese Court (663); Cheney, WA
January 22, 2026; 7:00 pm, ESPN+		Montana State	W 79–60	12–6 (5–2)	17 – Spink	10 – Tied	5 – Spink	Reed Gym (1,011); Pocatello, ID
January 24, 2026; 2:00 pm, ESPN+		Montana	L 67–70 ^{OT}	12–7 (5–3)	13 – Tied	8 – Tied	7 – Spink	Reed Gym (1,211); Pocatello, ID
January 31, 2026; 2:00 pm, ESPN+		Weber State	W 65–54	13–7 (6–3)	19 – Jordan	8 – Carlson	5 – Gauffrenet	Reed Gym (1,358); Pocatello, ID
February 2, 2026; 7:00 pm, ESPN+		Portland State	W 69–57	14–7 (7–3)	30 – Jordan	8 – Carlson	4 – Spink	Reed Gym (891); Pocatello, ID
February 5, 2026; 6:00 pm, ESPN+		at Northern Arizona	W 79–70	15–7 (8–3)	17 – Spink	11 – Spink	6 – Caldwell	Findlay Toyota Court (343); Flagstaff, AZ
February 7, 2026; 2:00 pm, ESPN+		at Northern Colorado	W 73–69	16–7 (9–3)	20 – Spink	9 – Carlson	5 – Caldwell	Bank of Colorado Arena (1,037); Greeley, CO
February 12, 2026; 7:00 pm, ESPN+		Eastern Washington	W 77–65	17–7 (10–3)	21 – Jordan	12 – Carlson	5 – Spink	Reed Gym (1,024); Pocatello, ID
February 14, 2026; 2:00 pm, ESPN+		Idaho; King Spud Rivalry	L 50–65	17–8 (10–4)	15 – Jordan	7 – Carlson	4 – Caldwell	Reed Gym (1,245); Pocatello, ID
February 19, 2026; 7:00 pm, ESPN+		at Montana	W 71–54	18–8 (11–4)	19 – Carlson	8 – Wright	7 – Spink	Dahlberg Arena (1,825); Missoula, MT
February 21, 2026; 2:00 pm, ESPN+		at Montana State	L 61–67	18–9 (11–5)	14 – Wright	10 – Tied	3 – Carlson	Worthington Arena (2,645); Bozeman, MT
February 28, 2026; 2:00 pm, ESPN+		at Weber State	W 59–54	19–9 (12–5)	13 – Spink	14 – Spink	6 – Spink	Dee Events Center (561); Ogden, UT
March 2, 2026; 7:00 pm, ESPN+		Sacramento State	L 72–85	19–10 (12–6)	20 – Aby	10 – Carlson	4 – Spink	Reed Gym (1,192); Pocatello, ID
Big Sky tournament
March 9, 2026; 12:00 p.m., ESPN+	(4)	vs. (5) Sacramento State; Quarterfinals	L 53–62	19–11	21 – Jordan	8 – Carlson	6 – Spink	Idaho Central Arena; Boise, ID
*Non-conference game. ^{#}Rankings from AP Poll. (#) Tournament seedings in parentheses. All times are in Mountain.
