= 2025–26 Montana State Bobcats women's basketball team =

American college basketball season

2025–26 Montana State Bobcats women's basketball
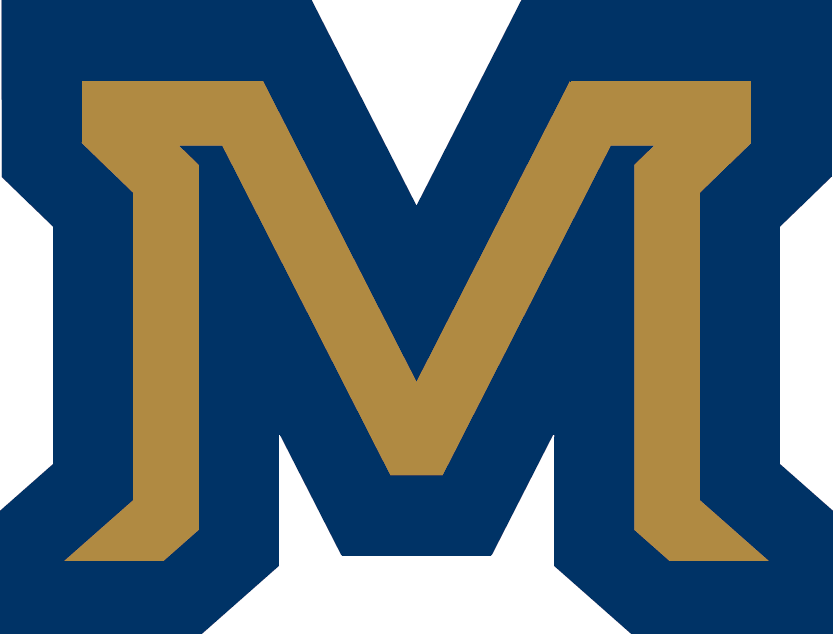

WNIT, Great 8
- Conference: Big Sky Conference
- Record: 27–8 (16–2 Big Sky)
- Head coach: Tricia Binford (21st season)
- Assistant coaches: Sunny Smallwood; Ryan Johnson; Devin Perez
- Home arena: Worthington Arena

2025–26 Big Sky women's basketball standings
	Conf.				Overall
Team	W		L	PCT	W		L	PCT
Idaho †	17	–	1	.944	29	–	6	.829
Montana State	16	–	2	.889	27	–	8	.771
Northern Colorado	13	–	5	.722	23	–	11	.676
Idaho State	12	–	6	.667	19	–	11	.633
Sacramento State	8	–	10	.444	15	–	18	.455
Eastern Washington	7	–	11	.389	15	–	18	.455
Northern Arizona	6	–	12	.333	10	–	22	.313
Montana	5	–	13	.278	9	–	22	.290
Weber State	4	–	14	.222	11	–	22	.333
Portland State	2	–	16	.111	6	–	25	.194
† 2026 Big Sky tournament winner

The 2025–26 Montana State Bobcats women's basketball team represents Montana State University during the 2025–26 NCAA Division I women's basketball season. The Bobcats, led by 21st-year head coach Tricia Binford, play their home games at Worthington Arena in Bozeman, Montana, as members of the Big Sky Conference.

== Previous season ==
The Bobcats finished the 2024–25 season 30–4, 17–1 in Big Sky play, to finish as Big Sky regular season champions. They defeated Northern Colorado, Idaho State, and Montana to win the Big Sky tournament championship, sending the Bobcats to their first NCAA tournament appearance since 2022. In the tournament, they would receive the No. 13 seed in the Birmingham Regional 3, where they would be defeated by No. 4 seed Ohio State in the First Round.

== Preseason ==
On October 22, 2025, the Big Sky Conference released their preseason coaches and media poll. Montana State was picked to finish atop the conference in both the coaches poll, with five first-place votes, and the media poll, with eleven first-place votes.

=== Preseason rankings ===
Big Sky Preseason Coaches' Poll
Place	Team	Votes
1	Montana State	74 (5)
2	Montana	72 (3)
3	Idaho	65 (1)
4	Idaho State	57 (1)
5	Sacramento State	50
6	Eastern Washington	38
7	Northern Colorado	36
8	Weber State	28
T-9	Northern Arizona	15
T-9	Portland State	15
(#) first-place votes

Big Sky Preseason Media Poll
Place	Team	Votes
1	Montana State	238 (11)
2	Montana	224 (7)
3	Idaho	220 (7)
4	Sacramento State	177 (2)
5	Idaho State	161
6	Eastern Washington	123
7	Weber State	120
8	Northern Arizona	102
9	Northern Colorado	86
10	Portland State	34
(#) first-place votes

=== Preseason All-Big Sky Team ===
Preseason All-Big Sky Team
Player	Year	Position
Taylee Chirrick	Sophomore	Guard

== Roster ==
2025–26 Montana State Bobcats women's basketball team
Players
Coaches

Pos.	#	Name	Height	Year	Previous school	Hometown
G	2	Courtney Smith	6 ft 1 in (1.85 m)	RS Fr	Toledo	London, Ontario
F	5	Ella Johnson	6 ft 2 in (1.88 m)	Jr	Elk River High School	Elk River, Minnesota
G	9	Heidi Smith	6 ft 1 in (1.85 m)	RS Fr	Toledo	London, Ontario
G	12	Jamison Philip	5 ft 7 in (1.7 m)	Fr	Ellensburg High School	Ellensburg, Washington
G	13	Grace Hintz	5 ft 8 in (1.73 m)	Fr	Lynden Christian Schools	Lynden, Washington
G	15	Isobel Bunyan	6 ft 0 in (1.83 m)	Jr	Cardiff Met Archers	Tonyrefail, Wales
G	20	Brooke Fatupaito	6 ft 0 in (1.83 m)	RS Jr	New Mexico	Billings, Montana
G	21	Brianne Bailey	5 ft 10 in (1.78 m)	Fr	South Fremont High School	St. Anthony, Idaho
F	23	Teagan Erickson	6 ft 2 in (1.88 m)	So	Saco High School	Saco, Montana
G	24	Kadynce Couture	5 ft 8 in (1.73 m)	Fr	Big Sky High School	Missoula, Montana
G	30	Dylan Philip	5 ft 8 in (1.73 m)	RS Jr	Ellensburg High School	Ellensburg, Washington
F	33	Addison Harris	6 ft 1 in (1.85 m)	So	Camas High School	Camas, Washington
G	44	Taylee Chirrick	5 ft 11 in (1.8 m)	So	Roberts High School	Roberts, Montana
F		Drea Brumfield	6 ft 2 in (1.88 m)	RS Jr	Pepperdine	Chehalis, Washington

Head coach

- Tricia Binford (Boise State)

Assistant coach(es)

- Sunny Smallwood (Boise State)
- Ryan Johnson (DePauw)
- Devin Perez (Ottawa)

Legend

- (C) Team captain
- (S) Suspended
- (I) Ineligible
- (W) Walk-on
- Injured
- Current redshirt

Roster
Last update: January 27, 2026

== Schedule and results ==
Date time, TV	Rank^{#}	Opponent^{#}	Result	Record	High points	High rebounds	High assists	Site (attendance) city, state
Non-conference regular season
November 4, 2025*; 7:00 pm, ESPN+		Carroll	W 93–41	1–0	27 – Harris	9 – Couture	4 – Bailey	Worthington Arena (1,717); Bozeman, MT
November 7, 2025*; 7:00 pm, ESPN+		at Portland	W 86–72	2–0	23 – Chirrick	9 – Fatupaito	7 – Chirrick	Chiles Center (851); Portland, OR
November 10, 2025*; 11:00 am, ESPN+		Minot State	W 73–37	3–0	19 – Chirrick	8 – Johnson	5 – J. Philip	Worthington Arena (4,877); Bozeman, MT
November 18, 2025*; 7:00 pm, ESPN+		UNLV	W 94–81	4–0	26 – Harris	10 – Tied	9 – J. Philip	Worthington Arena (1,777); Bozeman, MT
November 24, 2025*; 5:00 pm, ESPN+		at Troy	L 60−74	4−1	21 – Chirrick	9 – Chirrick	4 – Chirrick	Trojan Arena (1,152); Troy, AL
November 30, 2025*; 1:00 pm, ESPN+		at Colorado	W 71−70	5−1	21 – Chirrick	6 – Tied	3 – Chirrick	CU Events Center (2,206); Boulder, CO
December 3, 2025*; 6:00 pm, CBSSN		at North Dakota State; Big Sky/Summit League Challenge	L 65–90	5–2	22 – Bunyan	6 – Chirrick	5 – Tied	Scheels Center (1,014); Fargo, ND
December 6, 2025*; 6:00 pm, ESPN+		North Dakota; Big Sky/Summit League Challenge	W 99–57	6–2	27 – Erickson	10 – Chirrick	10 – Chirrick	Worthington Arena (1,877); Bozeman, MT
December 14, 2025*; 1:00 pm, B1G+		at Oregon	L 44–69	6–3	14 – J. Philip	6 – Chirrick	2 – Tied	Matthew Knight Arena (4,169); Eugene, OR
December 19, 2025*; 8:00 pm, YouTube		vs. Oregon State; Maui Classic	L 51–53	6–4	14 – J. Philip	8 – Chirrick	3 – Tied	Seabury Hall; Makawao, HI
December 20, 2025*; 6:30 pm, YouTube		vs. Hawai'i; Maui Classic	W 72–56	7–4	26 – Chirrick	8 – Chirrick	3 – J. Philip	Seabury Hall; Makawao, HI
Big Sky regular season
January 1, 2026; 6:00 pm, ESPN+		at Northern Colorado	W 86−79	8−4 (1–0)	21 – Bunyan	7 – Chirrick	5 – J. Philip	Bank of Colorado Arena (685); Greeley, CO
January 3, 2026; 2:00 pm, ESPN+		at Northern Arizona	W 82–65	9–4 (2–0)	27 – Chirrick	10 – Johnson	5 – Bailey	Findlay Toyota Court (246); Flagstaff, AZ
January 8, 2026; 7:00 pm, ESPN+		Eastern Washington	W 72–70	10–4 (3–0)	24 – Chirrick	8 – Chirrick	6 – Chirrick	Worthington Arena (1,673); Bozeman, MT
January 10, 2026; 2:00 pm, ESPN+		Idaho	W 99–66	11–4 (4–0)	23 – Chirrick	7 – Chirrick	6 – J. Philip	Worthington Arena (2,145); Bozeman, MT
January 17, 2026; 2:00 pm, The Spot-MTN/ESPN+		Montana	W 82–44	12–4 (5–0)	23 – J. Philip	8 – Johnson	3 – Tied	Worthington Arena (4,173); Bozeman, MT
January 19, 2026; 7:00 pm, ESPN+		Northern Colorado	W 71–57	13–4 (6–0)	23 – Harris	6 – Johnson	4 – Tied	Worthington Arena (1,671); Bozeman, MT
January 22, 2026; 7:00 pm, ESPN+		at Idaho State	L 60–79	13–5 (6–1)	18 – Harris	8 – Chirrick	5 – Chirrick	Reed Gym (1,011); Pocatello, ID
January 24, 2026; 2:00 pm, ESPN+		at Weber State	W 92–72	14–5 (7–1)	24 – Chirrick	7 – Chirrick	5 – Chirrick	Dee Events Center (589); Ogden, UT
January 29, 2026; 7:00 pm, ESPN+		Sacramento State	W 66–31	15–5 (8–1)	14 – Harris	7 – Chirrick	5 – Chirrick	Worthington Arena (2,148); Bozeman, MT
January 31, 2026; 2:00 pm, ESPN+		Portland State	W 91–42	16–5 (9–1)	31 – Chirrick	12 – Chirrick	4 – Bunyan	Worthington Arena (2,472); Bozeman, MT
February 5, 2026; 7:00 pm, ESPN+		at Idaho	L 70–73 ^{OT}	16–6 (9–2)	15 – Tied	8 – Erickson	7 – Chirrick	ICCU Arena (1,773); Moscow, ID
February 7, 2026; 3:00 pm, ESPN+		at Eastern Washington	W 71–69	17–6 (10–2)	18 – Chirrick	10 – Chirrick	5 – Bailey	Reese Court (700); Cheney, WA
February 14, 2026; 2:00 pm, ESPN+		at Montana	W 72–55	18–6 (11–2)	17 – Johnson	6 – Tied	3 – Chirrick	Dahlberg Arena (3,149); Missoula, MT
February 19, 2026; 7:00 pm, ESPN+		Weber State	W 81–36	19–6 (12–2)	20 – Chirrick	5 – Tied	5 – Johnson	Worthington Arena (1,851); Bozeman, MT
February 21, 2026; 2:00 pm, ESPN+		Idaho State	W 67–61	20–6 (13–2)	21 – Philip	8 – Chirrick	4 – Chirrick	Worthington Arena (2,645); Bozeman, MT
February 26, 2026; 8:00 pm, ESPN+		at Portland State	W 66–63	21–6 (14–2)	22 – Chirrick	8 – Chirrick	3 – Tied	Viking Pavilion (500); Portland, OR
February 28, 2026; 3:00 pm, ESPN+		at Sacramento State	W 61–54	22–6 (15–2)	22 – Harris	8 – Chirrick	3 – Tied	Hornet Pavilion (703); Sacramento, CA
March 2, 2026; 7:00 pm, ESPN+		Northern Arizona	W 68–48	23–6 (16–2)	16 – Chirrick	9 – Johnson	3 – Tied	Worthington Arena (2,283); Bozeman, MT
Big Sky tournament
March 8, 2026; 2:30 p.m., ESPN+	(2)	vs. (8) Montana; Quarterfinals	W 78–57	24–6	13 – Tied	10 – Chirrick	6 – Chirrick	Idaho Central Arena (750); Boise, ID
March 10, 2026; 2:30 p.m., ESPN+	(2)	vs. (6) Eastern Washington; Semifinals	W 79–77 ^{OT}	25–6	26 – Chirrick	7 – Harris	4 – Philip	Idaho Central Arena; Boise, ID
March 11, 2026; 3:00 p.m., ESPNU	(2)	vs. (1) Idaho; Championship	L 57–60	25–7	12 – Chirrick	6 – Johnson	3 – Chirrick	Idaho Central Arena; Boise, ID
WNIT
March 22, 2026*; 2:00 p.m., ESPN+		San Francisco; Second round	W 69–53	26–7	15 – Chirrick	9 – Chirrick	4 – Harris	Worthington Arena (2,238); Bozeman, MT
March 26, 2026*; 7:00 p.m.		Portland; Super 16	W 72–54	27–7	23 – Harris	13 – Chirrick	5 – Chirrick	Worthington Arena (3,897); Bozeman, MT
March 29, 2026*; 12:00 p.m.		at South Dakota; Great 8	L 56–65	27–8	23 – Chirrick	9 – Harris	4 – Philip	Sanford Coyote Sports Center (2,375); Vermillion, SD
*Non-conference game. ^{#}Rankings from AP Poll. (#) Tournament seedings in parentheses. All times are in Mountain.
