= 2025–26 Montana Lady Griz basketball team =

American college basketball season

2025–26 Montana Lady Griz basketball
- Conference: Big Sky Conference
- Record: 9–22 (5–13 Big Sky)
- Head coach: Nate Harris (1st season)
- Assistant coaches: Lindsay Woolley; Emma List; Kayla Anderson
- Home arena: Dahlberg Arena

2025–26 Big Sky women's basketball standings
	Conf.				Overall
Team	W		L	PCT	W		L	PCT
Idaho †	17	–	1	.944	29	–	6	.829
Montana State	16	–	2	.889	27	–	8	.771
Northern Colorado	13	–	5	.722	23	–	11	.676
Idaho State	12	–	6	.667	19	–	11	.633
Sacramento State	8	–	10	.444	15	–	18	.455
Eastern Washington	7	–	11	.389	15	–	18	.455
Northern Arizona	6	–	12	.333	10	–	22	.313
Montana	5	–	13	.278	9	–	22	.290
Weber State	4	–	14	.222	11	–	22	.333
Portland State	2	–	16	.111	6	–	25	.194
† 2026 Big Sky tournament winner

The 2025–26 Montana Lady Griz basketball team represents the University of Montana during the 2025–26 NCAA Division I women's basketball season. The Lady Griz, led by first-year head coach Nate Harris, play their home games at Dahlberg Arena in Missoula, Montana as members of the Big Sky Conference.

== Previous season ==
The Lady Griz finished the 2024–25 season 14–18, 8–10 in Big Sky play to finish in tie for fifth place. They defeated Idaho and Northern Arizona in the quarterfinals and semifinals of the Big Sky tournament before losing in the championship game to their in state rival Montana State.

== Offseason ==
=== Departures ===
Montana departures
Name	Number	Pos.	Height	Year	Hometown	Reason for departure
Tyler McCliment-Call	5	G	6'0"	Graduate Student	Spokane, WA	Graduated
Izabella Zingaro	13	F	6'4"	(redshirt) Junior	Bolton, ON	Transferred to Cleveland State
Imogen Greenslade	15	C	6'4"	(redshirt) Senior	Sydney, Australia	Graduated
MJ Bruno	23	G	5'11"	Senior	Spokane, WA	Graduated
Alex Pirog	34	F	6'3"	Junior	Highlands Ranch, CO	Left the team
Dani Bartsch	40	F	6'2"	Senior	Helena, MT	Graduated

=== Incoming transfers ===
Montana incoming transfers
Name	Number	Pos.	Height	Year	Hometown	Previous school
Zoey Washington	0	G	5'8"	Junior	Mahtomedi, MI	St. Thomas
Kennedy Gillette	5	G	6'0"	Junior	Rexburg, ID	CIS
Ava Cossette	22	G	5'10"	(redshirt) Freshman	Maple Grove, MN	South Dakota
Jocelyn Land	23	G/F	6'0"	Sophomore	Chanhassen, MN	Butler
Maggie Hutka	24	F	6'1"	(redshirt) Junior	Royse City, TX	Colorado Christian

=== Recruiting classes ===
There was no recruiting class of 2025.

== Preseason ==
On October 22, 2025, the Big Sky Conference released their preseason coaches and media poll. Idaho was picked to finish second in both the coaches poll, with three first-place votes, and the media poll, with seven seven-place votes.

=== Preseason rankings ===
Big Sky Preseason Coaches' Poll
Place	Team	Votes
1	Montana State	74 (5)
2	Montana	72 (3)
3	Idaho	65 (1)
4	Idaho State	57 (1)
5	Sacramento State	50
6	Eastern Washington	38
7	Northern Colorado	36
8	Weber State	28
T-9	Northern Arizona	15
T-9	Portland State	15
(#) first-place votes

Big Sky Preseason Media Poll
Place	Team	Votes
1	Montana State	238 (11)
2	Montana	224 (7)
3	Idaho	220 (7)
4	Sacramento State	177 (2)
5	Idaho State	161
6	Eastern Washington	123
7	Weber State	120
8	Northern Arizona	102
9	Northern Colorado	86
10	Portland State	34
(#) first-place votes

=== Preseason All-Big Sky Team ===
Preseason All-Big Sky Team
Player	Year	Position
Mack Konig	Senior	Guard
Avery Waddington	Sophomore	Guard

== Roster ==
2025–26 Montana Lady Griz women's basketball team
Players
Coaches

Pos.	#	Name	Height	Year	Previous school	Hometown
G	0	Zoey Washington	5 ft 8 in (1.73 m)	Jr	St. Thomas	Mahtomedi, Minnesota
G	1	Macy Donarski	5 ft 8 in (1.73 m)	RS So	Aquinas High School	La Crosse, Wisconsin
G	2	Mack Konig	5 ft 9 in (1.75 m)	Sr	King's Christian Collegiate	Milton, Ontario
G	3	Draya Wacker	5 ft 8 in (1.73 m)	RS Jr	Melstone High School	Melstone, Montana
G	5	Kennedy Gillette	6 ft 0 in (1.83 m)	Jr	College of Southern Idaho	Rexburg, Idaho
G	10	Avery Waddington	6 ft 3 in (1.91 m)	So	Lake City High School	Coeur d'Alene, Idaho
G	11	Aby Shubert	5 ft 8 in (1.73 m)	Jr	Xavier	Kasson, Minnesota
G	12	Chloe Larsen	5 ft 10 in (1.78 m)	So	Hellgate High School	Missoula, Montana
G	14	Lauren Dick	5 ft 10 in (1.78 m)	RS Jr	Hellgate High School	Missoula, Montana
G	20	Rae Ehrman	5 ft 10 in (1.78 m)	Fr	Eden Prairie High School	Eden Prairie, Minnesota
G	22	Ava Cossette	5 ft 10 in (1.78 m)	RS Fr	South Dakota	Maple Grove, Minnesota
F	23	Jocelyn Land	6 ft 0 in (1.83 m)	So	Butler	Chanhassen, Minnesota
F	24	Maggie Hutka	6 ft 0 in (1.83 m)	RS Jr	Colorado Christian	Royse City, Texas
G	33	Adria Lincoln	6 ft 1 in (1.85 m)	Jr	Monroe High School	Monroe, Washington

Head coach

- Nate Harris (Montana Tech)

Assistant coach(es)

- Lindsay Woolley (Montana)
- Emma List (Florida Gulf Coast)
- Kayla Anderson (Utah Valley)

Legend

- (C) Team captain
- (S) Suspended
- (I) Ineligible
- (W) Walk-on
- Injured
- Current redshirt

Roster
Last update: January 30, 2025

== Schedule and results ==
Date time, TV	Rank^{#}	Opponent^{#}	Result	Record	High points	High rebounds	High assists	Site (attendance) city, state
Non-conference regular season
November 4, 2025*; 7:00 p.m., ESPN+		Seattle Pacific	W 81–44	1–0	20 – Waddington	8 – Waddington	5 – Konig	Dahlberg Arena (1,780); Missoula, MT
November 8, 2025*; 3:00 p.m., B1G+		at Oregon	L 47–90	1–1	23 – Konig	9 – Land	3 – Donarski	Matthew Knight Arena (4,296); Eugene, OR
November 10, 2025*; 7:00 p.m., B1G+		at No. 25 Washington	L 56–87	1–2	14 – Waddington	4 – Tied	5 – Waddington	Alaska Airlines Arena (1,918); Seattle, WA
November 15, 2025*; 6:00 p.m., SLN		vs. South Dakota State	L 71–95	1–3	24 – Land	6 – Waddington	5 – Konig	The Monument (2,639); Rapid City, SD
November 19, 2025*; 7:00 p.m., ESPN+		BYU	L 69–70	1–4	19 – Konig	13 – Waddington	4 – Konig	Dahlberg Arena (2,543); Missoula, MT
November 29, 2025*; 2:00 p.m., ESPN+		Utah	L 38–78	1–5	11 – Land	10 – Waddington	3 – Konig	Dahlberg Arena (2,359); Missoula, MT
December 3, 2025*; 6:00 p.m., SLN		at North Dakota; Big Sky–Summit Challenge	W 86–56	2–5	30 – Land	9 – Waddington	5 – Waddington	Betty Engelstad Sioux Center (1,375); Grand Forks, ND
December 6, 2025*; 7:00 p.m., ESPN+		at St. Thomas; Big Sky–Summit Challenge	L 65–81	2–6	21 – Waddington	5 – Waddington	4 – Konig	Dahlberg Arena (1,831); Missoula, MT
December 16, 2025*; 10:00 a.m., ESPN+		at Houston	L 54–60	2–7	15 – Land	8 – Waddington	3 – Konig	Fertitta Center (1,523); Houston, TX
December 19, 2025*; 4:30 p.m., ESPN+		at Abilene Christian; ACU Christmas Classic	L 48–60	2–8	13 – Waddington	9 – Land	3 – Waddington	Moody Coliseum (775); Abilene, TX
December 20, 2025*; 12:00 p.m., WAC International		vs. Tarleton State; ACU Christmas Classic	W 90–85 ^{OT}	3–8	35 – Konig	10 – Waddington	4 – Konig	Moody Coliseum (123); Abilene, TX
Big Sky regular season
January 1, 2026; 6:00 p.m., ESPN+		at Northern Arizona	L 72–81	3–9 (0–1)	27 – Konig	8 – Waddington	5 – Konig	Findlay Toyota Court (263); Flagstaff, AZ
January 3, 2026; 2:00 p.m., ESPN+		at Northern Colorado	L 58–77	3–10 (0–2)	19 – Konig	6 – Tied	5 – Konig	Bank of Colorado Arena (740); Greeley, CO
January 8, 2026; 7:00 p.m., ESPN+		Idaho	L 50–67	3–11 (0–3)	15 – Land	6 – Shubert	2 – Tied	Dahlberg Arena (1,892); Missoula, MT
January 10, 2026; 2:00 p.m., ESPN+		Eastern Washington	L 58–65	3–12 (0–4)	16 – Waddington	10 – Waddington	4 – Waddington	Dahlberg Arena (2,234); Missoula, MT
January 17, 2026; 2:00 p.m., The Spot-MTN/ESPN+		at Montana State	L 44–82	3–13 (0–5)	8 – Shubert	8 – Waddington	3 – Waddington	Worthington Arena (4,173); Bozeman, MT
January 19, 2026; 2:00 p.m., ESPN+		Northern Arizona	W 76–72	4–13 (1–5)	20 – Land	10 – Waddington	6 – Wacker	Dahlberg Arena (2,449); Missoula, MT
January 22, 2026; 7:00 p.m., ESPN+		at Weber State	W 51–50	5–13 (2–5)	20 – Waddington	8 – Waddington	3 – Waddington	Dee Events Center (373); Ogden, UT
January 24, 2026; 2:00 p.m., ESPN+		at Idaho State	W 70–67 ^{OT}	6–13 (3–5)	21 – Ehrman	7 – Waddington	5 – Waddington	Reed Gym (373); Pocatello, ID
January 29, 2026; 7:00 p.m., ESPN+		Portland State	W 69–63	7–13 (4–5)	31 – Waddington	10 – Waddington	2 – Wacker	Dahlberg Arena (2,159); Missoula, MT
January 31, 2026; 2:00 p.m., ESPN+		Sacramento State	L 57–64	7–14 (4–6)	16 – Waddington	5 – Tied	3 – Waddington	Dahlberg Arena (2,751); Missoula, MT
February 5, 2026; 7:00 p.m., ESPN+		at Eastern Washington	L 72–76	7–15 (4–7)	18 – Waddington	7 – Wacker	5 – Waddington	Reese Court (600); Cheney, WA
February 7, 2026; 3:00 p.m., ESPN+		at Idaho	L 65–89	7–16 (4–8)	28 – Konig	7 – Waddington	4 – Tied	ICCU Arena (1,588); Moscow, ID
February 14, 2026; 2:00 p.m., ESPN+/Scripps		Montana State	L 55–72	7–17 (4–9)	12 – Gillette	4 – Tied	3 – Tied	Dahlberg Arena (3,149); Missoula, MT
February 19, 2026; 7:00 p.m., ESPN+		Idaho State	L 54–71	7–18 (4–10)	18 – Waddington	5 – Shubert	2 – Tied	Dahlberg Arena (1,825); Missoula, MT
February 21, 2026; 2:00 p.m., ESPN+		Weber State	L 79–86 ^{OT}	7–19 (4–11)	14 – Waddington	6 – Tied	5 – Tied	Dahlberg Arena (2,373); Missoula, MT
February 26, 2026; 7:30 p.m., ESPN+		at Sacramento State	L 57–75	7–20 (4–12)	21 – Land	7 – Land	6 – Waddington	Colberg Court (1,525); Sacramento, CA
February 28, 2026; 3:00 p.m., ESPN+		at Portland State	W 55–53	8–20 (5–12)	29 – Waddington	10 – Gillette	4 – Waddington	Viking Pavilion (603); Portland, OR
March 2, 2026; 7:00 p.m., ESPN+		Northern Colorado	L 59–61	8–21 (5–13)	19 – Tied	8 – Land	5 – Waddington	Dahlberg Arena (1,964); Missoula, MT
Big Sky tournament
March 7, 2026; 2:30 p.m., ESPN+	(8)	vs. (7) Northern Arizona; First round	W 61–60	9–21	17 – Konig	9 – Gillette	5 – Konig	Idaho Central Arena (750); Boise, ID
March 8, 2026; 2:30 p.m., ESPN+	(8)	vs. (2) Montana State; Quarterfinals	L 57–78	9–22	17 – Ehrman	6 – Gillette	4 – Donarski	Idaho Central Arena (750); Boise, ID
*Non-conference game. ^{#}Rankings from AP Poll. (#) Tournament seedings in parentheses. All times are in Mountain.
