= 2025–26 Eastern Washington Eagles women's basketball team =

American college basketball season

2025–26 Eastern Washington Eagles women's basketball
- Conference: Big Sky Conference
- Record: 15-18 (7-11 Big Sky)
- Head coach: Joddie Gleason (5th season)
- Associate head coach: Skip Gleason
- Assistant coaches: Dora Goles; Brynna Maxwell; Jaela Eggers
- Home arena: Reese Court

2025–26 Big Sky women's basketball standings
	Conf.				Overall
Team	W		L	PCT	W		L	PCT
Idaho †	17	–	1	.944	29	–	6	.829
Montana State	16	–	2	.889	27	–	8	.771
Northern Colorado	13	–	5	.722	23	–	11	.676
Idaho State	12	–	6	.667	19	–	11	.633
Sacramento State	8	–	10	.444	15	–	18	.455
Eastern Washington	7	–	11	.389	15	–	18	.455
Northern Arizona	6	–	12	.333	10	–	22	.313
Montana	5	–	13	.278	9	–	22	.290
Weber State	4	–	14	.222	11	–	22	.333
Portland State	2	–	16	.111	6	–	25	.194
† 2026 Big Sky tournament winner

The 2025–26 Eastern Washington Eagles women's basketball team represents Eastern Washington University during the 2025–26 NCAA Division I women's basketball season. The Eagles, led by fifth-year head coach Joddie Gleason, play their home games at Reese Court in Cheney, Washington as members of the Big Sky Conference.

== Previous season ==
The Eagles finished the 2024–25 season 11–20, 7–11 in Big Sky play, to finish in a tie for seventh place. They were defeated by Sacramento State in the first round of the Big Sky tournament.

== Preseason ==
On October 22, 2025, the Big Sky Conference released their preseason coaches and media poll. Eastern Washington was picked to finish sixth in both the coaches poll and the media poll.

=== Preseason rankings ===
Big Sky Preseason Coaches' Poll
Place	Team	Votes
1	Montana State	74 (5)
2	Montana	72 (3)
3	Idaho	65 (1)
4	Idaho State	57 (1)
5	Sacramento State	50
6	Eastern Washington	38
7	Northern Colorado	36
8	Weber State	28
T-9	Northern Arizona	15
T-9	Portland State	15
(#) first-place votes

Big Sky Preseason Media Poll
Place	Team	Votes
1	Montana State	238 (11)
2	Montana	224 (7)
3	Idaho	220 (7)
4	Sacramento State	177 (2)
5	Idaho State	161
6	Eastern Washington	123
7	Weber State	120
8	Northern Arizona	102
9	Northern Colorado	86
10	Portland State	34
(#) first-place votes

=== Preseason All-Big Sky Team ===
Preseason All-Big Sky Team
Player	Year	Position
Kourtney Grossman	Sophomore	Forward

== Roster ==
2025–26 Eastern Washington Eagles women's basketball team
Players
Coaches

Pos.	#	Name	Height	Year	Previous school	Hometown
G	1	Elyn Bowers	5 ft 8 in (1.73 m)	Fr	Pinedale High School	Pinedale, Wyoming
G	2	Ella Gallatin	5 ft 10 in (1.78 m)	Sr	Snohomish High School	Snohomish, Washington
G	3	Madeline Gibbs	5 ft 11 in (1.8 m)	Fr	Cherokee Trail High School	Aurora, Colorado
G	4	Autumn Agnew	5 ft 8 in (1.73 m)	Jr	Salt Lake Community College	Spokane Valley, Washington
F	10	Jaecy Eggers	6 ft 2 in (1.88 m)	So	Woodinville High School	Woodinville, Washington
G	11	Dylyn Dress	5 ft 10 in (1.78 m)	Fr	Kennewick High School	Kennewick, Washington
F	12	Paris Kirk	6 ft 2 in (1.88 m)	Sr	Robert Morris	Kelowna, British Columbia
G	13	Caitie Gingras	5 ft 9 in (1.75 m)	RS So	Cal State Bakersfield	Vernon, British Columbia
G	15	Emma Myers	5 ft 11 in (1.8 m)	Fr	Ridgeline High School	Spokane Valley, Washington
G	21	Léa-line Romain	5 ft 10 in (1.78 m)	So	Santa Margarita Catholic High School	Paris, France
F	22	Kourtney Grossman	6 ft 0 in (1.83 m)	So	Billings West High School	Billings, Montana
G	23	Emily McElmurry	5 ft 9 in (1.75 m)	So	Sentinel High School	Missoula, Montana
G	24	Brielle Magnuson	5 ft 10 in (1.78 m)	Jr	Walla Walla Community College	Meridian, Idaho
F	41	Addison Hall	5 ft 10 in (1.78 m)	Sr	Winlock Senior High School	Winlock, Washington
F	44	Camille Jentzsch	6 ft 3 in (1.91 m)	RS So	Lake Stevens High School	Lake Stevens, Washington
C	52	Bella Hays	6 ft 4 in (1.93 m)	RS Jr	Wasilla High School	Wasilla, Alaska

Head coach

- Joddie Gleason (Chico State)

Assistant coach(es)

- Skip Gleason (Chico State)
- Dora Goles (Idaho State)
- Brynna Maxwell (Gonzaga)
- Jaela Eggers (George Fox)

Legend

- (C) Team captain
- (S) Suspended
- (I) Ineligible
- (W) Walk-on
- Injured
- Current redshirt

Roster
Last update: January 30, 2026

== Schedule and results ==
Date time, TV	Rank^{#}	Opponent^{#}	Result	Record	High points	High rebounds	High assists	Site (attendance) city, state
Exhibition
October 29, 2025*; 6:00 pm		Whitworth	W 85–35	–	17 – Tied	11 – Grossman	–	Reese Court; Cheney, WA
Non-conference regular season
November 3, 2025*; 6:00 pm, ESPN+		Northwest	W 99–43	1–0	21 – Gallatin	8 – Grossman	4 – Bowers	Reese Court (500); Cheney, WA
November 8, 2025*; 1:00 pm, ESPN+		at Arizona State	L 58–73	1–1	15 – Bowers	9 – Grossman	4 – Gallatin	Desert Financial Arena (2,261); Tempe, AZ
November 13, 2025*; 6:00 pm, ESPN+		Southern Utah	L 68–74	1–2	21 – Eggers	11 – Grossman	3 – Gallatin	Reese Court (500); Cheney, WA
November 17, 2025*; 5:00 pm, ESPN+		Cal Poly	W 78–67	2–2	19 – Bowers	10 – Grossman	4 – Gallatin	Reese Court (620); Cheney, WA
November 23, 2025*; 2:00 pm, ESPN+		at Gonzaga	L 60–79	2–3	21 – Bowers	7 – Grossman	4 – Gallatin	McCarthey Athletic Center (5,018); Spokane, WA
November 28, 2025*; 5:00 pm, ESPN+		vs. Nevada; Portland Invitational	W 58−57	3−3	15 – Grossman	9 – Bowers	3 – Tied	Chiles Center (335); Portland, OR
November 30, 2025*; 3:00 pm, ESPN+		at Portland; Portland Invitational	L 58−73	3−4	19 – Gallatin	8 – Tied	3 – Tied	Chiles Center (421); Portland, OR
December 3, 2025*; 6:00 pm, ESPN+		Denver; Big Sky—Summit League Challenge	W 66–65	4–4	26 – Eggers	23 – Grossman	3 – Tied	Reese Court (490); Cheney, WA
December 6, 2025*; 11:00 am, SLN		at South Dakota; Big Sky—Summit League Challenge	W 67–63	5–4	24 – Eggers	17 – Grossman	3 – Bowers	Sanford Coyote Sports Center (1,261); Vermillion, SD
December 10, 2025*; 6:00 pm, ESPN+		at Washington State	W 71–69	6–4	22 – Gallatin	18 – Grossman	4 – Bowers	Beasley Coliseum (925); Pullman, WA
December 18, 2025*; 6:00 pm, ESPN+		at UC Santa Barbara	L 63–89	6–5	17 – Grossman	12 – Grossman	6 – Bowers	The Thunderdome (527); Santa Barbara, CA
December 20, 2025*; 2:00 pm, ESPN+		at Cal State Bakersfield	L 72–85	6–6	21 – Grossman	17 – Grossman	3 – Bowers	Icardo Center (81); Bakersfield, CA
December 29, 2025*; 6:00 pm, ESPN+		Bushnell	W 78−37	7−6	17 – Grossman	13 – Eggers	5 – McElmurry	Reese Court (627); Cheney, WA
Big Sky regular season
January 3, 2026; 2:00 pm, ESPN+/SWX		Idaho	L 63–69	7–7 (0–1)	20 – Bowers	22 – Grossman	2 – Tied	Reese Court (712); Cheney, WA
January 8, 2026; 6:00 pm, ESPN+		at Montana State	L 70–72 ^{OT}	7–8 (0–2)	18 – Gallatin	17 – Eggers	6 – Gallatin	Worthington Arena (1,673); Bozeman, MT
January 10, 2026; 1:00 pm, ESPN+		at Montana	W 65–58	8–8 (1–2)	20 – Gallatin	17 – Grossman	3 – Gallatin	Dahlberg Arena (2,234); Missoula, MT
January 15, 2026; 6:00 pm, ESPN+		Weber State	W 73–58	9–8 (2–2)	20 – Eggers	14 – Grossman	3 – Tied	Reese Court (579); Cheney, WA
January 17, 2026; 2:00 pm, SWX/ESPN+		Idaho State	L 57–66	9–9 (2–3)	22 – Gallatin	16 – Grossman	4 – Bowers	Reese Court (663); Cheney, WA
January 22, 2026; 7:00 pm, ESPN+		at Portland State	W 81–63	10–9 (3–3)	21 – Bowers	13 – Grossman	3 – Tied	Viking Pavilion (472); Portland, OR
January 24, 2026; 2:00 pm, ESPN+		at Sacramento State	L 54–61	10–10 (3–4)	17 – Gallatin	10 – Grossman	5 – Gallatin	Hornet Pavilion (607); Sacramento, CA
January 29, 2026; 2:00 pm, ESPN+		at Northern Arizona	W 93–87	11–10 (4–4)	26 – Bowers	13 – Grossman	5 – Gallatin	Findlay Toyota Court (179); Flagstaff, AZ
January 31, 2026; 2:00 pm, ESPN+		Northern Colorado	L 62-71	11-11 (4-5)	26 – Bowers	11 – Grossman	4 – Grossman	Reese Court (622); Cheney, WA
February 5, 2026; 6:00 pm, ESPN+		Montana	W 76-72	12-11 (5-5)	21 – Grossman	15 – Grossman	8 – Bowers	Reese Court (600); Cheney, WA
February 7, 2026; 2:00 pm, SWX/ESPN+		Montana State	L 69-71	12-12 (5-6)	18 – Gallatin	14 – Grossman	3 – Tied	Reese Court (700); Cheney, WA
February 12, 2026; 6:00 pm, ESPN+		at Idaho State	L 65-77	12-13 (5-7)	20 – Gallatin	11 – Grossman	3 – Bowers	Reed Gym (1,024); Pocatello, ID
February 14, 2026; 1:00 pm, ESPN+		at Weber State	L 72-74	12-14 (5-8)	26 – Gallatin	14 – Eggers	3 – Tied	Dee Events Center (581); Ogden, UT
February 19, 2026; 11:00 am, ESPN+		Sacramento State	L 60-69	12-15 (5-9)	20 – Grossman	8 – Grossman	6 – Gallatin	Reese Court (2,689); Cheney, WA
February 21, 2026; 2:00 pm, ESPN+		Portland State	W 87–78	13–15 (6–9)	25 – Gallatin	16 – Grossman	10 – Gallatin	Reese Court (570); Cheney, WA
February 26, 2026; 5:00 pm, ESPN+		at Northern Colorado	L 65–70	13–16 (6–10)	16 – Bowers	12 – Grossman	3 – Eggers	Bank of Colorado Arena (920); Greeley, CO
February 28, 2026; 3:30 pm, ESPN+		Northern Arizona	W 81–61	14–16 (7–10)	21 – Bowers	12 – Grossman	7 – Gallatin	Reese Court (852); Cheney, WA
March 2, 2026; 6:00 pm, ESPN+		at Idaho	L 64–75	14–17 (7–11)	26 – Gallatin	17 – Grossman	4 – Gallatin	ICCU Arena (1,395); Moscow, ID
Big Sky tournament
March 9, 2026; 1:30 pm, ESPN+	(6)	vs. (3) Northern Colorado; Quarterfinals	W 55–53	15–17	11 – Tied	11 – Eggers	4 – Gallatin	Idaho Central Arena; Boise, ID
March 10, 2026; 1:30 pm, ESPN+	(6)	vs. (2) Montana State; Semifinals	L 77–79 ^{OT}	15–18	23 – Bowers	9 – Tied	4 – Gallatin	Idaho Central Arena; Boise, ID
*Non-conference game. ^{#}Rankings from AP Poll. (#) Tournament seedings in parentheses. All times are in Pacific.
