= Arthur Moreira =

Brazilian basketball coach

Current position
- Title: Head coach
- Team: Idaho
- Conference: Big Sky
- Record: 47–18 (.723)

Coaching career (HC unless noted)

Men's basketball
- 2015–2016: Sonoma State (assistant)

Women's basketball
- 2016–2023: San Francisco (assistant)
- 2023–2024: Idaho (associate HC)
- 2024–present: Idaho

Head coaching record
- Overall: 47–18 (.723)
- Tournaments: 0–1 (NCAA)

Accomplishments and honors

Championships
- Big Sky regular season (2026); Big Sky tournament (2026)

Awards
- Big Sky Coach of the Year (2026)

Arthur Moreira is a Brazilian basketball coach who is the current head coach of the Idaho Vandals women's basketball team. He is the first Brazilian to coach an NCAA Division I basketball team.

== Career ==
On 25 June 2024, Moreira was named head coach at Idaho, the 11th in program history.

== Head coaching record ==
Statistics overview
Season	Team	Overall	Conference	Standing	Postseason
Idaho Vandals (Big Sky) (2024–present)
2024–25	Idaho	18–12	10–8	T-3rd	
2025–26	Idaho	29–6	17–1	1st	NCAA First Round
Idaho:		47–18 (.723)	27–9 (.750)		
Total:		47–18 (.723)			
National champion Postseason invitational champion Conference regular season champion Conference regular season and conference tournament champion Division regular season champion Division regular season and conference tournament champion Conference tournament champion
