= Northern Colorado Bears women's basketball =

Northern Colorado Bears
2026–27 Northern Colorado Bears women's basketball team
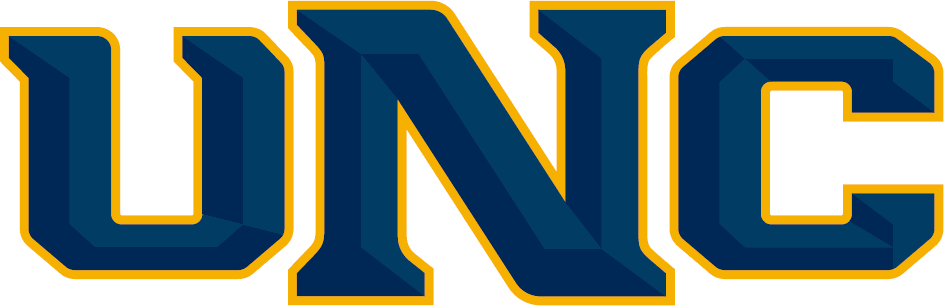
- University: University of Northern Colorado
- Head coach: Kristen Mattio (6th season)
- Location: Greeley, Colorado
- Arena: Bank of Colorado Arena (capacity: 2,992)
- Conference: Big Sky
- Nickname: Bears
- Colors: Blue and gold

NCAA Division I tournament second round
- Division II: 1998, 2000

NCAA Division I tournament appearances
- Division I: 2018; Division II: 1995, 1996, 1997, 1998, 2000, 2002

Conference tournament champions
- 2018

Conference regular-season champions
- 2018

The Northern Colorado Bears women's basketball team is the basketball team that represents the University of Northern Colorado (UNC) in Greeley, Colorado, United States. The school's team currently competes in the Big Sky Conference.

== History ==
Northern Colorado began play in 1970, though records only go back to 1974. They were members of the Intermountain Athletic Conference (IAC) from 1975 to 1982, the Continental Divide Conference (CDC) from 1982 to 1989, and the North Central Conference (NCC) from 1989 to 2003 before being reclassified to Division I in 2003. They joined the Big Sky Conference in 2006. They played in the WBI in 2011 and the WNIT in 2012, 2013, 2015, and 2019. They made their first NCAA Tournament appearance in 2018. As of the end of the 2020–21 season, the Bears have an all-time record of 661–644.

== Division I Season-by-Season Results ==
Record table
Season	Coach	Overall	Conference	Standing	Postseason
Ron Vlasin (Independent) (2003–2006)
2003-04	Ron Vlasin	16-11			Independent during transition from DII to DI
2004-05	Ron Vlasin	12-16			
2005-06	Ron Vlasin	13-15			
Ron Vlasin Win–loss Total:		41-42			
Jaime White (Big Sky) (2006–2014)
2006-07	Jaime White	5-24	2-14		
2007-08	Jaime White	14-16	8-8		
2008-09	Jaime White	12-18	5-11		
2009-10	Jaime White	14-16	6-10		
2010-11	Jaime White	17-14	12-4		WBI
2011-12	Jaime White	20-12	11-5		WNIT
2012-13	Jaime White	21-13	15-5		WNIT
2013-14	Jaime White	14-15	8-12		
Jaime White Win–loss Total:		117-128			
Kamie Ethridge (Big Sky) (2014–2019)
2014-15	Kamie Ethridge	22-13	12-6		WNIT
2015-16	Kamie Ethridge	13-16	8-10		
2016-17	Kamie Ethridge	22-8	14-4		
2017-18	Kamie Ethridge	26-7	15-3		NCAA Tournament First Round
Kamie Ethridge Win–loss Total:		88-44			
Jenny Huth (Big Sky) (2018–2021)
2018-19	Jenny Huth	21-11	3-13		WNIT
2019-20	Jenny Huth	13-18	8-12		
2020-21	Jenny Huth	14-12	12-7		
Jenny Huth Win–loss Total:		48-41			
Kristen Mattio (Big Sky) (2021–present)
2021–22	Kristen Mattio	3–22	2–13		
2022–23	Kristen Mattio	0–0	0–0		
Kristen Mattio Win–loss Total:		3–22 (.120)			
Total:		Win Loss Total			
National champion Postseason invitational champion Conference regular season champion Conference regular season and conference tournament champion Division regular season champion Division regular season and conference tournament champion Conference tournament champion

== Postseason ==
=== NCAA Division I tournament results ===
The Bears have appeared in the NCAA Division I Tournament once. Their combined record is 0–1.

Year	Seed	Round	Opponent	Result
2018	#10	First Round	#7 Michigan	L 61–75

=== NCAA Division II tournament results ===
The Bears made five appearances in the NCAA Division II women's basketball tournament. They had a combined record of 2–5.

Year	Round	Opponent	Result
1995	First Round	Minnesota–Duluth	L, 72–77
1996	First Round	Minnesota–Duluth	L, 60–65
1997	First Round	Nebraska–Kearney	L, 76–82 (OT)
1998	First Round; Second Round	Metro State; North Dakota	W, 74–64; L, 68–96
2000	First Round; Second Round	Nebraska–Kearney; North Dakota	W, 81–79; L, 67–82
