= 2026–27 Big West Conference women's basketball season =

- League: NCAA Division I
- Sport: Basketball
- Teams: 12
- TV partner(s): ESPN+, ESPNU

2026–27 NCAA Division I women's basketball season

Big West tournament
- Venue: Lee's Family Forum, Henderson, Nevada

Big West Conference women's basketball seasons
- ← 2025–26 2027–28 →

2026–27 Big West Conference women's basketball standings
	Conf.				Overall
Team	W		L	PCT	W		L	PCT
Cal State Bakersfield	0	–	0	–	0	–	0	–
California Baptist	0	–	0	–	0	–	0	–
Cal Poly	0	–	0	–	0	–	0	–
Cal State Fullerton	0	–	0	–	0	–	0	–
Cal State Northridge	0	–	0	–	0	–	0	–
Long Beach State	0	–	0	–	0	–	0	–
Sacramento State	0	–	0	–	0	–	0	–
UC Irvine	0	–	0	–	0	–	0	–
UC Riverside	0	–	0	–	0	–	0	–
UC San Diego	0	–	0	–	0	–	0	–
UC Santa Barbara	0	–	0	–	0	–	0	–
Utah Valley	0	–	0	–	0	–	0	–
† 2027 Big West tournament winner

The 2026–27 Big West Conference women's basketball season is for the Big West Conference in the 2026–27 NCAA Division I women's basketball season. The basketball teams begin with practices in October followed by the start of season in November 2026. Conference play begins in December 2025, and ends in March, after which the top 8 member teams participate in the 2027 Big West Conference women's basketball tournament at Lee's Family Forum in Henderson, Nevada. The tournament champion will receive the conference's automatic bid to the 2027 NCAA tournament.

The 2026–27 Big West Conference will compete as a 12-team league. Effective July 1, 2026, Hawaiʻi and UC Davis officially departed the conference to join the Mountain West Conference. To offset these departures, the Big West welcomed three new members: California Baptist and Utah Valley University from the Western Athletic Conference (WAC), as well as Sacramento State from the Big Sky Conference. This season is also the final year in the conference for UC San Diego and UC Santa Barbara, both of which accepted invitations to join the West Coast Conference (WCC) beginning in July 2027.

== Head coaches ==
=== Coaches ===
Team	Head coach	Previous job	Years at school	Overall record	Big West record	Big West titles	Big West tournament titles
Cal Poly	Shanele Stires	Cal State East Bay	5	45–76 (.372)	30–49 (.380)	0	0
Cal State Bakersfield	Ray Alvarado	Cal State Bakersfield (Interim)	1	0–0 (–)	0–0 (–)	0	0
Cal State Fullerton	Sammy Doucette	Vanguard	1	0–0 (–)	0–0 (–)	0	0
California Baptist	Jarrod Olson	Florida Southern	15	319–127 (.715)	0–0 (–)	0	0
CSUN	Angie Ned	California Baptist (Assistant)	3	14–45 (.237)	8–32 (.200)	0	0
Long Beach State	Minyon Moore	Ohio State (Assistant)	1	0–0 (–)	0–0 (–)	0	0
Sacramento State	Aaron Kallhoff	BYU (Assistant)	4	36–61 (.371)	0–0 (–)	0	0
UC Irvine	Tamara Inoue	New Mexico State (Assoc. HC)	11	187–123 (.603)	117–64 (.646)	2	1
UC Riverside	Brad Langston	UC Riverside (Assistant)	4	46–50 (.479)	33–27 (.550)	0	0
UC San Diego	Heidi VanDerveer	Occidental	15	276–139 (.665)	227–80 (.739)	1	2
UC Santa Barbara	Renee Jimenez	Cal State San Marcos	3	38–23 (.623)	24–16 (.600)	0	0
Utah Valley	Dan Nielson	BYU (Assistant)	8	92–109 (.458)	0–0 (–)	0	0

Notes:

- All records, appearances, titles, etc. are from time with current school only.
- Year at school includes 2026–27 season.
- Overall and Big West records are from time at current school only and are through the beginning of the season.

== Preseason ==
The Big West basketball season previews were held on October 1, 2026, but no preseason rankings were provided for the women's teams.

The Big West Conference released its preseason coaches' poll on October 15, 2026.

Place	Team	Points
1	UC San Diego	120 (10)
2	UC Irvine	108 (1)
3	UC Santa Barbara	94
4	California Baptist	93
5	Sacramento State	88 (1)
6	Utah Valley	70
7	UC Riverside	59
8	Cal State Northridge	53
9	Cal Poly	35
T10	Cal State Bakersfield	25
T10	Long Beach State	25
12	Cal State Fullerton	22
(#) first-place votes

=== Big West Preseason All-Big West Team ===
Player	School
Zoe Borter	UC Santa Barbara
Erin Condron	UC San Diego
Janessa Cotton	Sacramento State
Lev Feiman	UC San Diego
Lauren Olsen	California Baptist
Natalie Picton	Sacramento State
Rosa Smith	UC San Diego

== Regular season ==
=== Players of the Week ===
Throughout the conference regular season, the Big West will name one player of the week each Monday.

Date	Player of the Week	School

=== Early season tournaments ===
Team	Tournament	Finish
Cal State Fullerton	N/A	
California Baptist	CBU Thanksgiving Classic	
Cal Poly	N/A	
Cal State Bakersfield	ASU Thanksgiving Tournament	
Cal State Northridge	CBU Thanksgiving Classic	
Long Beach State	N/A	
Sacramento State	N/A	
UC Irvine	ZotGivingClassic	
UC Riverside	N/A	
UC San Diego	FDU Holiday Classic	
UC Santa Barbara	Portland Thanksgiving Series	
Utah Valley	N/A	

=== Records against other conferences ===
2026-27 records against non-conference opponents. Does not include exhibition matchups but includes postseason matchups.

Power 5 Conferences	Record
ACC	0–0
Big East	0–0
Big Ten	0–0
Big 12	0–0
SEC	0–0
Power 5 Total	0–0
Other NCAA Division I Conferences	Record
America East	0–0
American	0–0
A-10	0–0
ASUN	0–0
Big Sky	0–0
Big South	0–0
CAA	0–0
C-USA	0–0
Horizon League	0–0
Ivy League	0–0
MAAC	0–0
MAC	0–0
MEAC	0–0
MVC	0–0
Mountain West	0–0
NEC	0–0
OVC	0–0
Pac-12	0–0
Patriot League	0–0
SoCon	0–0
Southland	0–0
SWAC	0–0
Summit	0–0
Sun Belt	0–0
United Athletic Conference	0–0
WCC	0–0
Other Division I Total	0–0
NCAA Division I Total	0–0
NCAA Non Division I Total	0–0
Grand Total	0–0

== Postseason ==
=== Big West tournament ===
- The 2027 Big West Conference Basketball Tournament will be held at the Lee's Family Forum in Henderson, Nevada, in March 2027.

=== NCAA tournament ===
Seed	Region	School	First Four	First round	Second round	Sweet 16	Elite Eight	Final Four	Championship
		W–L (%):	0–0 (–)	0–0 (–)	0–0 (–)	0–0 (–)	0–0 (–)	0–0 (–)	0–0 (–)
Total: 0–0 (–)

=== National Invitation tournament ===
Seed	Bracket	School	1st round	2nd round	Quarterfinals	Semifinals	Championship
		W–L (%):	0–0 (–)	0–0 (–)	0–0 (–)	0–0 (–)	0–0 (–)
Total: 0–0 (–)

== Awards and honors ==
=== All-Big West Teams and Awards ===
==== Individual Awards ====
Honor	Recipient	School
Coach of the Year		
Player of the Year		
Newcomer of the Year		
Freshman of the Year		
Best Defensive Player		
Best Hustle Player		
Best Sixth Player		

==== All-Big West First Team ====
Player	Pos.	Yr.	Ht., Wt.	Hometown	School

==== All-Big West Second Team ====
Player	Pos.	Yr.	Ht., Wt.	Hometown	School

==== Honorable Mention ====
Player	Pos.	Yr.	Ht., Wt.	Hometown	School

== Home game attendance ==
Team	Arena	Capacity	Game 1	Game 2	Game 3	Game 4	Game 5	Game 6	Game 7	Game 8	Game 9	Game 10	Game 11	Game 12	Game 13	Game 14	Game 15	Game 16	Total	Average	% of Capacity
Cal State Fullerton	Titan Gym	4,000																			
California Baptist	CBU Events Center	5,050																			
Cal Poly	Mott Athletics Center	3,032																			
Cal State Bakersfield	Icardo Center	3,497																			
Cal State Northridge	Premier America Credit Union Arena	2,500																			
Long Beach State	Walter Pyramid	4,000																			
Sacramento State	Hornet Pavilion	3,000																			
UC Irvine	Bren Events Center	5,000																			
UC Riverside	SRC Arena	3,168																			
UC San Diego	LionTree Arena	4,000																			
UC Santa Barbara	The Thunderdome	5,000																			
Utah Valley	UCCU Center	8,500																			
Total		50,747																			

Bold – At or exceed capacity; attendance is for regular season only

- †Season high

== See also ==
- 2026–27 Big West Conference men's basketball season
