= 2026–27 UC Irvine Anteaters women's basketball team =

American college basketball season

2026–27 UC Irvine Anteaters women's basketball
- Conference: Big West Conference
- Record: 2–1 (0–0 Big West)
- Head coach: Tamara Inoue (11th season)
- Associate head coach: Cecilia Russell-Nava (11th season)
- Assistant coaches: Derek Wynn (5th season); Lauren Saiki (2nd season); Naomi Hunt (1st season); Zykera Rice (1st season)
- Home arena: Bren Events Center (Capacity: 5,000)

2026–27 Big West Conference women's basketball standings
| | Conf. | | | | Overall |
| Team | W | | L | PCT | W | | L | PCT |
|---|---|---|---|---|---|---|---|---|
| California Baptist | 0 | – | 0 | – | 4 | – | 0 | 1.000 |
| Sacramento State | 0 | – | 0 | – | 4 | – | 1 | .800 |
| UC Santa Barbara | 0 | – | 0 | – | 4 | – | 1 | .800 |
| Cal Poly | 0 | – | 0 | – | 3 | – | 1 | .750 |
| UC Irvine | 0 | – | 0 | – | 2 | – | 1 | .667 |
| Utah Valley | 0 | – | 0 | – | 2 | – | 1 | .667 |
| UC San Diego | 0 | – | 0 | – | 2 | – | 2 | .500 |
| Cal State Fullerton | 0 | – | 0 | – | 2 | – | 3 | .400 |
| Cal State Bakersfield | 0 | – | 0 | – | 1 | – | 2 | .333 |
| Cal State Northridge | 0 | – | 0 | – | 1 | – | 2 | .333 |
| UC Riverside | 0 | – | 0 | – | 1 | – | 4 | .200 |
| Long Beach State | 0 | – | 0 | – | 0 | – | 2 | .000 |
† 2027 Big West tournament winner As of November 19, 2026

The 2026–27 UC Irvine Anteaters women's basketball team will represent the University of California, Irvine in the 2026–27 NCAA Division I women's basketball season. They will play their home games at the Bren Events Center in Irvine, California as a member of the Big West Conference. The Anteaters will be led by 11th-year head coach Tamara Inoue.

== Previous season ==
The 2025–26 Anteaters team finished with a school record 26–7, including a 17–3 conference record. They were ousted in the Big West tournament semifinals by Hawai'i in overtime, losing 63–67. They received their first ever WBIT tournament, where they lost to San Diego State 55–61.

== Offseason ==
=== Preseason Polls ===
The Big West Coaches' Poll was released October 15, 2026. UC Irvine was predicted to finish second. This is the fourth consecutive year UC Irvine was predicted to finish as runner-up. No UC Irvine player was chosen for the preseason coaches' team.

Coaches' Poll
| Pos. | Team | Points |
|---|---|---|
| 1 | UC San Diego | 120 (10) |
| 2 | UC Irvine | 108 (1) |
| 3 | UC Santa Barbara | 94 |
| 4 | California Baptist | 93 |
| 5 | Sacramento State | 88 (1) |
| 6 | Utah Valley | 70 |
| 7 | UC Riverside | 59 |
| 8 | Cal State Northridge | 53 |
| 9 | Cal Poly | 35 |
| T-10 | Cal State Bakersfield | 25 |
| T-10 | Long Beach State | 25 |
| 12 | Cal State Fullerton | 22 |

== Roster ==
2026–27 UC Irvine Anteaters women's basketball team
Players
Coaches

| Pos. | # | Name | Height | Year | Previous school | Hometown |
|---|---|---|---|---|---|---|
| PG | 1 | Ameerah Grant | 5 ft 4 in (1.63 m) | So | Brown Deer High School | Brown Deer, WI |
| G | 2 | Ahrray Young | 5 ft 11 in (1.8 m) | Sr | Nevada | Sacramento, CA |
| G | 7 | Gracie Gallegos | 6 ft 1 in (1.85 m) | Sr | UC San Diego | Denver, CO |
| G | 8 | Sarah Miller | 5 ft 10 in (1.78 m) | Jr | Penn | Phoenix, AZ |
| F | 9 | Daniela Falcón Hernández | 6 ft 2 in (1.88 m) | Jr | Utah | Las Palmas, Spain |
| G | 10 | Lauryn Madsen | 5 ft 11 in (1.8 m) | Jr | Warden High School | Warden, WA |
| G | 11 | Haley Hernandez | 5 ft 11 in (1.8 m) | Sr | Archbishop Mitty High School | San Jose, CA |
| PG | 12 | Shirel Nahum | 5 ft 9 in (1.75 m) | Sr | Wingate Academy | Ra'anana, Israel |
| F | 13 | Nohe'alani Stores | 6 ft 2 in (1.88 m) | So | Mater Dei High School | East Palo Alto, CA |
| F | 14 | Summah Hanson | 6 ft 3 in (1.91 m) | Sr | Sacramento State | Brisbane, Australia |
| F | 15 | Alleah Hanson | 6 ft 2 in (1.88 m) | Fr | Brisbane State High School | Brisbane, Australia |
| G | 21 | Makiah Asidanya | 5 ft 7 in (1.7 m) | Sr | UNCG | Pittsburg, CA |
| G | 22 | Reese Noa | 5 ft 9 in (1.75 m) | Jr | North Torrance High School | Harbor City, CA |
| PG | 23 | Delaney White | 5 ft 7 in (1.7 m) | Fr | Sierra Canyon High School | Burbank, CA |
| G | 24 | Ellery Burke-Brown | 5 ft 9 in (1.75 m) | Fr | Roosevelt High School | Seattle, WA |

Head coach

- Tamara Inoue (Long Beach State)

Assistant coach(es)

- Cecilia Russell-Nava (New Mexico State)
- Derek Wynn (Cal State Fullerton)
- Lauren Saiki (UC Irvine)
- Naomi Hunt (Long Beach State)
- Zykera Rice (Gonzaga)

Legend

- (C) Team captain
- (S) Suspended
- (I) Ineligible
- (W) Walk-on
- Injured
- Current redshirt

Roster
Last update: October 20, 2026

== Schedule and results ==
| Date time, TV | Rank^{#} | Opponent^{#} | Result | Record | High points | High rebounds | High assists | Site (attendance) city, state |
Regular season
| November 5, 2026*; 7:00 pm, B1G+ | | at No. 11 UCLA | L 42–78 | 0–1 | 12 – White | 10 – Young | 4 – Madsen | Pauley Pavilion (2,548); Los Angeles, CA |
| November 10, 2026*; 5:00 pm | | at Northern Arizona | W 76–74 | 1–1 | 23 – Young | 11 – Gallegos | 4 – Nahum | Findlay Toyota Court (394); Flagstaff, AZ |
| November 16, 2026*; 2:00 pm | | at Eastern Washington | Canceled due to a citywide power outage. | | | | | Reese Court; Cheney, WA |
| November 18, 2026*; 6:00 pm, ESPN+ | | Idaho State | W 66–51 | 2–1 | 14 – White | 6 – Miller | 3 – Madsen | Bren Events Center (900); Irvine, CA |
| November 21, 2026*; 7:00 pm, ESPN+ | | at San Diego | | | | | | Jenny Craig Pavilion; San Diego, CA |
| November 27, 2026*; 2:00 pm, ESPN+ | | Jacksonville State; Zotgiving Classic | | | | | | Bren Events Center; Irvine, CA |
| November 28, 2026*; 4:30 pm, ESPN+ | | Utah State; Zotgiving Classic | | | | | | Bren Events Center; Irvine, CA |
| December 3, 2026; 6:00 pm, ESPN+ | | at UC Riverside; Big West Bold Week | | | | | | SRC Arena; Riverside, CA |
| December 5, 2026; 2:00 pm, ESPN+ | | at UC San Diego; Big West Bold Week | | | | | | LionTree Arena; La Jolla, CA |
| December 12, 2026*; 2:00 pm, ESPN+ | | UTEP | | | | | | Bren Events Center; Irvine, CA |
| December 14, 2026*; 6:00 pm | | New Mexico State | | | | | | CU Arena; Irvine, CA |
| December 18, 2026*; 6:00 pm, MW+ | | at New Mexico | | | | | | The Pit; Albuquerque, NM |
| December 31, 2027; 2:00 pm, ESPN+ | | Long Beach State; Black and Blue Rivalry | | | | | | Bren Events Center; Irvine, CA |
| January 2, 2027; 2:00 pm, ESPN+ | | Cal State Fullerton | | | | | | Bren Events Center; Irvine, CA |
| January 7, 2027; 2:00 pm, ESPN+ | | at Sacramento State | | | | | | Hornet Pavilion; Sacramento, CA |
| January 9, 2027; 1:00 pm, ESPN+ | | at Utah Valley | | | | | | UCCU Center; Orem, UT |
| January 14, 2027; 6:00 pm, ESPN+ | | California Baptist | | | | | | Bren Events Center; Irvine, CA |
| January 16, 2027; 2:00 pm, ESPN+ | | UC Riverside | | | | | | Bren Events Center; Irvine, CA |
| January 21, 2027; 7:00 pm, ESPN+ | | at Cal State Fullerton | | | | | | Titan Gym; Fullerton, CA |
| January 23, 2027; 2:00 pm, ESPN+ | | at Long Beach State; Black and Blue Rivalry | | | | | | Walter Pyramid; Long Beach, CA |
| January 28, 2027; 6:00 pm, ESPN+ | | Cal Poly | | | | | | Bren Events Center; Irvine, CA |
| January 30, 2027; 1:00 pm, ESPN+/SSN | | UC Santa Barbara | | | | | | Bren Events Center; Irvine, CA |
| February 4, 2027; 6:30 pm, ESPN+ | | at Cal State Bakersfield | | | | | | Icardo Center; Bakersfield, CA |
| February 6, 2027; 2:00 pm, ESPN+ | | at Cal State Northridge | | | | | | Premier America Credit Union Arena; Northridge, CA |
| February 11, 2027; 6:00 pm, ESPN+ | | Utah Valley | | | | | | Bren Events Center; Irvine, CA |
| February 13, 2027; 2:00 pm, ESPN+ | | Sacramento State | | | | | | Bren Events Center; Irvine, CA |
| February 18, 2027; 6:00 pm, ESPN+ | | at California Baptist | | | | | | Fowler Events Center; Riverside, CA |
| February 20, 2027; 1:00 pm, ESPN+/SSN | | UC San Diego | | | | | | Bren Events Center; Irvine, CA |
| February 25, 2027; 6:00 pm, ESPN+ | | UC Santa Barbara | | | | | | The Thunderdome; Santa Barbara, CA |
| February 27, 2027; 2:00 pm, ESPN+ | | Cal Poly | | | | | | Mott Athletics Center; San Luis Obispo, CA |
| March 4, 2027; 6:00 pm, ESPN+ | | Cal State Northridge | | | | | | Bren Events Center; Irvine, CA |
| March 6, 2027; 2:00 pm, ESPN+ | | Cal State Bakersfield | | | | | | Bren Events Center; Irvine, CA |
Big West tournament
| March 10–13, 2027; TBA, ESPN+ | | vs. TBD | | | | | | Lee's Family Forum; Henderson, NV |
*Non-conference game. ^{#}Rankings from AP Poll. (#) Tournament seedings in parentheses. All times are in Pacific.

== Rankings ==
Ranking movements Legend: — = Not ranked
| | Week | | | | | | | | | | | | | | | | | | | | |
| Poll | Pre | 1 | 2 | 3 | 4 | 5 | 6 | 7 | 8 | 9 | 10 | 11 | 12 | 13 | 14 | 15 | 16 | 17 | 18 | 19 | Final |
|---|---|---|---|---|---|---|---|---|---|---|---|---|---|---|---|---|---|---|---|---|---|
| AP | — | | | | | | | | | | | | | | | | | | | | |
| Coaches | — | | | | | | | | | | | | | | | | | | | | |

== See Also ==
- 2026–27 UC Irvine Anteaters men's basketball team
