= 2026–27 Utah Valley Wolverines women's basketball team =

Intercollegiate basketball season

2026–27 Utah Valley Wolverines women's basketball
- Conference: Big West Conference
- Record: 2–2 (0–0 WAC)
- Head coach: Dan Nielson (8th season)
- Assistant coaches: McKenzie Lai (3rd season); Danja Collins (1st season); Keith Lai (1st season) Kylee Mabry (1st season)
- Home arena: UCCU Center (Capacity: 8,500); Lockhart Arena (Capacity: 2,000)

2026–27 Big West Conference women's basketball standings
	Conf.				Overall
Team	W		L	PCT	W		L	PCT
California Baptist	0	–	0	–	4	–	0	1.000
Sacramento State	0	–	0	–	4	–	1	.800
UC Santa Barbara	0	–	0	–	4	–	1	.800
Cal Poly	0	–	0	–	3	–	2	.600
UC Irvine	0	–	0	–	2	–	1	.667
Utah Valley	0	–	0	–	2	–	1	.667
Cal State Fullerton	0	–	0	–	3	–	3	.500
Cal State Northridge	0	–	0	–	2	–	2	.500
UC San Diego	0	–	0	–	2	–	2	.500
Cal State Bakersfield	0	–	0	–	1	–	2	.333
UC Riverside	0	–	0	–	1	–	4	.200
Long Beach State	0	–	0	–	0	–	3	.000
† 2027 Big West tournament winner As of November 21, 2026

The 2026–27 Utah Valley Wolverines women's basketball team represents Utah Valley University in the 2026–27 NCAA Division I women's basketball season. Dan Nielson entered the season as head coach for his eighth season. The Wolverines play their home games at the UCCU Center and Lockhart Arena in Orem, Utah as members of the Big West Conference.

This will be the Wolverines' first season in the Big West. In March 2025, the Big West Conference reportedly invited Utah Valley to join their conference beginning in 2026. UVU's Big West move was officially announced on June 4, 2025. California Baptist also joins the Big West Conference from the WAC while Sacramento State joins from the Big Sky Conference. For the 2026–27 season, the Big West competes with 12 members as UC Davis and Hawaii depart for the Mountain West Conference in 2026 while UC San Diego and UC Santa Barbara depart for the West Coast Conference in 2027.

== Previous season ==
The Wolverines finished the 2025–26 season 16–15, 9–9 in WAC play, to finish in fourth place in the Western Athletic Conference. As the No. 4 seed in the WAC tournament, they lost to Tarleton in the quarterfinals 57–60. Utah Valley was invited to participate in the 2026 Women's National Invitation Tournament. The Wolverines were defeated in the first round by San Francisco 50–80.

== Offseason ==
=== Departures ===
Name	Position	Height	Year	Reason for departure†
Kylee Mabry	G	5' 11"	Senior	Graduated
Amanda Barcello	G/F	5' 11"	Senior	Graduated
Saige Gibb	G	5' 10"	Senior	Graduated
Kaylee Headrick	F	5' 10"	Senior	Graduated
Halle Nelson	G/F	6' 1"	Senior	Graduated
Tessa Chaney	C	6' 3"	Senior	Graduated
Gracie Sorenson	C	6' 4"	Senior	Graduated
KJ Carlyle	G	6' 2"	Sophomore	Entered transfer portal
Gaby Goo	F	6' 0"	Sophomore	Entered transfer portal

=== Incoming transfers ===
Name	Position	Height	Year	Previous school
Heather Stedman	G	6' 0"	Sophomore	Cal State Northridge
Elizabeth Gentry	C	6' 3"	Junior	Creighton
Lauren Johnson (Crocker)	F	6' 4"	Senior	Utah Tech
Gracie Johnson	F	6' 6"	Junior	Utah State
Maren McKenna	G	5' 9"	Sophomore	Wyoming

=== Incoming freshman ===
Name	Position	Height	High school	Hometown
Olivia Stephens	G	5' 8"	Brighton	Sandy, UT
Gabi Moultry	G	5' 8"	Wilsonville	Wilsonville, OR
Tabi Clark	G/F	6' 2"	Pleasant Grove	Pleasant Grove, UT

== Roster ==
2026–27 Utah Valley Wolverines women's basketball team
Players
Coaches

Pos.	#	Name	Height	Year	Previous school	Hometown
G	0	Olivia Stephens	5 ft 8 in (1.73 m)	Fr	Alta High School	Draper, UT
G	2	Anna Shreeve	5 ft 8 in (1.73 m)	So	San Juan Hills High School	Ladera Ranch, CA
G	5	Cambree Blackham	5 ft 7 in (1.7 m)	Jr	Skyridge High School	Lehi, UT
G	6	Heather Stedman	6 ft 0 in (1.83 m)	RS Fr	Pinnacle High School; Cal State Northridge	Phoenix, AZ
F	7	Kendra Kitchen	6 ft 1 in (1.85 m)	RS Fr	Davis High School	Fruit Heights, UT
G/F	8	Tabi Clark	6 ft 2 in (1.88 m)	Fr	Pleasant Grove High School	Lindon, UT
G	12	Maren McKenna	5 ft 9 in (1.75 m)	So	Green Canyon High School; Wyoming	Hyde Park, UT
F	15	Evie Leeson	6 ft 2 in (1.88 m)	RS So	St Margaret's College; Alaska Anchorage	Christchurch, New Zealand
F	20	Gracie Johnson	6 ft 6 in (1.98 m)	Jr	Nyssa High School; Utah State	Nyssa, OR
G	21	Naia Tanuvasa	5 ft 10 in (1.78 m)	Jr	Lone Peak High School; BYU	Highland, UT
F	24	Lauren Johnson	6 ft 4 in (1.93 m)	Sr	Perry High School; Utah State; Utah Tech	Gilbert, AZ
C	30	Elizabeth Gentry	6 ft 3 in (1.91 m)	RS Jr	Arapahoe High School Creighton	Littleton, CO
G	31	Gabi Moultry	5 ft 8 in (1.73 m)	Fr	Wilsonville High School	Wilsonville, OR

Head coach

- Dan Nielson (BYU)

Assistant coach(es)

- McKenzie Lai (Hawaiʻi–Hilo)
- Danja Collins (Santa Clara)
- Keith Lai (Cal Baptist)
- Kylee Mabry (Utah Valley)

Strength and conditioning coach(es)

- Josh Morzelewski (Utah)

Athletic trainer(s)

- Aaron Leavitt

Legend

- (C) Team captain
- (S) Suspended
- (I) Ineligible
- (W) Walk-on
- Injured
- Current redshirt

Roster
Last update: July 28, 2026

== Schedule and results ==
Date time, TV	Rank^{#}	Opponent^{#}	Result	Record	High points	High rebounds	High assists	Site (attendance) city, state
Regular season
November 3, 2026*; 6:00pm, ESPN+		Park University (Gilbert, AZ)	W 85–32	1–0	14 – Gentry	12 – G. Johnson	7 – Blackham	UCCU Center (598); Orem, UT
November 7, 2026*; 4:00pm, ESPN+		Santa Clara	L 62–64	1–1	18 – Gentry	8 – Gentry	7 – Blackham	UCCU Center (653); Orem, UT
November 14, 2026*; 2:00pm, ESPN+		Nevada	W 60–48	2–1	17 – Stephens	13 – L. Johnson	4 – Tanuvasa	UCCU Center (632); Orem, UT
November 20, 2026*; 7:00pm, ESPN+		at Utah	L 66–92	2–2	15 – Blackham	7 – Gentry	4 – Blackham	Jon M. Huntsman Center (1,710); Salt Lake City, UT
November 24, 2026*; 6:00pm, ESPN+		BYU; Crosstown Clash						UCCU Center; Orem, UT
November 28, 2026*; 5:00pm, ESPN+		at Idaho State						Reed Gym; Pocatello, ID
December 3, 2026; 6:00pm, ESPN+		Long Beach State						UCCU Center; Orem, UT
December 5, 2026; 12:00pm, ESPN+		at Sacramento State						Hornets Nest; Sacramento, CA
December 9, 2026*; 6:00pm, ESPN+		Utah State						UCCU Center; Orem, UT
December 12, 2026*; TBA		at Pepperdine						Firestone Fieldhouse; Malibu, CA
December 17, 2026*; 6:00pm, ESPN+		UC Davis						UCCU Center; Orem, UT
December 19, 2026*; 12:00pm, ESPN+		Western Colorado						Lockhart Arena; Orem, UT
December 31, 2026; 7:30pm, ESPN+		at Cal State Bakersfield						Icardo Center; Bakersfield, CA
January 2, 2027; 3:00pm, ESPN+		at Cal State Northridge						Premier America Credit Union Arena; Northridge, CA
January 7, 2027; 6:00pm, ESPN+		UC San Diego						UCCU Center; Orem, UT
January 9, 2027; 2:00pm, ESPN+		UC Irvine						UCCU Center; Orem, UT
January 14, 2027; 7:00pm, ESPN+		at UC Santa Barbara						The Thunderdome; Santa Barbara, CA
January 16, 2027; 3:00pm, ESPN+		at Cal Poly						Mott Athletics Center; San Luis Obispo, CA
January 21, 2027; 7:00pm, ESPN+		at California Baptist						Fowler Events Center; Riverside, CA
January 23, 2027; 3:00pm, ESPN+		at UC Riverside						SRC Arena; Riverside, CA
January 28, 2027; 6:00pm, ESPN+		Cal State Northridge						Lockhart Arena; Orem, UT
January 30, 2027; 2:00pm, ESPN+		Cal State Bakersfield						Lockhart Arena; Orem, UT
February 4, 2027; 5:00pm, ESPN+		UC Riverside						UCCU Center; Orem, UT
February 6, 2027; 2:00pm, ESPN+		California Baptist						UCCU Center; Orem, UT
February 11, 2027; 7:00pm, ESPN+		at UC Irvine						Bren Events Center; Irvine, CA
February 13, 2027; 5:00pm, ESPN+		at UC San Diego						LionTree Arena; San Diego, CA
February 18, 2027; 6:00pm, ESPN+		Cal State Fullerton						Lockhart Arena; Orem, UT
February 20, 2027; 2:00pm, ESPN+		Sacramento State						Lockhart Arena; Orem, UT
February 25, 2027; 7:00pm, ESPN+		at Long Beach State						LBS Financial Credit Union Pyramid; Long Beach, CA
February 27, 2027; 3:00pm, ESPN+		at Cal State Fullerton						Titan Gym; Fullerton, CA
March 4, 2027; 6:00pm, ESPN+		Cal Poly						UCCU Center; Orem, UT
March 6, 2027; 2:00pm, ESPN+		UC Santa Barbara						UCCU Center; Orem, UT
Big West tournament
March 2027; TBA, ESPN+		vs. TBD						Lee's Family Forum; Henderson, NV
*Non-conference game. ^{#}Rankings from AP poll. (#) Tournament seedings in parentheses. All times are in Mountain.

== See also ==
- 2026–27 Utah Valley Wolverines men's basketball team
