= 2026–27 Sacramento State Hornets women's basketball team =

American college basketball season

2026–27 Sacramento State Hornets women's basketball
- Conference: Big Sky Conference
- Record: 3–0 (0–0 Big Sky)
- Head coach: Aaron Kallhoff (4th season)
- Associate head coach: De'Audra Brown; Michael Floyd
- Assistant coaches: Jodi Page; Austin Ritter
- Home arena: Hornet Pavilion

2026–27 Big West Conference women's basketball standings
	Conf.				Overall
Team	W		L	PCT	W		L	PCT
UC Santa Barbara	0	–	0	–	3	–	0	1.000
California Baptist	0	–	0	–	2	–	0	1.000
Sacramento State	0	–	0	–	3	–	1	.750
Cal Poly	0	–	0	–	3	–	1	.750
UC San Diego	0	–	0	–	2	–	1	.667
Cal State Fullerton	0	–	0	–	2	–	2	.500
Cal State Bakersfield	0	–	0	–	1	–	1	.500
Cal State Northridge	0	–	0	–	1	–	1	.500
UC Irvine	0	–	0	–	1	–	1	.500
Utah Valley	0	–	0	–	1	–	1	.500
UC Riverside	0	–	0	–	1	–	2	.333
Long Beach State	0	–	0	–	0	–	2	.000
† 2027 Big West tournament winner As of November 14, 2026

The 2026–27 Sacramento State Hornets women's basketball team represent California State University, Sacramento during the 2026-27 NCAA Division I women's basketball season. The Hornets, is led by fourth-year head coach Aaron Kallhoff, they play their home games at the newly opened Hornet Pavilion in Sacramento, California as a member on the Big West Conference (BWC).

This is Sacramento State's first season as a member of the Big West Conference (BWC) after playing in the Big Sky Conference for 30 years (1996-2026).

== Previous season ==
The Hornets finished the 2025-26 season 14–17, 8–10 in Big Sky play, good for fifth place. As the fifth seed in the Big Sky Tournament, they defeated fourth seed Idaho State 66–52 in the Quarterfinals, but lost to top seed Idaho 59–51 in the Semifinals.

== Roster ==
2025–26 Sacramento State Hornets women's basketball team
Players	Coaches
Pos. / # / Name / Height / Year / Previous school / Hometown	Head coach: Aaron Kallhoff (Bemidji State); Assistant coach(es): De'Audra Brown (Elizabeth City State); Michael Floyd (Murray State); Jodi Page (Central Queensland); Austin Ritter (Sacramento State); Legend: (C) Team captain; (S) Suspended; (I) Ineligible; (W) Walk-on; Injured; Current redshirt; Roster; Last update: January 30, 2026

== Schedule and results ==
Date time, TV	Rank^{#}	Opponent^{#}	Result	Record	High points	High rebounds	High assists	Site (attendance) city, state
Exhibition
Regular season
Big West tournament
*Non-conference game. ^{#}Rankings from AP Poll. (#) Tournament seedings in parentheses. All times are in Pacific.
