= Bill Walton Classic =

College basketball game

- Sport: College basketball
- Founded: 2026
- No. of teams: 4 (2 per gender)
- Venue: Pechanga Arena
- Sponsor: National University

The Bill Walton Classic, officially the National University Bill Walton Classic, is an annual series of college basketball games played in San Diego, California. Created in 2026, it consists of a single game each for men's and women's teams.

The doubleheader was created as a tribute to Naismith Basketball Hall of Fame inductee and San Diego native Bill Walton. The first Classic featured the three NCAA Division I schools in the San Diego area.

== History ==
On April 22, 2026, the Bill Walton Classic was unveiled by Sports San Diego and the Bill Walton Foundation. Walton, who died in May 2024, is regarded as a San Diego sports legend. The announcement took place at Helix High School, where he graduated in 1970. Sports San Diego CEO Mark Neville hoped to go "all-in on the Bill Walton stuff", such as tie-dye apparel in reference to Walton being a fan of the Grateful Dead.

The Pechanga Arena was selected as the host venue because Walton played there as a member of the San Diego Clippers. National University is the title sponsor.

The inaugural edition will be held on November 7, 2026. The women's game is to be played between San Diego and UC San Diego, while the men's matchup pits San Diego State against Colorado. Three of the four teams are from the San Diego area, while Walton frequently called Colorado games as an announcer and was fond of the city of Boulder. TCU was originally slated to play SDSU but objected to the game's location making it a de facto San Diego State home game.

== Results ==
Bill Walton Classic (men's)
| Date | Winner | Score | Opponent | Attendance | Venue | Source |
|---|---|---|---|---|---|---|
| November 7, 2026 | San Diego State | 77–66 | Colorado | 3,432 | Pechanga Arena | |

Bill Walton Classic (women's)
| Date | Winner | Score | Opponent | Attendance | Venue | Source |
|---|---|---|---|---|---|---|
| November 7, 2026 | UC San Diego | 90–88 (OT) | San Diego | 3,432 | Pechanga Arena | |

== See also ==
- Rady Children's Invitational, college basketball tournament in San Diego also organized by Sports San Diego
