= 2026–27 UC San Diego Tritons women's basketball team =

American college basketball season

2026–27 UC San Diego Tritons women's basketball
- Conference: Big West Conference
- Record: 2–1 (0–0 Big West)
- Head coach: Heidi VanDerveer (15th season)
- Associate head coach: Vanessa Nygaard
- Assistant coaches: PhyNique Allen; Alexandria Young; Miranda Seto
- Home arena: LionTree Arena

2026–27 Big West Conference women's basketball standings
	Conf.				Overall
Team	W		L	PCT	W		L	PCT
California Baptist	0	–	0	–	3	–	0	1.000
UC Santa Barbara	0	–	0	–	3	–	0	1.000
Sacramento State	0	–	0	–	3	–	1	.750
Cal Poly	0	–	0	–	3	–	1	.750
UC San Diego	0	–	0	–	2	–	1	.667
Cal State Fullerton	0	–	0	–	2	–	2	.500
Cal State Bakersfield	0	–	0	–	1	–	1	.500
Cal State Northridge	0	–	0	–	1	–	1	.500
UC Irvine	0	–	0	–	1	–	1	.500
Utah Valley	0	–	0	–	1	–	1	.500
UC Riverside	0	–	0	–	1	–	2	.333
Long Beach State	0	–	0	–	0	–	2	.000
† 2027 Big West tournament winner As of November 15, 2026

The 2026–27 UC San Diego Tritons women's basketball team will represent the University of California, San Diego during the 2026–27 NCAA Division I women's basketball season. The Tritons, led by 14th-year head coach Heidi VanDerveer, played their home games at LionTree Arena in La Jolla, California as members of the Big West Conference.

This is the third year the team is eligible for the NCAA tournament.This will also be the program's final season as full members of the Big West Conference before transitioning to the West Coast Conference.

== Previous season ==
The Tritons finished the 2025–26 season 24–9, 17–3 in Big West play, to finish in a tie for first place. They received the 2 seed in the Big West tournament, where they won over UC Davis in the semifinals and Hawaii in the championship game to win the Big West championship and clinch the automatic bid to the NCAA tournament. It marked UC San Diego's second consecutive NCAA D-I tournament appearance. They were seeded as the No.14 seed in the Sacramento 4 region, where they fell to No. 14 TCU in the First Round.

== Offseason ==
=== Departures ===
Departures
Name	Number	Pos.	Height	Year	Hometown	Reason for departure
Makayla Rose	4	G	5' 7"	Senior	Roseville, CA	Graduated
Gabby Louther	5	G	5' 11"	Senior	Pueblo West, CO	Transferred to CSU Pueblo
Sabrina Ma	15	G	5' 10"	Senior	San Francisco, CA	Graduated
Nicki Polocheck	21	G/F	6' 0"	Sophomore	Houston, TX	Not on team roster
Gracie Gallegos	22	G	6' 1"	RS Junior	Denver, CO	Transferred to UC Irvine
Niya Price	22	G/F	6' 0"	Freshman	Lancaster, CA	Transferred to Cal State Los Angeles
Junae Mahan	25	G	5' 8"	RS Junior	Stockton, CA	Graduated
Damilola Sule	20	F	6' 0"	Graduate Student	Bakersfield, CA	Graduated

=== Incoming Transfers ===
Incoming transfers
Name	Number	Pos.	Height	Year	Hometown	Previous school
Jite Gbemuotor	0	F	6' 2"	Junior	Delta State, Nigeria	Cal State Northridge
Coryn Watts	5	G	5' 7"	Junior	Aurora, CO	Denver
Alexandra Cummins	22	G	5' 9"	Senior	Moraga, CA	San Jose State

== Preseason ==
The Big West Conference released its preseason coaches' poll on October 15, 2026.

Place	Team	Points
1	UC San Diego	120 (10)
2	UC Irvine	108 (1)
3	UC Santa Barbara	94
4	California Baptist	93
5	Sacramento State	88 (1)
6	Utah Valley	70
7	UC Riverside	59
8	Cal State Northridge	53
9	Cal Poly	35
T10	Cal State Bakersfield	25
T10	Long Beach State	25
12	Cal State Fullerton	22
(#) first-place votes

=== Big West Preseason All-Big West Team ===
Player	School
Zoe Borter	UC Santa Barbara
Erin Condron	UC San Diego
Janessa Cotton	Sacramento State
Lev Feiman	UC San Diego
Lauren Olsen	California Baptist
Natalie Picton	Sacramento State
Rosa Smith	UC San Diego

== Roster ==
2025–26 UC San Diego Tritons women's basketball team
Players
Coaches

Pos.	#	Name	Height	Year	Previous school	Hometown
F	0	Jite Gbemuotor	6 ft 2 in (1.88 m)	Jr	Cal State Northridge	Delta State, Nigeria
G	2	Michaela Fairwell	5 ft 11 in (1.8 m)	So	Dutch Fork High School	Irmo, SC
F	3	Tatum Jones	6 ft 2 in (1.88 m)	So	Mullen High School	Aurora, CO
G	5	Coryn Watts	5 ft 7 in (1.7 m)	Jr	Denver	Aurora, CO
G	7	Emma Cook	5 ft 10 in (1.78 m)	Fr	Archbishop Mitty High School	San Jose, CA
F	8	Noelle Mulvanny	6 ft 0 in (1.83 m)	Fr	Mater Dei High School	Santa Ana, CA
G	10	Dymonique Maxie	5 ft 8 in (1.73 m)	Sr	Nevada	Hayward, CA
F/C	11	Erin Condron	6 ft 4 in (1.93 m)	Sr	Braemar College	Woodend, Australia
G	12	Rosa Smith	5 ft 7 in (1.7 m)	GS	Idaho	Kirkland, WA
G	13	Lev Feiman	5 ft 9 in (1.75 m)	So	Brentwood School	Woodland Hills, CA
G	20	Sadie Sin	5 ft 4 in (1.63 m)	Fr	Clovis High School	Clovis, CA
G	21	Megan Roberts	5 ft 7 in (1.7 m)	Fr	Eastlake High School	Sammamish, WA
G	22	Alexandra Cummins	5 ft 9 in (1.75 m)	Sr	San Jose State	Moraga, CA

Head coach

- Heidi VanDerveer (College of Charleston)

Assistant coach(es)

- Vanessa Nygaard (Stanford)
- PhyNique Allen (Cal State Bakersfield)
- Alexandria Young (San Diego)
- Miranda Seto (UC San Diego)

Legend

- (C) Team captain
- (S) Suspended
- (I) Ineligible
- (W) Walk-on
- Injured
- Current redshirt

Roster
Last update: November 2, 2026

== Schedule and results ==
Date time, TV	Rank^{#}	Opponent^{#}	Result	Record	High points	High rebounds	High assists	Site (attendance) city, state
Regular season
November 2, 2026*; 11:00 a.m., B1G+		at No. 16 Washington	L 63–79	0–1	15 – Watts	6 – Condron	3 – Maxie	Alaska Airlines Arena (1,372); Seattle, WA
November 7, 2026*; 3:00 p.m.		vs. San Diego; Bill Walton Classic	W 90–88 ^{OT}	1–1	21 – Feiman	8 – Condron	4 – Tied	Pechanga Arena (3,432); San Diego, CA
November 12, 2026*; 11:00 a.m., ESPN+		Portland State	W 78–64	2–1	17 – Feiman	5 – Fairwell	4 – Sin	Liontree Arena (4,000); La Jolla, CA
November 15, 2026*; 1:00 p.m., ESPN+		San Francisco						Liontree Arena; La Jolla, CA
November 24, 2026*; 6:00 p.m., ESPN+		Whittier College						Liontree Arena; La Jolla, CA
*Non-conference game. ^{#}Rankings from AP poll. (#) Tournament seedings in parentheses. All times are in Pacific.
