= 2026–27 San Jose State Spartans women's basketball team =

American collegiate basketball season

2026–27 San Jose State Spartans women's basketball
- Conference: Mountain West Conference
- Record: 0–2 (0–0 MW)
- Head coach: Jonas Chatterton (2nd season)
- Assistant coaches: Emily Codding; Brandon Morrison; Jordan Loera; Jordan Moser
- Home arena: Provident Credit Union Event Center

2026–27 Mountain West Conference women's basketball standings
	Conf.				Overall
Team	W		L	PCT	W		L	PCT
Air Force	0	–	0	–	2	–	0	1.000
Grand Canyon	0	–	0	–	2	–	0	1.000
UTEP	0	–	0	–	2	–	1	.667
New Mexico	0	–	0	–	1	–	1	.500
Nevada	0	–	0	–	1	–	2	.333
UC Davis	0	–	0	–	1	–	2	.333
UNLV	0	–	0	–	1	–	2	.333
Wyoming	0	–	0	–	1	–	2	.333
San Jose State	0	–	0	–	0	–	2	.000
Hawai'i	0	–	0	–	0	–	2	.000
† 2027 Mountain West tournament winner As of November 11, 2026

The 2026–27 San Jose State Spartans women's basketball team represents San Jose State University during the 2026–27 NCAA Division I women's basketball season. The Spartans, led by second-year head coach Jonas Chatterton, play their home games at the Provident Credit Union Event Center in San Jose, California, as members of the Mountain West Conference.

== Previous season ==
The Spartans finished the 2025–26 season 4–28, 2–16 in Mountain West play, to finish in a tie for eleventh (last) place. As an No. 12 seed in the Mountain West tournament they lost in the first round to Boise State.

== Offseason ==
=== Departures ===
San Jose State departures
Name	Num	Pos.	Height	Year	Hometown	Reason for departure
Katarina Anderson	0	G	5'7"	Senior	Nipomo, CA	Graduated
Allie Cummins	1	G	5'9"	Junior	Moraga, CA	Transferred to Cal Poly
McKenna Simons	2	G	5'10"	Senior	Overland Park, KS	Graduated
Mecca Alexander	3	G	5'7"	Sophomore	Antioch, CA	Transferred to UC San Diego
Harisa Mehmedovic	5	F	6'1"	Junior	Salt Lake City, UT	Transferred to UC Riverside
Amira Brown	8	G	5'10"	(redshirt) Senior	Richmond, CA	Graduated
Maya Anderson	15	G/F	6'1"	(redshirt) Sophomore	Toronto, ON	Transferred to Ole Miss
Briannah McGee	20	G	5'7"	Junior	Murrieta, CA	Left the team
Kaliyah Dillard	22	F	6'0"	(redshirt) Sophomore	Las Vegas, NV	Transferred to DePaul
Stella Sgro	23	G	5'11"	Sophomore	Toronto, ON	Transferred to Wagner

=== Incoming transfers ===
San Jose State incoming transfers
Name	Num	Pos.	Height	Year	Hometown	Previous school
Kayla Lorenz	2	G	6'1"	Junior	Seattle, WA	UT Rio Grande Valley
Natalija Grizelj	3	G	5'9"	Graduate Student	Sunnyvale, CA	San Diego State
Maleyni Tolliver	5	F	6'3"	Junior	Palmdale, CA	Moorpark College
Tamar Bargal	6	F	6'1"	Senior	Ramla, Israel	Elitzur Ramla
Cristina Sánchez Cerqueira	7	F	6'1"	Senior	Granada, Spain	Arkansas
Isa Hämäläinen	20	G	6'1"	Sophomore	Lorentzweiler, Luxembourg	Colorado
Sydnie Rodriguez	22	G	6'0"	Junior	Boise, ID	Seattle

==== Recruiting ====
College recruiting (2027)
Name	Hometown	School	Height	Weight	Commit date
Erika Mace; G	Espoo, Finland		5 ft 9 in (1.75 m)	N/A	
Erika Mace; G	Recruit ratings: No ratings found				
Alyssa Rudd; G	Alamo, California	San Ramon Valley High School	5 ft 8 in (1.73 m)	N/A	
Alyssa Rudd; G	Recruit ratings: No ratings found				
Eve Blagrove; G	Barendrecht, Netherlands		6 ft 0 in (1.83 m)	N/A	
Eve Blagrove; G	Recruit ratings: No ratings found				
Overall recruit ranking:
Note: In many cases, Scout, Rivals, 247Sports, On3, and ESPN may conflict in their listings of height and weight.; In these cases, the average was taken. ESPN grades are on a 100-point scale.; Sources: "2027 Player Commits". ESPN. Archived from the original on August 12, 2025.

== Roster ==
2026–27 San Jose State Spartans women's basketball team
Players
Coaches

Pos.	#	Name	Height	Year	Previous school	Hometown
G	2	Kayla Lorenz	6 ft 1 in (1.85 m)	Jr	UT Rio Grande Valley	Seattle, Washington
G	3	Natalija Grizelj	5 ft 9 in (1.75 m)	GS	San Diego State	Sunnyvale, California
G	4	Rylei Waugh	5 ft 6 in (1.68 m)	RS Jr	Pima Community College	Los Angeles, California
F	5	Maleyni Tolliver	6 ft 3 in (1.91 m)	Jr	Moorpark College	Palmdale, California
F	6	Tamar Bargal	6 ft 1 in (1.85 m)	Sr	Elitzur Ramla	Ramla, Israel
F	7	Cristina Sánchez Cerqueira	6 ft 1 in (1.85 m)	Sr	Arkansas	Granada, Spain
G/F	10	Amelie Sitterud	6 ft 0 in (1.83 m)	Sr	Loyola Marymount	Kirkland, Washington
G	11	Carla Fuster	5 ft 10 in (1.78 m)	So	INS Alba del Vallès	Barcelona, Spain
G	17	Erika Mace	5 ft 9 in (1.75 m)	Fr		Espoo, Finland
G	20	Isa Hämäläinen	6 ft 1 in (1.85 m)	So	Colorado	Lorentzweiler, Luxembourg
G	21	Alyssa Rudd	5 ft 8 in (1.73 m)	Fr	San Ramon Valley High School	Alamo, California
G	22	Sydnie Rodriguez	6 ft 0 in (1.83 m)	Jr	Seattle	Boise, Idaho
F	32	Gabriela Pato	6 ft 4 in (1.93 m)	So	Escola Rosalína De Castro	Vigo, Spain
G	77	Eve Blagrove	6 ft 0 in (1.83 m)	Fr		Barendrecht, Netherlands

Head coach

- Jonas Chatterton (Utah)

Assistant coach(es)

- Emily Codding (Oregon State)
- Brandon Morrison (UNLV)
- Jordan Loera (Oregon)
- Jordan Moser (Oklahoma)

Legend

- (C) Team captain
- (S) Suspended
- (I) Ineligible
- (W) Walk-on
- Injured
- Current redshirt

Roster

== Schedule and results ==
Date time, TV	Rank^{#}	Opponent^{#}	Result	Record	High points	High rebounds	High assists	Site (attendance) city, state
Exhibition
October 28, 2026*; 7:00 p.m.		Cal State East Bay	W 91–84		21 – Tied	11 – Brown	4 – Tied	Provident Credit Union Event Center (344); San Jose, CA
Non-conference regular season
November 2, 2026*; 10:00 a.m., B1G+		at Nebraska	L 54–81	0–1	20 – Mace	8 – Sánchez Cerqueira	3 – Mace	Pinnacle Bank Arena (8,272); Lincoln, NE
November 10, 2026*; 4:00 p.m., SECN+		at No. 14 Oklahoma	L 44–98	0–2	11 – Blacklock	6 – Tied	2 – Mace	Lloyd Noble Center (3,227); Norman, OK
November 15, 2026*; 1:00 p.m., MW+		Portland State						Provident Credit Union Event Center; San Jose, CA
November 18, 2026*; 11:00 a.m., MW+		California Baptist						Provident Credit Union Event Center; San Jose, CA
November 21, 2026*; 11:00 a.m., MW+		Long Beach State						Provident Credit Union Event Center; San Jose, CA
November 24, 2026*; 5:30 p.m.		at Arizona State						Desert Financial Arena; Tempe, AZ
November 28, 2026*; 2:00 p.m.		at Saint Mary's						University Credit Union Pavilion; Moraga, CA
December 2, 2026*; 7:00 p.m., MW+		Pepperdine						Provident Credit Union Event Center; San Jose, CA
December 5, 2026*; TBA		at Utah State						Dee Glen Smith Spectrum; Logan, UT
December 12, 2026*; 12:00 p.m., MW+		Southern Utah						Provident Credit Union Event Center; San Jose, CA
December 19, 2026*; 2:00 p.m.		at Cal State Bakersfield						Icardo Center; Bakersfield, CA
December 21, 2026*; 1:00 p.m.		at San Diego						Jenny Craig Pavilion; San Diego, CA
Mountain West regular season
December 30, 2026; 7:00 p.m., MW+		Grand Canyon						Provident Credit Union Event Center; San Jose, CA
January 2, 2027; 12:00 p.m., MW+		at New Mexico						The Pit; Albuquerque, NM
January 6, 2027; 7:00 p.m., MW+		UNLV						Provident Credit Union Event Center; San Jose, CA
January 9, 2027; TBA, MW+		at UTEP						Don Haskins Center; El Paso, TX
January 13, 2027; TBA, MW+		at Nevada						Lawlor Events Center; Reno, NV
January 16, 2027; 2:00 p.m., MW+		Air Force						Provident Credit Union Event Center; San Jose, CA
January 20, 2027; 7:00 p.m., MW+		New Mexico						Provident Credit Union Event Center; San Jose, CA
January 23, 2027; 4:00 p.m., MW+		at UC Davis						University Credit Union Center; Davis, CA
January 27, 2027; 7:00 p.m., MW+		Wyoming						Provident Credit Union Event Center; San Jose, CA
January 30, 2027; TBA, MW+		at Hawaii						Stan Sheriff Center; Honolulu, HI
February 6, 2027; 2:00 p.m.		Nevada						Provident Credit Union Event Center; San Jose, CA
February 10, 2027; TBA, MW+		at Grand Canyon						Global Credit Union Arena; Phoenix, AZ
February 13, 2027; TBA, MW+		at Air Force						Clune Arena; USAFA, CO
February 17, 2027; 7:00 p.m., MW+		Hawaii						Provident Credit Union Event Center; San Jose, CA
February 20, 2027; TBA, MW+		UTEP						Provident Credit Union Event Center; San Jose, CA
February 24, 2027; TBA, MW+		at UNLV						Cox Pavilion; Las Vegas, NV
February 27, 2027; 2:00 p.m., MW+		UC Davis						Provident Credit Union Event Center; San Jose, CA
March 2, 2027; 5:30 p.m., MW+		at Wyoming						Arena-Auditorium; Laramie, WY
Mountain West tournament
March 7–10, 2027; TBA		vs.						Thomas & Mack Center; Paradise, NV
*Non-conference game. ^{#}Rankings from AP Poll. (#) Tournament seedings in parentheses. All times are in Pacific.
