= 2026–27 Cal State Fullerton Titans women's basketball team =

American college basketball season

2026–27 Cal State Fullerton Titans women's basketball
- Conference: Big West Conference
- Record: 0–0 (0–0 Big West)
- Head coach: Sammy Doucette (1st season)
- Assistant coaches: Ali Elmi (1st season); Jason Hill (1st season); Jana Pearson (1st season); Brian Brennan (1st season); Meghan McIntyre (1st season)
- Home arena: Titan Gym (Capacity: 4,000)

2026–27 Big West Conference women's basketball standings
	Conf.				Overall
Team	W		L	PCT	W		L	PCT
Cal State Bakersfield	0	–	0	–	0	–	0	–
California Baptist	0	–	0	–	0	–	0	–
Cal Poly	0	–	0	–	0	–	0	–
Cal State Fullerton	0	–	0	–	0	–	0	–
Cal State Northridge	0	–	0	–	0	–	0	–
Long Beach State	0	–	0	–	0	–	0	–
Sacramento State	0	–	0	–	0	–	0	–
UC Irvine	0	–	0	–	0	–	0	–
UC Riverside	0	–	0	–	0	–	0	–
UC San Diego	0	–	0	–	0	–	0	–
UC Santa Barbara	0	–	0	–	0	–	0	–
Utah Valley	0	–	0	–	0	–	0	–
† 2026 Big West tournament winner

The 2026-27 Cal State Fullerton Titans women's basketball team will represent California State University, Fullerton during the 2026-27 NCAA Division I women's basketball season. The Titans are led by first-year head coach Sammy Doucette, and play their home games at Titan Gym in Fullerton, California as a member of the Big West Conference (BWC).

== Previous season ==
The Titans finished the 2025–26 season 18–14, 13–7 in Big West play, to finish in fifth place. As the 5th seed in the Big West Tournament, they lost to (4th seed) Hawaii in Overtime in the Quarterfinals.

== Roster ==
2026–27 Cal State Fullerton Titans women's basketball team
Players	Coaches
Pos. / # / Name / Height / Year / Previous school / Hometown	Head coach: Sammy Doucette (Vanguard); Assistant coach(es): Ali Elmi (Cal Poly); Jason Hill (USC); Jana Pearson (Harding); Legend: (C) Team captain; (S) Suspended; (I) Ineligible; (W) Walk-on; Injured; Current redshirt; Roster; Last update: September 6, 2026

== Schedule and results ==
Date time, TV	Rank^{#}	Opponent^{#}	Result	Record	High points	High rebounds	High assists	Site (attendance) city, state
Regular season
November 2, 2026*; 6:00 p.m., Pac-12 YouTube		at San Diego State	L 51-77	0-1	26 – Swindle	7 – Ffrench	6 – Aragon	Viejas Arena; San Diego, California
November 4, 2026*; 7:00 p.m., ESPN+		Hope International (NAIA)	W 90–59	1–1	20 – Swindle	12 – Ffrench	6 – Aragon	Titan Gym (206); Fullerton, California
November 7, 2026*; 2:00 p.m., ESPN+		Westcliff (NAIA)	W 73–43	2–1	14 – Cassell	5 – Sutisna	4 – Aragon	Titan Gym (179); Fullerton, California
November 12, 2026*; 11:00 a.m., TBD		at UC Davis						University Credit Union Center; Davis, California
November 15, 2026*; 2:00 p.m., ESPN+		Pacific						Titan Gym; Fullerton, California
November 19, 2026*; 7:00 p.m., ESPN+		Weber State						Titan Gym; Fullerton, California
November 24, 2026*; 7:00 p.m., TBD		at Portland State						Viking Pavilion; Portland, Oregon
December 3, 2026; 6:30 p.m., ESPN+		at Sacramento State						Hornets Nest; Sacramento, California
December 5, 2026; 2:00 p.m., ESPN+		at Long Beach State						LBS Financial Credit Union Pyramid; Long Beach, California
December 13, 2026*; 2:00 p.m., ESPN+		Denver						Titan Gym; Fullerton, California
December 18, 2026*; 5:30 p.m., TBD		at Southern Utah						America First Event Center; Cedar City, Utah
December 20, 2026*; 11:00 a.m., ESPN+		Air Force						Titan Gym; Fullerton, California
December 31, 2026; 6:00 p.m., ESPN+		at UC San Diego						LionTree Arena; La Jolla, California
January 2, 2027; 2:00 p.m., ESPN+		at UC Irvine						Bren Events Center; Irvine, California
January 7, 2027; 7:00 p.m., ESPN+		UC Santa Barbara; Conference Home Opener						Titan Gym; Fullerton, California
January 9, 2027; 2:00 p.m., ESPN+		Cal Poly						Titan Gym; Fullerton, California
January 14, 2027; 6:30 p.m., ESPN+		at Cal State Bakersfield						Icardo Center; Bakersfield, California
January 16, 2027; 2:00 p.m., ESPN+		at Cal State Northridge						Premier America Credit Union Arena; Northridge, California
January 21, 2027; 7:00 p.m., ESPN+		UC Irvine						Titan Gym; Fullerton, California
January 23, 2027; 2:00 p.m., ESPN+		UC San Diego						Titan Gym; Fullerton, California
January 28, 2027; 7:00 p.m., ESPN+		UC Riverside						Titan Gym; Fullerton, California
January 30, 2027; 2:00 p.m., ESPN+		California Baptist						Titan Gym; Fullerton, California
February 4, 2027; 6:00 p.m., ESPN+		at Cal Poly						Mott Athletic Center; San Luis Obispo, California
February 6, 2027; 2:00 p.m., ESPN+		at UC Santa Barbara						The Thunderdome; Santa Barbara, California
February 11, 2027; 7:00 p.m., ESPN+		Cal State Northridge						Titan Gym; Fullerton, California
February 13, 2027; 2:00 p.m., ESPN+		Cal State Bakersfield						Titan Gym; Fullerton, California
February 18, 2027; 5:00 p.m., ESPN+		at Utah Valley						UCCU Center; Orem, Utah
February 20, 2027; 2:00 p.m., ESPN+		Long Beach State						Titan Gym; Fullerton, California
February 25, 2027; 7:00 p.m., ESPN+		Sacramento State						Titan Gym; Fullerton, California
February 27, 2027; 7:00 p.m., ESPN+		Utah Valley; Senior Night						Titan Gym; Fullerton, California
March 4, 2027; 6:00 p.m., ESPN+		at California Baptist						Fowler Events Center; Riverside, California
March 6, 2027; 4:00 p.m., ESPN+		at UC Riverside						SRC Arena; Riverside, California
Big West tournament
March 10-13, 2027; TBD, TBD		vs. TBD; Big West Tournament						Lee's Family Forum; Henderson, Nevada
*Non-conference game. ^{#}Rankings from AP poll. (#) Tournament seedings in parentheses. All times are in Pacific.

== See also ==
- 2026–27 Cal State Fullerton Titans men's basketball team
