= Jonas Chatterton =

American basketball coach and former player

Current position
- Title: Head coach
- Team: San Jose State
- Conference: Mountain West
- Record: 4–28 (.125)

Biographical details
- Education: Utah (2000)

Playing career
- 1997–1998: Rocky Mountain

Coaching career (HC unless noted)

Men's basketball
- 1998–2000: Westminster (assistant)

Women's basketball
- 2001–2009: BYU (assistant)
- 2010–2013: Colorado (assistant)
- 2013–2014: Colorado (associate HC)
- 2014–2024: Oregon State (associate HC)
- 2024–2025: Oklahoma (associate HC)
- 2025–present: San Jose State

Head coaching record
- Overall: 4–28 (.125)

Jonas Chatterton is an American basketball coach and former player who is the head coach of the San Jose State Spartans women's basketball team. He played collegiate basketball for one season at Rocky Mountain College, before graduating from the University of Utah with a Bachelor of Science degree.

== Coaching career ==
After beginning his coaching career at Westminster University, Chatterton would go on to be an assistant coach for the BYU Cougars women's basketball team for eight seasons.

On May 3, 2024, Chatterton left Oregon State University after 10 seasons to become the associate head coach of the Oklahoma Sooners women's basketball team.

On April 25, 2025, Chatterton was hired as the 11th head coach in San Jose State University program history, replacing April Phillips who was fired after three seasons with the team.

== Head coaching record ==
Record table
Season	Team	Overall	Conference	Standing	Postseason
San Jose State Spartans (Mountain West Conference) (2025–present)
2025–26	San Jose State	4–28	2–18	T–11th	
2026–27	San Jose State	0–0			
San Jose State:		4–28 (.125)	2–18 (.100)		
Total:		4–18 (.182)			
National champion Postseason invitational champion Conference regular season champion Conference regular season and conference tournament champion Division regular season champion Division regular season and conference tournament champion Conference tournament champion
