= 2026–27 Idaho State Bengals women's basketball team =

American college basketball season

2026–27 Idaho State Bengals women's basketball
- Conference: Big Sky Conference
- Record: 2–1 (0–0 Big Sky)
- Head coach: Seton Sobolewski (19th season)
- Associate head coach: Cassandra Renno
- Assistant coaches: Ashleigh van Vliet; Sydney Bourland
- Home arena: Reed Gym

2026–27 Big Sky women's basketball standings
	Conf.				Overall
Team	W		L	PCT	W		L	PCT
Montana State	0	–	0	–	2	–	0	1.000
Weber State	0	–	0	–	2	–	0	1.000
Idaho	0	–	0	–	2	–	1	.667
Idaho State	0	–	0	–	2	–	1	.667
Northern Colorado	0	–	0	–	2	–	1	.667
Southern Utah	0	–	0	–	2	–	1	.667
Utah Tech	0	–	0	–	1	–	1	.500
Eastern Washington	0	–	0	–	1	–	2	.333
Montana	0	–	0	–	1	–	2	.333
Northern Arizona	0	–	0	–	0	–	2	.000
Portland State	0	–	0	–	0	–	3	.000
† 2027 Big Sky tournament winner As of November 12, 2026

The 2026–27 Idaho State Bengals women's basketball team will represent Idaho State University during the 2026–27 NCAA Division I women's basketball season. The Bengals, led by 19th-year head coach Seton Sobolewski, will play their home games at the Reed Gym in Pocatello, Idaho, and compete as a member of the Big Sky Conference.

== Previous season ==
The Eagles finished the 2025–26 season 19–11 overall and 12–6 in Big Sky play, finishing fourth in the conference. As the No. 6 seed in the Big Sky tournament, they lost in the quarterfinaks to No. 5 Sacramento State 53–62 to end their season.

== Offseason ==
=== Departures ===
Idaho State departures
Name	Number	Pos.	Height	Year	Hometown	Reason for departure
Kacey Spink	1	Guard	5'9"	Senior	Spokane, WA	Graduated
Cam Collman	3	Guard	5'8"	(redshirt) Senior	La Grande, OR	Graduated
Alyse Aby	4	Guard	5'11"	Junior	Laurel, MT	Transferred to Eastern Washington
Tasia Jordan	5	Guard	5'8"	Graduate Student	Melrose Park, IL	Graduated
Molly Hays	7	Guard	5'8"	Sophomore	Cody, WY	Transferred to Montana State Billings (D-II) (Note: Did not play in the 2025–26 season; medical redshirt.)
Tariah Carter	8	Guard	5'11"	Freshman	Melba, ID	Transferred to Fort Lewis (D-II)
Mackenzie Marenchin	12	Forward	6'2"	Sophomore	Windsor, Ontario	Transferred to Windsor (U Sports)
Piper Carlson	14	Forward	6'1"	Junior	Albertville, MN	Graduated
Aurora Elder	20	Forward	6'3"	Sophomore	Perris, CA	Medically retired
Sophia Covello	22	Guard	5'9"	(redshirt) Senior	Roseville, CA	Graduated
Tylie Jones	23	Guard	6'0"	Senior	Rigby, ID	Graduated
Halle Wright	24	Forward	6'0"	Senior	Prosser, WA	Graduated

=== Incoming transfers ===
Idaho State incoming transfers
Name	Number	Pos.	Height	Year	Hometown	Previous school
Bojana Radnijc	4	Guard	5'9"	Junior	Herceg Novi, Montenegro	UC Santa Barbara
Maggie Hutka	24	Forward	6'0"	Senior	Royse City, TX	Montana
Taylin Seren	32	Forward	6'2"	Junior	Westminster, CO	Black Hills State (D-II)
Skylie Barker	34	Guard	5'10"	Sophomore	West Jordan, UT	Utah State Eastern (NJCAA)
Lilly Parke	45	Guard/Forward	6'2"	Graduate Student	Auckland, New Zealand	Fairleigh Dickinson

=== Recruiting class ===
There was no 2026 recruiting class.

== Roster ==
2026–27 Idaho State Bengals women's basketball team
Players
Coaches

Pos.	#	Name	Height	Year	Previous school	Hometown
G	2	Aspen Caldwell	5 ft 7 in (1.7 m)	Sr	Thunder Ridge High School; Utah Valley	Idaho Falls, ID
G	4	Bojana Radnijc	5 ft 9 in (1.75 m)	Jr	UC Santa Barbara	Herceg Novi, Montenegro
G/F	7	Gia Vukona	6 ft 1 in (1.85 m)	Fr	Brisbane State High School	Auckland, New Zealand
F	10	Krystal Arnason	6 ft 1 in (1.85 m)	Fr	Kilsyth Cobras	Leongatha, Australia
G/F	11	Milena Sucacuexe	6 ft 2 in (1.88 m)	RS Fr	Gdessa Barreiro	Barreiro, Portugal
F	13	Ása Wolfram	6 ft 2 in (1.88 m)	Fr	Aþena Basketball	Hveragerði, Iceland
G	18	Maeva Gauffrenet	5 ft 8 in (1.73 m)	So	ESB Villeneuve-d'Ascq	Toucy, France
G	21	Clare Valentine	6 ft 0 in (1.83 m)	Fr	Scripps Ranch High School	San Diego, CA
G	22	Jazzy Wilkerson	6 ft 0 in (1.83 m)	Fr	Woodinville High School	Woodinville, WA
G	23	Emma Bryant	5 ft 8 in (1.73 m)	Fr	Deer Park High School	Spokane, WA
F	24	Maggie Hutka	6 ft 0 in (1.83 m)	Sr	Royse City High School; Montana	Royse City, TX
G/F	25	Aziliz Le Guin	6 ft 1 in (1.85 m)	Fr		Haute-Goulaine, France
F	32	Taylin Seren	6 ft 2 in (1.88 m)	Jr	Standley Lake High School; Black Hills State	Westminster, CO
G	34	Taylin Seren	5 ft 10 in (1.78 m)	Jr	Copper Hills High School; Utah State Eastern	West Jordan, UT
G/F	45	Lilly Parke	6 ft 2 in (1.88 m)	GS	Fairleigh Dickinson	Auckland, New Zealand

Head coach

- Seton Sobolewski (Northern Arizona)

Assistant coach(es)

- Casandra Renno (UC Riverside)
- Ashleigh van Vliet (Idaho State)
- Sydney Bourland (Cal Poly)

Legend

- (C) Team captain
- (S) Suspended
- (I) Ineligible
- (W) Walk-on
- Injured
- Current redshirt

Roster
Last update: October 5, 2026

== Schedule and results ==
Date time, TV	Rank^{#}	Opponent^{#}	Result	Record	High points	High rebounds	High assists	Site (attendance) city, state
Exhibition
October 23, 2026*; 5:00 p.m.		College of Idaho	W 69–53		18 – Caldwell	8 – Valentine	4 – Gauffrenet	Reed Gym; Pocatello, ID
Regular season
November 3, 2026*; 7:00 p.m., ESPN+		at BYU	L 50-67	0-1	12 – Hutka	8 – Hutka	3 – Caldwell	Marriott Center (2,168); Provo, UT
November 6, 2026*; 7:00 p.m., ESPN+		Westminster	W 79-30	1-1	15 – Caldwell	10 – Wilkerson	5 – Bryant	Reed Gym (798); Pocatello, ID
November 9, 2026*; 7:00 p.m., ESPN+		Cal Poly	W 64-51	2-1	18 – Caldwell	11 – Arnason	4 – Radnjic	Reed Gym (705); Pocatello, ID
November 11, 2026*; 4:00 p.m., YouTube		at Utah State	W 54-41	3-1	13 – Caldwell	8 – Hutka	5 – Caldwell	Smith Spectrum (505); Logan, UT
November 15, 2026*; 1:00 p.m.		at South Dakota						Sanford Coyote Sports Center; Vermillion, SD
November 18, 2026*; TBA		at UC Irvine						Bren Events Center; Irvine, CA
November 20, 2026*; 7:00 p.m.		at Loyola Marymount						Gersten Pavilion; Los Angeles, CA
November 22, 2026*; TBA		at UC Riverside						Student Recreation Center Arena; Riverside, CA
November 28, 2026*; 5:00 p.m., ESPN+		Utah Valley						Reed Gym; Pocatello, ID
December 3, 2026; 7:00 p.m., ESPN+		Southern Utah						Reed Gym; Pocatello, ID
December 5, 2026; 7:00 p.m., ESPN+		Utah Tech						Reed Gym; Pocatello, ID
December 18, 2026*; 8:00 p.m.		vs. Oregon State; Maui Classic						Seabury Hall; Maui, HI
December 19, 2026*; 5:30 p.m.		vs. San Francisco; Maui Classic						Seabury Hall; Maui, HI
January 2, 2027; 2:00 p.m., ESPN+		at Northern Arizona						Findlay Toyota Court; Flagstaff, AZ
January 7, 2027; 7:00 p.m., ESPN+		at Montana State						Worthington Arena; Bozeman, MT
January 9, 2027; 2:00 p.m., ESPN+		at Montana						Dahlberg Arena; Missoula, MT
January 14, 2027; 7:00 p.m., ESPN+		Northern Colorado						Reed Gym; Pocatello, ID
January 16, 2027; 2:00 p.m., ESPN+		Portland State						Reed Gym; Pocatello, ID
January 18, 2027; 7:00 p.m., ESPN+		Eastern Washington						Reed Gym; Pocatello, ID
January 23, 2027; 4:00 p.m., ESPN+		Weber State						Reed Gym; Pocatello, ID
January 25, 2027; 7:00 p.m., ESPN+		Idaho						Reed Gym; Pocatello, ID
January 28, 2027; 7:00 p.m., ESPN+		at Utah Tech						Burns Arena; St. George, UT
January 30, 2026; 2:00 p.m., ESPN+		at Southern Utah						America First Event Center; Cedar City, UT
February 4, 2027; 7:00 p.m., ESPN+		Northern Arizona						Reed Gym; Pocatello, ID
February 11, 2027; 7:00 p.m., ESPN+		at Portland State						Viking Pavilion; Portland, OR
February 13, 2027; 2:00 p.m., ESPN+		at Northern Colorado						Bank of Colorado Arena; Greeley, CO
February 18, 2027; 7:00 p.m., ESPN+		Montana						Reed Gym; Pocatello, ID
February 20, 2027; 2:00 p.m., ESPN+		Montana State						Reed Gym; Pocatello, ID
February 22, 2027; 7:00 p.m., ESPN+		at Eastern Washington						Reese Court; Cheney, WA
February 27, 2027; 2:00 p.m., ESPN+		at Weber State						Dee Events Center; Ogden, UT
March 1, 2027; 7:00 p.m., ESPN+		at Idaho						ICCU Arena; Moscow, ID
Big Sky tournament
March 5–10, 2027; TBA		vs.						Idaho Central Arena; Boise, ID
*Non-conference game. ^{#}Rankings from AP Poll. (#) Tournament seedings in parentheses. All times are in Pacific.
