= 2026–27 Montana Lady Griz basketball team =

Intercollegiate basketball season

2026–27 Montana Lady Griz basketball
- Conference: Big Sky Conference
- Record: 0–0 (0–0 Big Sky)
- Head coach: Nate Harris (2nd season)
- Assistant coaches: Lindsay Woolley; Kayla Anderson; Britt Cooper; Leia Battie
- Home arena: Dahlberg Arena

2026–27 Big Sky women's basketball standings
	Conf.				Overall
Team	W		L	PCT	W		L	PCT
Eastern Washington	0	–	0	–	0	–	0	–
Idaho	0	–	0	–	0	–	0	–
Idaho State	0	–	0	–	0	–	0	–
Montana	0	–	0	–	0	–	0	–
Montana State	0	–	0	–	0	–	0	–
Northern Arizona	0	–	0	–	0	–	0	–
Northern Colorado	0	–	0	–	0	–	0	–
Portland State	0	–	0	–	0	–	0	–
Southern Utah	0	–	0	–	0	–	0	–
Utah Tech	0	–	0	–	0	–	0	–
Weber State	0	–	0	–	0	–	0	–
† 2027 Big Sky tournament winner

The 2026–27 Montana Lady Griz basketball team will represent the University of Montana during the 2026–27 NCAA Division I women's basketball season. The Lady Griz, led by second-year head coach Nate Harris, will play their home games on the Robin Selvig Court at Dahlberg Arena in Missoula, Montana, and compete as a member of the Big Sky Conference.

== Previous season ==
Under Nate Harris' first season as head coach, the Lady Griz finished the 2025–26 season 9–22 overall and 5–13 in Big Sky play, to finish eighth in the conference. As the No. 8 seed in the Big Sky tournament, they defeated No. 7 Northern Arizona 61–60 in the first round, before being routed by in-state rivals No. 2 Montana State 57–78 in the quarterfinals to end their season.

Their 9–22 record was the second worst in program history, only beaten by the 2015–16 team's record of 7–23.

== Offseason ==
=== Departures ===
Montana departures
Name	Number	Pos.	Height	Year	Hometown	Reason for departure
Zoey Washington	0	Guard	5'8"	Junior	Mahtomedi, MN	Left team
Macy Donarski	1	Guard	5'8"	(redshirt) Sophomore	La Crosse, WI	Left team
Mack Konig	2	Guard	5'9"	Senior	Milton, Ontario	Graduated
Draya Wacker	3	Guard	5'8"	(redshirt) Junior	Melstone, MT	Graduated, transferred to Weber State
Chloe Larsen	12	Guard	5'10"	Sophomore	Missoula, MT	Transferred to Montana Tech (NAIA)
Lauren Dick	14	Guard	5'10"	Senior	Missoula, MT	Graduated
Maggie Hutka	24	Forward	6'0"	(redshirt) Junior	Royse City, TX	Transferred to Idaho State
Adria Lincoln	33	Guard	6'1"	Junior	Monroe, WA	Transferred to Montana State
Alex Pirog	34	Forward	6'3"	Senior	Highlands Ranch, CO	Graduated, transferred to Northern Colorado (Note: Did not play in the 2025–26 season.)

=== Incoming transfers ===
Montana incoming transfers
Name	Number	Pos.	Height	Year	Hometown	Previous school
Shay Shippen	0	Guard	5'11"	Sophomore	Idaho Falls, ID	Columbia
Paige Lofing	1	Guard	5'9"	Sophomore	Huntley, MT	Gonzaga
Dom Nesland	9	Guard	5'9"	Junior	Phoenix, AZ	High Point
Alyssa Blanck	13	Forward	6'2"	5th Year	Salt Lake City, UT	Utah
Kennedy Moore	15	Forward	6'2"	Junior	Kalispell, MT	Wake Forest

=== Recruiting class ===
There was no 2026 recruiting class.

== Roster ==
Years are listed according to the new NCAA age-based eligibility model.

2026–27 Montana Lady Griz women's basketball team
Players
Coaches

Pos.	#	Name	Height	Year	Previous school	Hometown
G	0	Shay Shippen	5 ft 11 in (1.8 m)	So	Skyline High School; Columbia	Idaho Falls, ID
G	1	Paige Lofing	5 ft 9 in (1.75 m)	So	Huntley Project High School; Gonzaga	Huntley, MT
G	2	Avery DeCoite	5 ft 7 in (1.7 m)	Fr	Big Sky High School	Missoula, MT
F	3	Hayden Kaut	6 ft 2 in (1.88 m)	Fr	Napavine High School	Napavine, WA
G	4	Kamryn Reinker	5 ft 11 in (1.8 m)	Fr	Billings Central Catholic High School	Billings, MT
G	5	Kennedy Gillette	6 ft 0 in (1.83 m)	Sr	Sugar-Salem High School; College of Southern Idaho	Rexburg, ID
G	7	Kate Holmquist	5 ft 7 in (1.7 m)	Fr	Maple Grove High School	Maple Grove, MN
G	9	Dom Nesland	5 ft 9 in (1.75 m)	Jr	Xavier College Prep; High Point	Phoenix, AZ
G	10	Avery Waddington	6 ft 3 in (1.91 m)	Jr	Lake City High School	Coeur d'Alene, ID
G	11	Aby Shubert	5 ft 8 in (1.73 m)	Sr	Kasson-Mantorville High School; Xavier	Kasson, MN
F	13	Alyssa Blanck (5th)	6 ft 2 in (1.88 m)	Sr	Olympus High School; Utah	Salt Lake City, UT
F	15	Kennedy Moore	6 ft 2 in (1.88 m)	Jr	Flathead High School; Wake Forest	Kalispell, MT
G	20	Rae Ehrman	5 ft 10 in (1.78 m)	So	Eden Prairie High School	Eden Prairie, MN
G	22	Ava Cossette	5 ft 10 in (1.78 m)	Jr	Maple Grove High School; South Dakota	Maple Grove, MN
F	23	Jocelyn Land	6 ft 0 in (1.83 m)	Jr	Holy Family Catholic High School; Butler	Chanhassen, MN

Head coach

- Nate Harris (Montana Tech)

Assistant coach(es)

- Lindsay Woolley (Montana)
- Kayla Anderson (Utah Valley)
- Britt Cooper (Montana Western)
- Leia Beattie (Northern Arizona)

Legend

- (C) Team captain
- (S) Suspended
- (I) Ineligible
- (W) Walk-on
- (5th) Fifth year senior
- Injured
- Current redshirt

Roster
Last update: October 6, 2026

== Schedule and results ==
Date time, TV	Rank^{#}	Opponent^{#}	Result	Record	High points	High rebounds	High assists	Site (attendance) city, state
Regular season
November 3, 2026*; 7:00 p.m.		Montana Western						Dahlberg Arena; Missoula, MT
November 7, 2026*; 2:00 p.m.		at BYU						Marriott Center; Provo, UT
November 10, 2026*; 10:00 a.m.		at Kansas State						Bramlage Coliseum; Manhattan, KS
November 13, 2026*; 7:00 p.m.		Houston						Dahlberg Arena; Missoula, MT
November 18, 2026*; 7:00 p.m., SWX		at Gonzaga						McCarthey Athletic Center; Spokane, WA
November 22, 2026*; 2:00 p.m.		Montana State–Northern						Dahlberg Arena; Missoula, MT
November 24, 2026*; 7:00 p.m.		Carroll						Dahlberg Arena; Missoula, MT
November 29, 2026*; 2:00 p.m.		at Seattle						Redhawk Center; Seattle, WA
December 3, 2026; 7:00 p.m.		Northern Arizona						Dahlberg Arena; Missoula, MT
December 13, 2026*; 3:00 p.m.		at UC Davis						University Credit Union Center; Davis, CA
December 15, 2026*; 7:00 p.m.		at Utah						Jon M. Huntsman Center; Salt Lake City, UT
December 19, 2026*; 2:00 p.m.		South Dakota						Dahlberg Arena; Missoula, MT
December 31, 2026; 2:00 p.m.		at Northern Colorado						Bank of Colorado Arena; Greeley, CO
January 2, 2027; 3:00 p.m.		at Portland State						Viking Pavilion; Portland, OR
January 7, 2027; 7:00 p.m.		Weber State						Dahlberg Arena; Missoula, MT
January 9, 2027; 2:00 p.m.		Idaho State						Dahlberg Arena; Missoula, MT
January 14, 2027; 7:00 p.m.		at Idaho						ICCU Arena; Moscow, ID
January 16, 2027; 3:00 p.m.		at Eastern Washington						Reese Court; Cheney, WA
January 18, 2027; 2:00 p.m.		Utah Tech						Dahlberg Arena; Missoula, MT
January 23, 2027; 2:00 p.m.		at Montana State						Worthington Arena; Bozeman, MT
January 25, 2026; 6:30 p.m., ESPN+		at Southern Utah						America First Event Center; Cedar City, UT
January 30, 2027; 2:00 p.m.		at Northern Arizona						Findlay Toyota Court; Flagstaff, AZ
February 3, 2027; 7:00 p.m.		Portland State						Dahlberg Arena; Missoula, MT
February 6, 2027; 2:00 p.m.		Northern Colorado						Dahlberg Arena; Missoula, MT
February 11, 2027; 7:00 p.m.		Eastern Washington						Dahlberg Arena; Missoula, MT
February 13, 2027; 2:00 p.m.		Idaho						Dahlberg Arena; Missoula, MT
February 18, 2027; 7:00 p.m.		Idaho State						Reed Gym; Pocatello, ID
February 20, 2027; 2:00 p.m.		at Weber State						Dee Events Center; Ogden, UT
February 22, 2027; 7:00 p.m.		at Utah Tech						Burns Arena; St. George, UT
February 27, 2027; 2:00 p.m.		Montana State						Dahlberg Arena; Missoula, MT
March 1, 2027; 7:00 p.m.		Southern Utah						Dahlberg Arena; Missoula, MT
Big Sky tournament
March 5–10, 2027; TBA		vs.						Idaho Central Arena; Boise, ID
*Non-conference game. ^{#}Rankings from AP Poll. (#) Tournament seedings in parentheses. All times are in Mountain.
