= Cal State Fullerton Titans women's basketball =

Cal State Fullerton Titans
2026–27 Cal State Fullerton Titans women's basketball team
- University: California State University, Fullerton
- Head coach: Sammy Doucette (1st season)
- Location: Fullerton, California
- Arena: Titan Gym (capacity: 4,000)
- Conference: Big West
- Nickname: Titans
- Colors: Navy blue, white, and orange

NCAA Division I tournament round of 32
- 1991

NCAA Division I tournament appearances
- 1989, 1991

AIAW tournament Final Four
- 1972, 1975
Other AIAW tournament results
Second round	1972, 1974, 1975, 1976, 1977
Appearances	1972, 1974, 1975, 1976, 1977

Uniforms
Home	Away	Alternate

The Cal State Fullerton Titans women's basketball team is the basketball team that represents California State University, Fullerton in Fullerton, California. The school's team currently competes in the Big West Conference.

== History ==
The Titans have a 575–706 all-time record as of the end of the 2015–16 season.

In 1970, the Titans were invited to the national tournament sponsored by the CIAW (a predecessor to the AIAW.) The Titans defeated West Chester to win the national championship 50–46. This is the last national tournament to play using six player rules — the following year the format converted to five player rules.

Cal State Fullerton has qualified for the NCAA Tournament twice, in 1989 and 1991. They have a record of 1–2. They went to the NWIT in 1985, lost in the first round, then won the next two rounds to finish fifth.

On February 3, 2013, women's basketball assistant coach Monica Quan, 28, was found dead on a parking structure at a condominium complex.

== Yearly record ==
Record table
Season	Coach	Overall	Conference	Standing	Postseason
Billie Moore (WCAA) (1969–1976)
1969–70	Billie Moore	17–1		1st	CIAW National Champions
1970–71	Billie Moore	20–1		1st	CIAW First Round
1971–72	Billie Moore	19–1		1st	AIAW Third Place
1972–73	Billie Moore	13–1		1st	
1973–74	Billie Moore	19–2		1st	AIAW Quarterfinals
1974–75	Billie Moore	19–2		1st	AIAW Semifinals
1975–76	Billie Moore	14–5		1st	AIAW Quarterfinals
Billie Moore:		121–13 (.903)			
Billie Moore (PCAA) (1976–1977)
1976–77	Billie Moore	19–2	6–2	1st	AIAW First Round
Billie Moore:		19–2 (.905)	6–2 (.750)		
Nancy Dunkle (PCAA) (1977–1979)
1977–78	Nancy Dunkle	16–9	5–3	2nd	
1978–79	Nancy Dunkle	12–14	3–5	4th	
Nancy Dunkle:		28–23 (.549)	8–8 (.500)		
Chris Gobrecht (PCAA) (1979–1985)
1979–80	Chns Gobrecht	7–23	2–10	unknown	
1980–81	Chris Gobrecht	10–20	2–10	6th	
1981-82	Chris Gobrecht	18–12	3–9	6th	
1982-83	Chris Gobrecht	13–15	3–11	6th	
1983-84	Chris Gobrecht	17–11	7–7	4th	
1984-85	Chris Gobrecht	19–11	8–6	5th	NWIT fifth place
Chris Gobrecht:		84–92 (.477)	25–53 (.321)		
Maryalyce Jeremiah (Big West Conference) (1985–1992)
1985–86	Maryalyce Jeremiah	11–18	8–6	3rd	
1986–87	Maryalyce Jeremiah	12–16	9–9	T-6th	
1987–88	Maryalyce Jeremiah	18–11	12–6	3rd	
1988–89	Maryalyce Jeremiah	21–9	12–6	T-4th	NCAA first round
1989–90	Maryalyce Jeremiah	14–14	9–9	5th	
1990–91	Maryalyce Jeremiah	25–8	14–4	3rd	NCAA second round
1991–92	Maryalyce Jeremiah	11–17	6–12	8th	
Maryalyce Jeremiah:		112–93 (.546)	70–52 (.574)		
Debbie Ayres (Big West Conference) (1992–1997)
1992–93	Debbie Ayres	8–19	5–13	7th	
1993–94	Debbie Ayres	5–22	4–14	8th	
1994–95	Debbie Ayres	14–15	8–10	7th	
1995–96	Debbie Ayres	7–20	4–14	8th	
1996–97	Debbie Ayres	10–16	5–10	5th West	
Debbie Ayres:		44–92 (.324)	26–61 (.299)		
Denise Curry (Big West Conference) (1997–2000)
1997–98	Denise Curry	10–17	7–8	3rd West	
1998–99	Denise Curry	4–22	2–13	6th West	
1999-00	Denise Curry	2–25	1–14	6th West	
Denise Curry:		16–64 (.200)	10–35 (.222)		
Barbara Ehardt (Big West Conference) (2000–2003)
2000–01	Barbara Ehardt	1–27	1–13	8th	
2001–02	Barbara Ehardt	4–24	2–14	T-8th	
2002–03	Barbara Ehardt	7–21	5–11	T-7th	
Barbara Ehardt:		12–72 (.143)	8–38 (.174)		
Maryalyce Jeremiah (Big West Conference) (2003–2009)
2003–04	Maryalyce Jeremiah	9–20	8–10	T-5th	
2004–05	Maryalyce Jeremiah	8–20	6–12	T-7th	
2005–06	Maryalyce Jeremiah	11–17	7–7	T-3rd	
2006–07	Maryalyce Jeremiah	16–16	7–7	5th	
2007–08	Maryalyce Jeremiah	11–19	8–8	T-5th	
2008–09	Maryalyce Jeremiah	10–20	5–11	6th	
Maryalyce Jeremiah:		65–112 (.367)	41–55 (.427)		
Marcia Foster (Big West Conference) (2009–2013)
2009–10	Marcia Foster	15–17	8–8	6th	
2010–11	Marcia Foster	9–21	5–11	T-7th	
2011–12	Marcia Foster	11–19	4–12	8th	
2012–13	Marcia Foster	11–22	5–13	8th	
Marcia Foster:		46–79 (.368)	22–44 (.333)		
Daron Park (Big West Conference) (2013–2017)
2013–14	Daron Park	12–18	8–8	T-6th	
2014–15	Daron Park	13–19	5–11	7th	
2015–16	Daron Park	3–27	1–15	9th	
2016–17	Daron Park	4–25	1–15	9th	
Daron Park:		32–89 (.264)	15–49 (.234)		
Jeff Harada (Big West Conference) (2017–2025)
2017–18	Jeff Harada	8–21	3–13	9th	
2018–19	Jeff Harada	14–16	6–10	6th	
2019–20	Jeff Harada	17–14	8–8	5th	
2020–21	Jeff Harada	4–18	2–14	10th	
2021–22	Jeff Harada	11–18	5–12	8th	
2022–23	Jeff Harada	14–16	9–11	7th	
2023–24	Jeff Harada	10–21	6–14	9th	
2024–25	Jeff Harada	7–23	5–15	9th	
Jeff Harada:		85–147 (.366)	44–97 (.312)		
John Bonner (Big West Conference) (2025–2026)
2025–26	John Bonner	18–14	13–7	5th	
John Bonner:		18–14 (.563)	13–7 (.650)		
Total:		682–892 (.433)			
National champion Postseason invitational champion Conference regular season champion Conference regular season and conference tournament champion Division regular season champion Division regular season and conference tournament champion Conference tournament champion

== Postseason results ==
=== NCAA Division I ===
Year	Seed	Round	Opponent	Result
1989	#7	First Round	#10 Montana	L 67–82
1991	#7	First Round; Second Round	#10 Louisiana Tech #2 Stanford	W 84–80; L 67–91

=== AIAW Division I ===
The Titans made five appearances in the AIAW National Division I basketball tournament, with a combined record of 8–8.

Year	Round	Opponent	Result
1972	First Round; Quarterfinals; Semifinals; Third Place Game	Tennessee Tech; Phillips; West Chester State; Mississippi Women	W 65–56; W 53–38; L 57–62; W 52–42
1974	First Round; Quarterfinals; Consolation Second Round	Western Washington; Southern Connecticut; Wayland Baptist	W 58–40; L 53–55 (2OT); L 39–54
1975	First Round; Quarterfinals; Semifinals; Third Place Game	William Penn; Queens (NY); Immaculata; Southern Connecticut	W 59–43; W 64–58; L 68–71; W 63–46
1976	First Round; Quarterfinals; Consolation Second Round	Wisconsin–La Crosse; William Penn; Southern Connecticut	W 103–85; L 61–64; L 51–61
1977	First Round; Consolation First Round	Mississippi College; Tennessee Tech	L 84–97; L 67–70
