= 2026–27 Montana State Bobcats women's basketball team =

American college basketball season

2026–27 Montana State Bobcats women's basketball
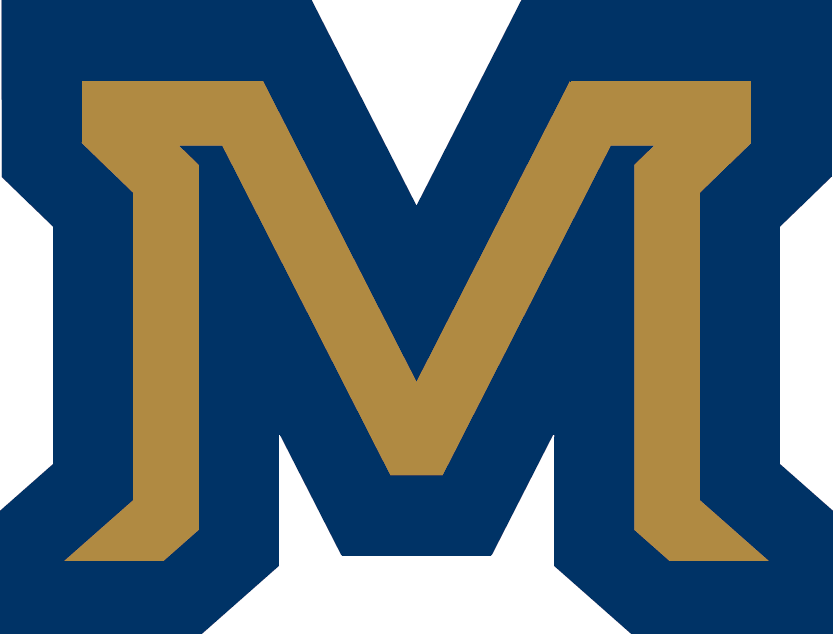
- Conference: Big Sky Conference
- Record: 2–1 (0–0 Big Sky)
- Head coach: Tricia Binford (22nd season)
- Associate head coach: Sunny Smallwood; Ryan Johnson
- Assistant coach: Devin Perez
- Home arena: Worthington Arena

2026–27 Big Sky women's basketball standings
	Conf.				Overall
Team	W		L	PCT	W		L	PCT
Weber State	0	–	0	–	4	–	1	.800
Northern Colorado	0	–	0	–	4	–	1	.800
Idaho State	0	–	0	–	4	–	2	.667
Idaho	0	–	0	–	3	–	1	.750
Montana State	0	–	0	–	2	–	1	.667
Southern Utah	0	–	0	–	3	–	2	.600
Utah Tech	0	–	0	–	3	–	2	.600
Eastern Washington	0	–	0	–	2	–	2	.500
Northern Arizona	0	–	0	–	1	–	3	.250
Montana	0	–	0	–	1	–	4	.200
Portland State	0	–	0	–	0	–	6	.000
† 2027 Big Sky tournament winner As of November 20, 2026

The 2026–27 Montana State Bobcats women's basketball team will represent Montana State University during the 2026–27 NCAA Division I women's basketball season. The Bobcats, led by 22nd-year head coach Tricia Binford, will play their home games at Worthington Arena, located in the Brick Breeden Fieldhouse in Bozeman, Montana, and compete as a member of the Big Sky Conference.

== Previous season ==
The Bobcats finished the 2025–26 season 27–8 overall and 16–2 in Big Sky play, finishing second in the conference. As the No. 2 seed in the Big Sky tournament, they defeated No. 8 Montana 78–57 and No. 6 Eastern Washington 79–77 in overtime to advance to the championship game for the second straight season, where they lost 57–60 to top-seeded Idaho.

As a No. 2 seed that did not receive a bid to the Division I tournament or the WBIT, the Bobcats earned and accepted an automatic bid to the WNIT, making it their second appearance in the tournament and first since 2016. They earned a bye to Round 2, where they defeated San Francisco 53–69 to win their first ever national postseason game in program history. They then defeated Portland in the Super 16 to advance to the Great 8, where they lost to South Dakota 56–65 to end their season.

== Offseason ==
=== Departures ===
Montana State departures
Name	Number	Pos.	Height	Year	Hometown	Reason for departure
Courtney Smith	2	Guard	6'1"	Freshman	London, ON	Transferred to Morehead State
Heidi Smith	9	Guard	6'1"	Freshman	London, ON	Transferred to Morehead State
Grace Hintz	13	Guard	5'8"	Freshman	Lynden, WA	Transferred to Weber State
Drea Brumfield	—	Forward	6'2"	(redshirt) Junior	Chehalis, WA	Graduated

=== Incoming transfers ===
Montana State incoming transfers
Name	Number	Pos.	Height	Year	Hometown	Previous school
Ebele Mbagwu	4	Guard	5'6"	Senior	Bakersfield, CA	Miles CC (NJCAA)
Braeden Gunlock	22	Forward	6'0"	Sophomore	Bigfork, MT	BYU

=== Recruiting class ===
There was no 2026 recruiting class.

== Roster ==
Years are listed according to the new NCAA age-based eligibility model.

2026–27 Montana State Bobcats women's basketball team
Players
Coaches

Pos.	#	Name	Height	Year	Previous school	Hometown
G	0	Madison O'Connor	5 ft 10 in (1.78 m)	Fr	Baker High School	Baker, MT
G	4	Ebele Mbagwu	5 ft 6 in (1.68 m)	Sr	Stockdale High School; Miles CC	Bakersfield, CA
F	5	Ella Johnson	6 ft 2 in (1.88 m)	Sr	Elk River High School	Elk River, MN
F	11	Emma Donglemans	6 ft 5 in (1.96 m)	Fr	King's Christian Collegiate	Orillia, ON
G	12	Jamison Philip	5 ft 7 in (1.7 m)	So	Ellensburg High School	Ellensburg, WA
G	15	Isobel Bunyan	6 ft 0 in (1.83 m)	Sr	Cardiff Met Archers	Tonyrefail, Wales
G	20	Brooke Fatupaito (5th)	6 ft 0 in (1.83 m)	Sr	Skyview High School; New Mexico	Billings, MT
G	21	Brianne Bailey	5 ft 10 in (1.78 m)	So	South Fremont High School	St. Anthony, ID
F	22	Braeden Gunlock	6 ft 0 in (1.83 m)	So	Bigfork High School; BYU	Bigfork, MT
F	23	Teagan Erickson	6 ft 2 in (1.88 m)	Jr	Saco High School	Saco, MT
G	24	Kadynce Couture	5 ft 8 in (1.73 m)	So	Big Sky High School	Missoula, MT
G	30	Dylan Philip (5th)	5 ft 8 in (1.73 m)	Sr	Ellensburg High School	Ellensburg, WA
F	33	Addison Harris	6 ft 1 in (1.85 m)	Jr	Camas High School	Camas, WA
G	44	Taylee Chirrick	5 ft 11 in (1.8 m)	Jr	Roberts High School	Roberts, MT

Head coach

- Tricia Binford (Boise State)

Assistant coach(es)

- Sunny Smallwood (Boise State)
- Ryan Johnson (DePauw)
- Devin Perez (Ottawa)

Legend

- (C) Team captain
- (S) Suspended
- (I) Ineligible
- (W) Walk-on
- Injured
- Current redshirt

Roster
Last update: October 1, 2026

== Schedule and results ==
Date time, TV	Rank^{#}	Opponent^{#}	Result	Record	High points	High rebounds	High assists	Site (attendance) city, state
Exhibition
October 14, 2026*; 7:00 p.m.		Cedarville	W 102–42		–	–	–	Worthington Arena; Bozeman, MT
October 25, 2026*; 1:00 p.m.		South Dakota Mines						Worthington Arena; Bozeman, MT
Regular season
November 2, 2026*; 11:00 a.m.		Black Hills State	W 82–38	1–0	15 – Bailey	7 – Bailey	4 – Chirrick	Worthington Arena (5,426); Bozeman, MT
November 8, 2026*; 2:00 p.m.		Portland	W 75–65	2–0	27 – Harris	13 – Chirrick	4 – J. Philip	Worthington Arena (2,404); Bozeman, MT
November 15, 2026*; 2:00 p.m.		at UNLV	Canceled					Cox Pavilion; Paradise, NV
November 19, 2026*; 6:00 p.m., B1G+		at No. 8 Iowa	L 60–76	2–1	14 – O'Connor	11 – Chirrick	3 – Tied	Carver–Hawkeye Arena (12,793); Iowa City, IA
November 24, 2026*; 2:00 p.m.		vs. Oklahoma; Jacksonville Classic						The Reef; Jacksonville, FL
November 25, 2026*; 2:00 p.m.		vs. Middle Tennessee; Jacksonville Classic						The Reef; Jacksonville, FL
December 5, 2026; 2:00 p.m., ESPN+		Northern Arizona						Worthington Arena; Bozeman, MT
December 7, 2026*; TBA		at Houston						Fertitta Center; Houston, TX
December 10, 2026*; 7:00 p.m., ESPN+		Montana State Billings						Worthington Arena; Bozeman, MT
December 13, 2026*; 2:00 p.m., ESPN+		South Dakota State						Worthington Arena; Bozeman, MT
December 19, 2026*; TBA		at Oregon						Matthew Knight Arena; Eugene, OR
December 21, 2026*; 2:00 p.m.		at Santa Clara						Leavey Center; Santa Clara, CA
December 31, 2026; TBA		at Portland State						Viking Pavilion; Portland, OR
January 2, 2027; 2:00 p.m.		at Northern Colorado						Bank of Colorado Arena; Greeley, CO
January 7, 2027; 7:00 p.m., ESPN+		Idaho State						Worthington Arena; Bozeman, MT
January 9, 2027; 2:00 p.m., ESPN+		Weber State						Worthington Arena; Bozeman, MT
January 14, 2027; TBA		at Eastern Washington						Reese Court; Cheney, WA
January 16, 2027; TBA		at Idaho						ICCU Arena; Moscow, ID
January 18, 2027; 7:00 p.m., ESPN+		Southern Utah						Worthington Arena; Bozeman, MT
January 23, 2027; 2:00 p.m., ESPN+		Montana						Worthington Arena; Bozeman, MT
January 25, 2027; TBA		at Utah Tech						Burns Arena; St. George, UT
January 28, 2027; TBA		at Northern Arizona						Rolle Activity Center; Flagstaff, AZ
February 4, 2027; 7:00 p.m., ESPN+		Northern Colorado						Worthington Arena; Bozeman, MT
February 6, 2027; 2:00 p.m., ESPN+		Portland State						Worthington Arena; Bozeman, MT
February 11, 2027; 7:00 p.m., ESPN+		Idaho						Worthington Arena; Bozeman, MT
February 13, 2027; 2:00 p.m., ESPN+		Eastern Washington						Worthington Arena; Bozeman, MT
February 18, 2027; TBA		at Weber State						Dee Events Center; Ogden, UT
February 20, 2027; 2:00 p.m.		at Idaho State						Reed Gym; Pocatello, ID
February 22, 2027; TBA		at Southern Utah						America First Event Center; Cedar City, UT
February 27, 2027; 2:00 p.m.		at Montana						Dahlberg Arena; Missoula, MT
March 1, 2027; 7:00 p.m., ESPN+		Utah Tech						Worthington Arena; Bozeman, MT
Big Sky tournament
March 5–10, 2027; TBA		vs.						Idaho Central Arena; Boise, ID
*Non-conference game. ^{#}Rankings from AP Poll. (#) Tournament seedings in parentheses. All times are in Mountain.
