= 2026–27 Eastern Washington Eagles women's basketball team =

American college basketball season

2026–27 Eastern Washington Eagles women's basketball
- Conference: Big Sky Conference
- Record: 1–2 (0–0 Big Sky)
- Head coach: Joddie Gleason (6th season)
- Associate head coach: Skip Gleason
- Assistant coaches: Dora Goles; Brynna Maxwell; Jaela Eggers
- Home arena: Reese Court

2026–27 Big Sky women's basketball standings
	Conf.				Overall
Team	W		L	PCT	W		L	PCT
Montana State	0	–	0	–	2	–	0	1.000
Weber State	0	–	0	–	2	–	0	1.000
Idaho State	0	–	0	–	3	–	1	.750
Idaho	0	–	0	–	2	–	1	.667
Northern Colorado	0	–	0	–	2	–	1	.667
Southern Utah	0	–	0	–	2	–	1	.667
Utah Tech	0	–	0	–	2	–	1	.667
Eastern Washington	0	–	0	–	1	–	2	.333
Montana	0	–	0	–	1	–	2	.333
Northern Arizona	0	–	0	–	0	–	2	.000
Portland State	0	–	0	–	0	–	4	.000
† 2027 Big Sky tournament winner As of November 14, 2026

The 2026–27 Eastern Washington Eagles women's basketball team will represent Eastern Washington University during the 2026–27 NCAA Division I women's basketball season. The Eagles, led by sixth-year head coach Joddie Gleason, will play their home games at Reese Court in Cheney, Washington, and compete as a member of the Big Sky Conference.

== Previous season ==
The Eagles finished the 2025–26 season 15–18 overall and 7–11 in Big Sky play, finishing sixth in the conference. As the No. 6 seed in the Big Sky tournament, they defeated No. 3 Northern Colorado 55–53 in the quarterfinals, before falling in the semifinals to No. 2 Montana State 77–79 in overtime to end their season.

== Offseason ==
=== Departures ===
Eastern Washington departures
Name	Number	Pos.	Height	Year	Hometown	Reason for departure
Ella Gallatin	2	Guard	5'10"	Senior	Snohomish, WA	Graduated
Autumn Agnew	4	Guard	5'8"	Junior	Spokane Valley, WA	Transferred to The College of Idaho (NAIA)
Paris Kirk	12	Forward	6'2"	Senior	Kelowna, British Columbia	Graduated
Léa-line Romain	21	Guard	5'10"	Sophomore	Paris, France	Transferred to South Dakota Mines (D-II)
Brielle Magnuson	24	Guard	5'10"	Junior	Meridian, ID	Transferred to Fort Lewis (D-II)
Addison Hall	41	Forward	5'10"	Senior	Winlock, WA	Graduated
Camille Jentzsch	44	Forward	6'3"	(redshirt) Sophomore	Lake Stevens, WA	Graduated
Bella Hays	52	Center	6'4"	(redshirt) Junior	Wasilla, AK	Transferred to Alaska Anchorage (D-II)

=== Incoming transfers ===
Eastern Washington incoming transfers
Name	Number	Pos.	Height	Year	Hometown	Previous school
Alyse Aby	4	Guard	6'0"	Senior	Laurel, MT	Idaho State
Camille Dake	5	Forward	6'0"	(redshirt) Freshman	Vista, CA	Portland (Note: Did not play in the 2025–26 season.)

=== Recruiting class ===
There was no 2026 recruiting class.

== Roster ==
2026–27 Eastern Washington Eagles women's basketball team
Players
Coaches

Pos.	#	Name	Height	Year	Previous school	Hometown
G	0	Deets Parrish	5 ft 8 in (1.73 m)	Fr	A.C. Davis High School	Satus, WA
G	1	Elyn Bowers	5 ft 8 in (1.73 m)	So	Pinedale High School	Pinedale, WY
G	2	Caitie Gingras	5 ft 9 in (1.75 m)	RS Jr	Edge Prep; Cal State Bakersfield	Vernon, British Columbia
G	3	Madeline Gibbs	5 ft 11 in (1.8 m)	So	Cherokee Trail High School	Aurora, CO
G	4	Alyse Aby	6 ft 0 in (1.83 m)	Sr	Laurel High School; Idaho State	Laurel, MT
F	5	Camille Dake	6 ft 0 in (1.83 m)	RS Fr	Rancho Buena Vista High School; Portland	Vista, CA
F	10	Jaecy Eggers	6 ft 2 in (1.88 m)	Jr	Woodinville High School	Woodinville, WA
F	14	Martina Gelablert Blanco	6 ft 0 in (1.83 m)	Fr		Barcelona, Spain
G	15	Emma Myers	5 ft 11 in (1.8 m)	So	Ridgeline High School	Spokane Valley, WA
F	22	Kourtney Grossman	6 ft 0 in (1.83 m)	Jr	Billings West High School	Billings, MT
G	23	Emily McElmurry	5 ft 9 in (1.75 m)	Jr	Sentinel High School	Missoula, MT
G	24	Dylyn Dress	5 ft 10 in (1.78 m)	So	Kennewick High School	Kennewick, WA
G	25	Jada Davis	5 ft 7 in (1.7 m)	Fr	Gallatin County High School	Bozeman, MT
F	50	Grace DeHoog	6 ft 2 in (1.88 m)	Fr	Nooksack Valley High School	Sumas, WA

Head coach

- Joddie Gleason (Chico State)

Assistant coach(es)

- Skip Gleason (Chico State)
- Dora Goles (Idaho State)
- Brynna Maxwell (Gonzaga)
- Jaela Eggers (George Fox)

Legend

- (C) Team captain
- (S) Suspended
- (I) Ineligible
- (W) Walk-on
- Injured
- Current redshirt

Roster
Last update: October 2, 2026

== Schedule and results ==
Date time, TV	Rank^{#}	Opponent^{#}	Result	Record	High points	High rebounds	High assists	Site (attendance) city, state
Exhibition
October 25, 2026*; 3:00 p.m.		Northwest	W 93–57		–	–	–	Reese Court; Cheney, WA
Regular season
November 3, 2026*; 5:00 p.m., ESPN+		at Utah	L 67–76	0–1	19 – Eggers	11 – Eggers	3 – Bowers	Jon M. Huntsman Center (1,754); Salt Lake City, UT
November 6, 2026*; 1:00 p.m., ESPN+		UC Davis	W 76–72	1–1	30 – Bowers	12 – Grossman	2 – Bowers	Reese Court (113); Cheney, WA
November 8, 2026*; 2:00 p.m., YouTube		at Oregon State	L 64–85	1–2	21 – Eggers	8 – Eggers	3 – Tied	Gill Coliseum (3,086); Corvallis, OR
November 13, 2026*; 12:00 p.m., ESPN+		Walla Walla	W 101–21	2–2	17 – Davis	6 – Tied	4 – Parrish	Reese Court (268); Cheney, WA
November 15, 2026*; 2:00 p.m.		UC Irvine						Reese Court; Cheney, WA
November 22, 2026 (Note: Non-conference game which is part of a home-and-home series that was established prior to Southern Utah's return to the Big Sky Conference.)*; 12:00 p.m.		at Southern Utah						America First Event Center; Cedar City, UT
November 24, 2026*; 6:00 p.m.		Whitworth						Reese Court; Cheney, WA
November 29, 2026*; 2:00 p.m.		Gonzaga						Reese Court; Cheney, WA
December 3, 2026; 6:00 p.m.		Portland State						Reese Court; Cheney, WA
December 5, 2026; 2:00 p.m.		Northern Colorado						Reese Court; Cheney, WA
December 8, 2026*; 6:00 p.m.		at Washington State						Beasley Coliseum; Pullman, WA
December 12, 2026*; 2:00 p.m.		at Cal Poly						Mott Athletics Center; San Luis Obispo, CA
December 18, 2026*; 7:00 a.m.		vs. Chicago State; Puerto Rico Clásico						Coliseo Guillermo Angulo; Carolina, PR
December 20, 2026*; 7:00 a.m.		vs. Cleveland State; Puerto Rico Clásico						Coliseo Guillermo Angulo; Carolina, PR
December 31, 2026; 5:30 p.m.		at Southern Utah						America First Event Center; Cedar City, UT
January 2, 2027; 12:00 p.m.		at Utah Tech						Burns Arena; St. George, UT
January 7, 2027; 5:00 p.m.		at Northern Arizona						Findlay Toyota Court; Flagstaff, AZ
January 14, 2027; 6:00 p.m.		Montana State						Reese Court; Cheney, WA
January 16, 2027; 2:00 p.m.		Montana						Reese Court; Cheney, WA
January 18, 2027; 6:00 p.m.		at Idaho State						Reed Gym; Pocatello, ID
January 23, 2027; 2:00 p.m.		Idaho						Reese Court; Cheney, WA
January 25, 2027; 5:00 p.m.		at Weber State						Dee Events Center; Ogden, UT
January 28, 2027; 10:00 a.m.		at Northern Colorado						Bank of Colorado Arena; Greeley, CO
January 30, 2027; 2:00 p.m.		at Portland State						Viking Pavilion; Portland, OR
February 4, 2027; 11:00 a.m.		Utah Tech						Reese Court; Cheney, WA
February 6, 2027; 2:00 p.m.		Southern Utah						Reese Court; Cheney, WA
February 11, 2027; 6:00 p.m.		at Montana						Dahlberg Arena; Missoula, MT
February 13, 2027; 1:00 p.m.		at Montana State						Worthington Arena; Bozeman, MT
February 20, 2027; 2:00 p.m.		Northern Arizona						Reese Court; Cheney, WA
February 22, 2027; 6:00 p.m.		Idaho State						Reese Court; Cheney, WA
February 27, 2027; 2:00 p.m.		at Idaho						ICCU Arena; Moscow, ID
March 1, 2027; 6:00 p.m.		Weber State						Reese Court; Cheney, WA
Big Sky tournament
March 5–10, 2027; TBA		vs.						Idaho Central Arena; Boise, ID
*Non-conference game. ^{#}Rankings from AP Poll. (#) Tournament seedings in parentheses. All times are in Pacific.
