= Sammy Doucette =

American basketball coach and former player

Current position
- Title: Head coach
- Team: Cal State Fullerton
- Conference: Big West
- Record: 0–0 (–)

Biographical details
- Born: July 25, 1993 (age 33); Santa Ana, California

Playing career
- 2012–2016: Vanguard

Coaching career (HC unless noted)
- 2016–2017: Concordia Irvine (GA)
- 2017–2018: Hope International (assistant)
- 2018–2019: Costa Mesa HS (CA)
- 2019–2026: Orange Coast
- 2026–present: Cal State Fullerton

Head coaching record
- Overall: 0–0 (–) (college); 131–42 (.757) (junior college); 16–14 (.533) (high school)

Accomplishments and honors

Championships
- 2 CCCAA (2023, 2024); 3 OEC (2023–2025)

Samantha Nicole Doucette (born July 25, 1993) is an American basketball coach and former player who is currently the head coach of the California State University, Fullerton women's basketball team.

== Coaching career ==
Doucette played college basketball at Vanguard University before turning to coaching, beginning as a graduate assistant at Concordia University Irvine and as an assistant at Hope International University. Doucette coached high school basketball at Costa Mesa High School for a season before she was hired to be the head coach at Orange Coast College. At Orange Coast, Doucette was credited with rebuilding a program that had won two games and had two returning players into a program that won two California Community College Athletic Association (CCCAA) championships and was considered a consistent CCCAA playoff contender.

Doucette was named the head coach at Cal State Fullerton on May 4, 2026.

== Head coaching record ==
=== College ===
Record table
Season	Team	Overall	Conference	Standing	Postseason
Cal State Fullerton Titans (Big West Conference) (2026–present)
2026–27	Cal State Fullerton	0–0	0–0		
Cal State Fullerton:		0–0 (–)	0–0 (–)		
Total:		0–0 (–)			

=== Junior college ===
Record table
Season	Team	Overall	Conference	Standing	Postseason
Orange Coast Pirates (Orange Empire Conference) (2019–2026)
2019–20	Orange Coast	2–14	0–3	8th	
2021–22	Orange Coast	20–9	9–3	2nd	CCCAA Regional Playoffs
2022–23	Orange Coast	32–1	13–1	1st	CCCAA Champion
2023–24	Orange Coast	30–3	14–0	1st	CCCAA Champion
2024–25	Orange Coast	27–6	10–2	1st	CCCAA Runner-Up
2025–26	Orange Coast	20–9	8–4	2nd	CCCAA Regional Playoffs
Orange Coast:		131–42 (.757)	54–13 (.806)		
Total:		131–42 (.757)			
National champion Postseason invitational champion Conference regular season champion Conference regular season and conference tournament champion Division regular season champion Division regular season and conference tournament champion Conference tournament champion
