= Aaron Kallhoff =

American basketball coach

Current position
- Title: Head coach
- Team: Sacramento State
- Conference: Big West
- Record: 36–61 (.371)

Playing career
- 1999–2000: Iowa Central
- 2000–2001: Northeast Nebraska
- 2001–2003: Bemidji State

Coaching career (HC unless noted)

Men's basketball
- 2003–2006: Allen County (assistant)
- 2006–2007: Seward County (assistant)

Women's basketball
- 2007–2008: Allen County
- 2008–2012: Hill College
- 2012–2013: Trinity Valley
- 2013–2015: Arkansas State (assistant)
- 2015–2018: TCU (assistant)
- 2018–2021: LSU (assistant)
- 2021–2022: Penn State (assistant)
- 2022–2023: BYU (assistant)
- 2023–present: Sacramento State

Head coaching record
- Overall: 36–61 (.371)

Aaron Kallhoff is an American basketball coach who is the current head coach of the Sacramento State Hornets women's basketball team.

== Career ==
On April 17, 2023, Kallhoff was hired as head coach at Sacramento State, the seventh in program history.

== Head coaching record ==
Record table
Season	Team	Overall	Conference	Standing	Postseason
Sacramento State Hornets (Big Sky) (2023–2026)
2023–24	Sacramento State	6–25	4–14	T-8th	
2024–25	Sacramento State	15–18	7–11	T-7th	
2025–26	Sacramento State	15–18	8–10	5th	
Sacramento State:		36–61 (.371)	19–35 (.352)		
Total:		36–61 (.371)			
National champion Postseason invitational champion Conference regular season champion Conference regular season and conference tournament champion Division regular season champion Division regular season and conference tournament champion Conference tournament champion
