= Sacramento State Hornets women's basketball =

American college basketball team

Sacramento State Hornets
2026–27 Sacramento State Hornets women's basketball team
- University: California State University, Sacramento
- Head coach: Aaron Kallhoff (3rd season)
- Location: Sacramento, California
- Arena: Hornet Pavilion (capacity: 3,000)
- Conference: Big West
- Nickname: Hornets
- Colors: Green and gold

NCAA Division I tournament appearances
- 2023

Conference tournament champions
- 2023

Conference regular-season champions
- 2023

Uniforms
Home	Away

The Sacramento State Hornets women's basketball team is the basketball team that represent California State University, Sacramento in Sacramento, California. The school's team currently competes in the Big West Conference.

== History ==
Sacramento State began play in 1976. They joined Division I in 1991. They played in the North Central Intercollegiate Athletic Conference (NCIAC) for their first season before playing in the GSC from 1977 to 1981. They joined the NCAC in 1981, playing until 1985 before becoming an Independent. They joined the American West Conference in 1994. They joined the Big Sky Conference in 1996. The first postseason appearance for the Hornets was the 2015 Women's National Invitation Tournament, where they made the Third Round. The 2022–23 season saw the program set multiple records: the first time they won over twenty games in a season and the first time they won the regular season Big Sky title, doing so by going 13–5 (tying a program record for best conference record) for a three way tie. In the Big Sky Tournament, they beat Idaho and Portland State to reach their first ever Big Sky final. They beat Northern Arizona on March 8 by a score of 76–63 to win their first conference tournament and reach the NCAA tournament.

== Postseason ==
=== NCAA Division I Tournament results ===
The Hornets have appeared in the NCAA Division I Tournament once. Their record is 0–1.

Year	Seed	Round	Opponent	Result
2023	13	First Round	(4) UCLA	L 45–67

=== WNIT results ===
The Hornets have appeared in the Women's National Invitation Tournament once. Their record is 2–1.

Year	Round	Opponent	Result
2015	First Round; Second Round; Third Round	Pacific; Eastern Washington; Saint Mary's	W 83–79; W 84–49; L 69–77
