= Heidi VanDerveer =

American basketball coach (born 1964)

Current position
- Title: Head coach
- Team: UC San Diego
- Conference: Big West
- Record: 275–139 (.664)

Biographical details
- Born: February 11, 1964 (age 62); Chautauqua, New York

Playing career
- 1982–1986: College of Charleston

Coaching career (HC unless noted)
- 1986–1988: Tennessee (asst.)
- 1988–1994: South Carolina (asst.)
- 1994–1997: Eastern Washington
- 1997: Sacramento Monarchs (asst.)
- 1997–1998: Sacramento Monarchs
- 1999–2002: Minnesota Lynx (asst.)
- 2002: Minnesota Lynx
- 2003–2004: Stanford (video coord.)
- 2004–2005: San Francisco (asst.)
- 2006–2007: Seattle Storm (asst.)
- 2007–2008: San Diego State (assoc. HC)
- 2008–2012: Occidental
- 2012–present: UC San Diego

Head coaching record
- Overall: 384–219 (college); 17–39 (WNBA)
- Tournaments: 3–4 (NCAA Division II); 0–2 (NCAA Division III); 0–2 (NCAA Division I)

Accomplishments and honors

Championships
- 1× Big West regular season (2026); 2× Big West tournament (2025, 2026); 3× CCAA Tournament (2013, 2019, 2020); 5× CCAA regular season (2016–20); 2× SCIAC Tournament (2009, 2011); 4× SCIAC regular season (2009–12)

Awards
- 4× CCAA Coach of the Year (2016–19); WBCA Division II District/Region Coach of the Year (2019)

Heidi Elizabeth VanDerveer (born February 11, 1964) is a women's basketball collegiate and professional coach. She is currently the women's basketball head coach at UC San Diego.

A native of Chautauqua, New York, VanDerveer was a four-year letter-winner in basketball at the College of Charleston, serving as team captain as a senior and graduating with a bachelor's degree in political science and English in 1986. She also has a master's degree in physical education and sports psychology from the University of Tennessee.

VanDerveer began her coaching career as a graduate assistant at Tennessee under Pat Summitt, where she helped guide the Volunteers to the 1987 NCAA National Championship and the Final Four in 1988. She then served as an assistant at South Carolina for six seasons under her college coach Nancy Wilson, qualifying the NCAA Tournament three times, including a Sweet 16 run in 1990. VanDerveer took the head coaching role at Eastern Washington in 1994.

VanDerveer made the jump to the WNBA in 1997, joining the staff of the Sacramento Monarchs. She was elevated to head coach in the middle of the season after the firing of Mary Murphy and served in that role the following year. She became an assistant for the Minnesota Lynx in 1999, and took over as head coach after the resignation of Brian Agler in 2002.

VanDerveer came back to the college ranks and was the video coordinator at Stanford for one season, helping the team reach the Elite 8. She worked as an assistant at San Francisco for the 2004–05 season. She had to briefly serve as the acting head coach at San Francisco after Mary Hile-Nepfel was unable to perform her day-to-day duties due to medical restrictions. She returned to the WNBA in 2006 as an assistant with the Seattle Storm, before serving as the associate head coach at San Diego State for Beth Burns.

In 2008, she became the head coach at Occidental College. In her four years at Oxy, she led the Tigers to a SCIAC regular season title every year and won the conference tournament twice.

In 2012, VanDerveer was named the head coach of the UC San Diego women's basketball team. VanDerveer led the Tritons to five CCAA regular season and three CCAA Tournament titles in eight seasons at the Division II level, and was named CCAA Coach of the Year four times.

Starting in 2020–21, UCSD transitioned to Division I status. In 2024–25, VanDerveer led UCSD to an NCAA Tournament berth in its first year of postseason eligibility at the Division I level, capturing the Big West Tournament title. In 2025–26, the Tritons won both the Big West regular season and Tournament championships.

She is the younger sister of Tara VanDerveer, who had been head coach of the Stanford women's basketball team for 38 seasons.

== Head coaching record ==
=== College ===
- UC San Diego
- Big West

Record table
Season	Team	Overall	Conference	Standing	Postseason
Eastern Washington Eagles (Big Sky Conference) (1994–1997)
1994–95	Eastern Washington	12–15	8–6	4th	
1995–96	Eastern Washington	7–20	5–9	6th	
1996–97	Eastern Washington	5–21	2–14	T–8th	
Eastern Washington:		24–55 (.304)	15–29 (.341)		
Occidental Tigers (Southern California Intercollegiate Athletic Conference) (2008–2012)
2008–09	Occidental	22–6	12–2	1st	NCAA Division III First Round
2009–10	Occidental	21–6	12–2	T–1st	
2010–11	Occidental	19–9	12–2	1st	NCAA Division III First Round
2011–12	Occidental	22–4	13–1	1st	
Occidental:		84–25 (.771)	49–7 (.875)		
UC San Diego Tritons (California Collegiate Athletic Association) (2012–2020)
2012–13	UC San Diego	22–11	17–5	2nd	NCAA Division II First Round
2013–14	UC San Diego	16–11	13–9	T–3rd	
2014–15	UC San Diego	18–10	16–6	4th	
2015–16	UC San Diego	26–5	18–2	T–1st	NCAA Division II Third Round
2016–17	UC San Diego	23–7	17–3	1st	NCAA Division II First Round
2017–18	UC San Diego	28–5	21–1	1st	NCAA Division II Second Round
2018–19	UC San Diego	30–1	22–0	1st	NCAA Division II Second Round
2019–20	UC San Diego	25–5	18–4	T–1st	Postseason not held
UC San Diego Tritons (Big West Conference) (2020–present)
2020–21	UC San Diego	6–9	6–9	8th	
2021–22	UC San Diego	13–14	10–8	5th	
2022–23	UC San Diego	13–17	10–10	6th	
2023–24	UC San Diego	12–19	8–12	T-7th	
2024–25	UC San Diego	20–16	13–7	T–3rd	NCAA Division I First Four
2025–26	UC San Diego	24–9	17–3	T–1st	NCAA Division I First Round
UC San Diego:		276–139 (.665)	227–80 (.739)		
Total:		384–219 (.637)			
National champion Postseason invitational champion Conference regular season champion Conference regular season and conference tournament champion Division regular season champion Division regular season and conference tournament champion Conference tournament champion

=== WNBA ===
Legend
Regular season	G	Games coached	W	Games won	L	Games lost	W–L %	Win–loss %
Playoffs	PG	Playoff games	PW	Playoff wins	PL	Playoff losses	PW–L %	Playoff win–loss %

Team	Year	G	W	L	W–L%	Finish	PG	PW	PL	PW–L%	Result
Sacramento*	1997	13	5	8	.385	3rd in Western	—	—	—	–	
Sacramento	1998	30	8	22	.267	4th in Western	—	—	—	–	
Minnesota**	2002	13	4	9	.308	8th in Western	—	—	—	–	
Career		56	17	39	.304		—	—	—	–	

* VanDerveer took over as interim head coach after Mary Murphy was fired with a 5–10 record. Sacramento's total record in 1997 was 10–18.
** VanDerveer took over as interim head coach after Brian Agler was fired with a 6–13 record. Minnesota's total record in 2002 was 10–22.
