= Titan Gym =

California stadium

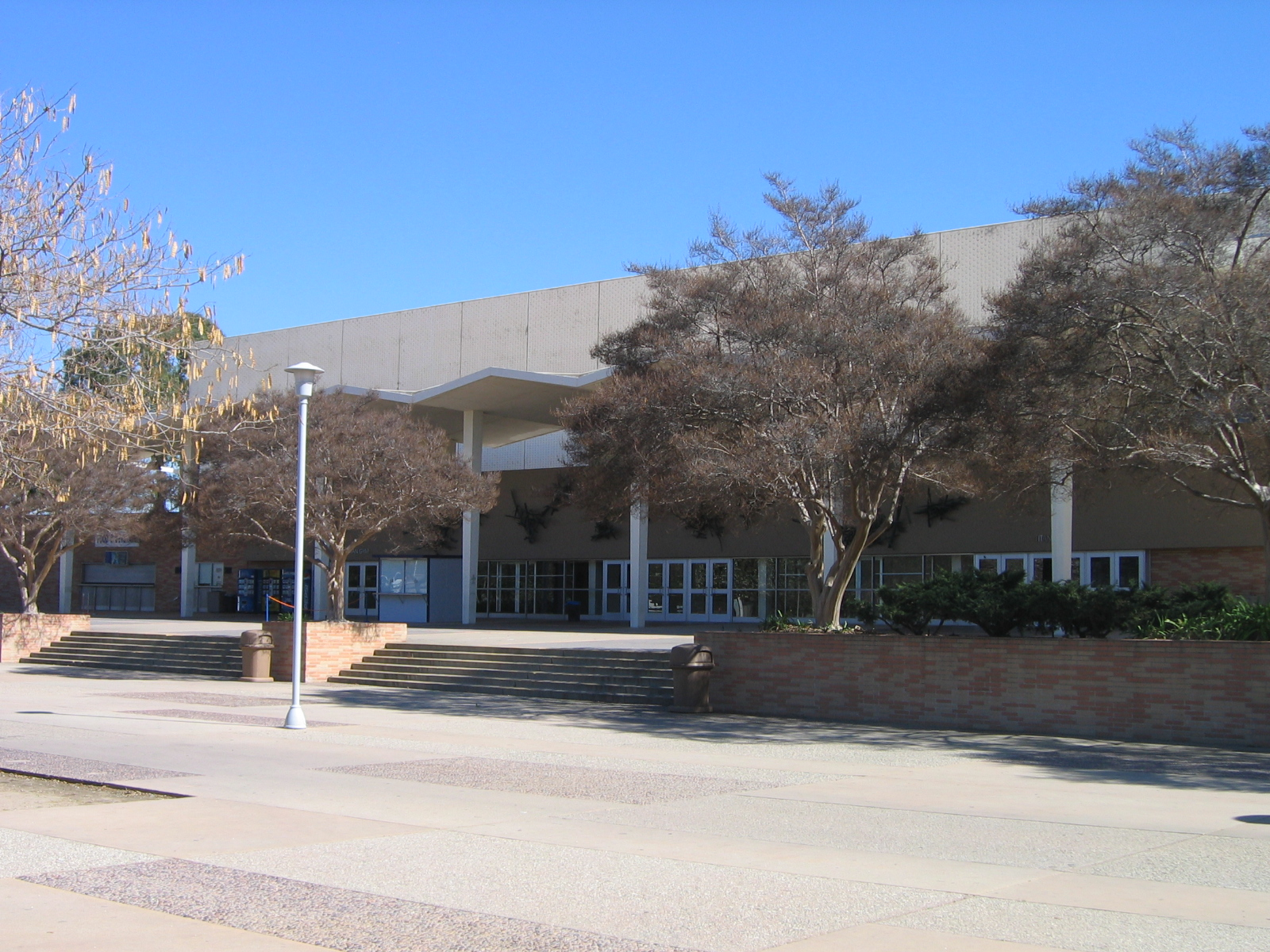
- Exterior of Titan Gym
- Interactive map of Titan Gym
- Full name: Titan Gym
- Location: 800 North State College Blvd. Fullerton, CA 92834
- Coordinates: 33.883046°N 117.886090°W
- Owner: California State University, Fullerton
- Operator: California State University, Fullerton
- Capacity: 4,000
- Surface: Hardwood
- Record attendance: 5,015

Construction
- Built: 1964
- Renovated: 2004
- Expanded: 2005

Tenants
- Cal State Fullerton Titans men's basketball Cal State Fullerton Titans women's basketball Cal State Fullerton Titans women's volleyball

Titan Gym is a 4,000-seat, indoor multi-purpose stadium on the campus of California State University, Fullerton in Fullerton, California.

== History and renovations ==
Titan Gym was built in 1964. Twenty years later, the gym hosted handball competitions for the 1984 Summer Olympics. Ronald Reagan spoke on behalf of the Bush/Quayle campaign in 1988, his last Orange County appearance as President of the United States.

In order to combat wear and tear on Titan Gym, there have been a number of improvements made. Bleachers, which were used to seat the attendees, have been replaced with chair-back seats. The floor was completely redesigned and resurfaced. A new scoreboard was unveiled before the 2003 season and additional balcony seating was added before the start of the 2004 season.

For the CSUF athletes, Titan Gym is also the home practice facility for the basketball and volleyball programs.

The 2018 U.S. Open, a stop on the 2018 Badminton World Federation Tour, was held at the gym.

Future renovation plans include an expansion of the Titan Gym entrance to include a Titans Hall of Fame as well as a reception area for social functions.

== Tenants ==
Currently, the intercollegiate men's basketball, women's basketball and women's volleyball teams call Titan Gym home. The men's basketball team has played every season at Titan Gym since its opening in 1964.

== Gallery ==
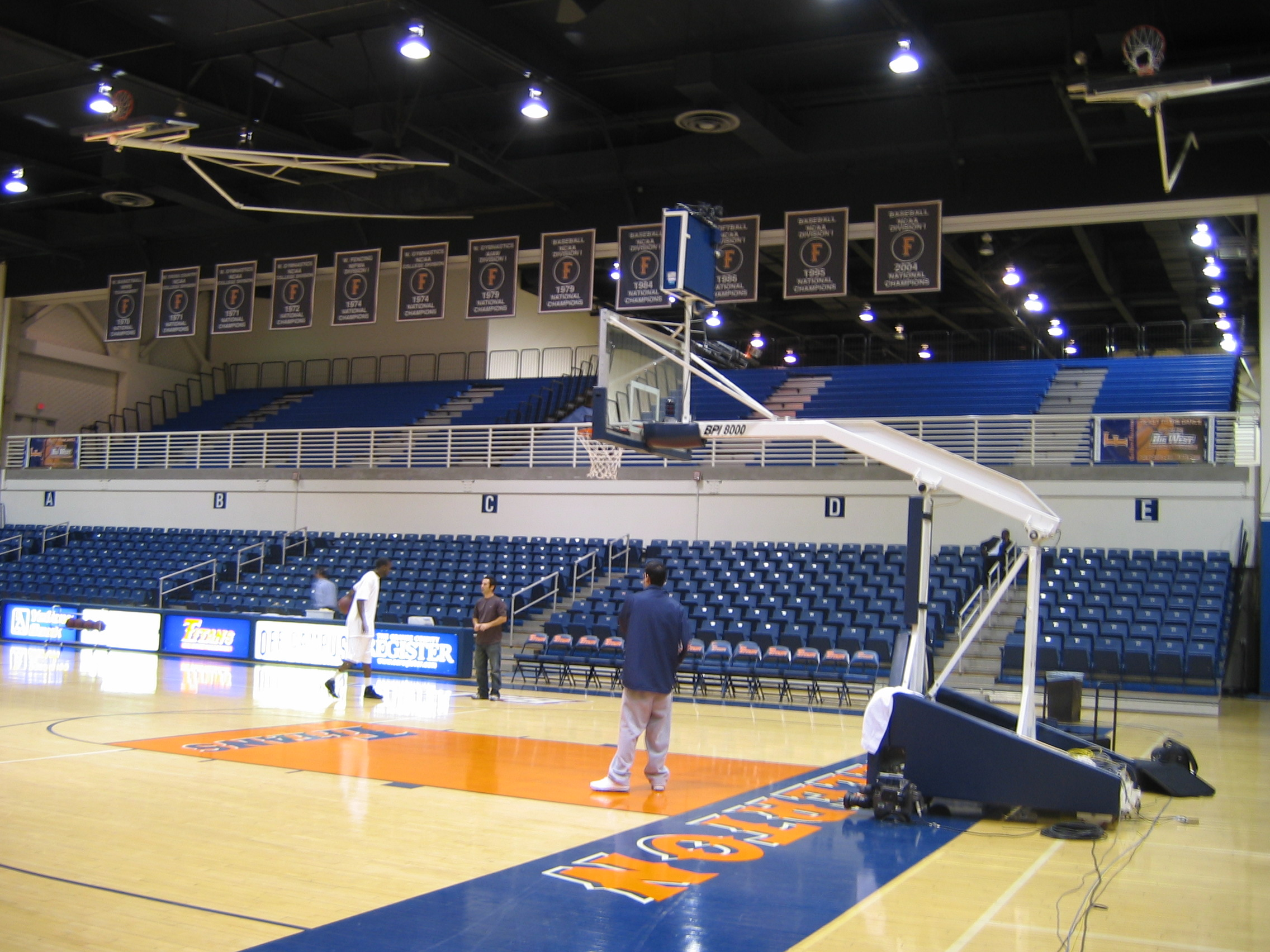
Inside of Titan Gym

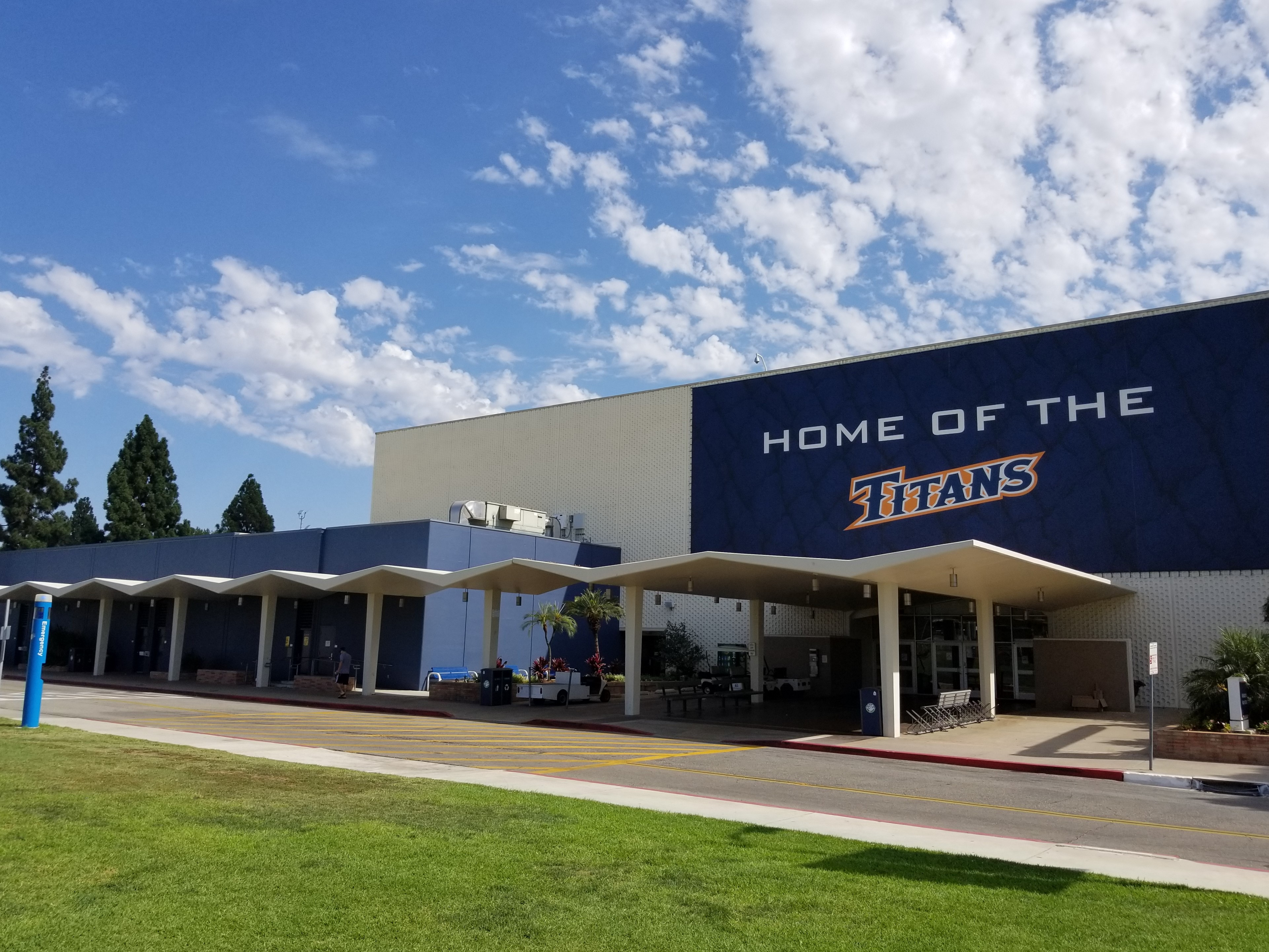
Titan Gym

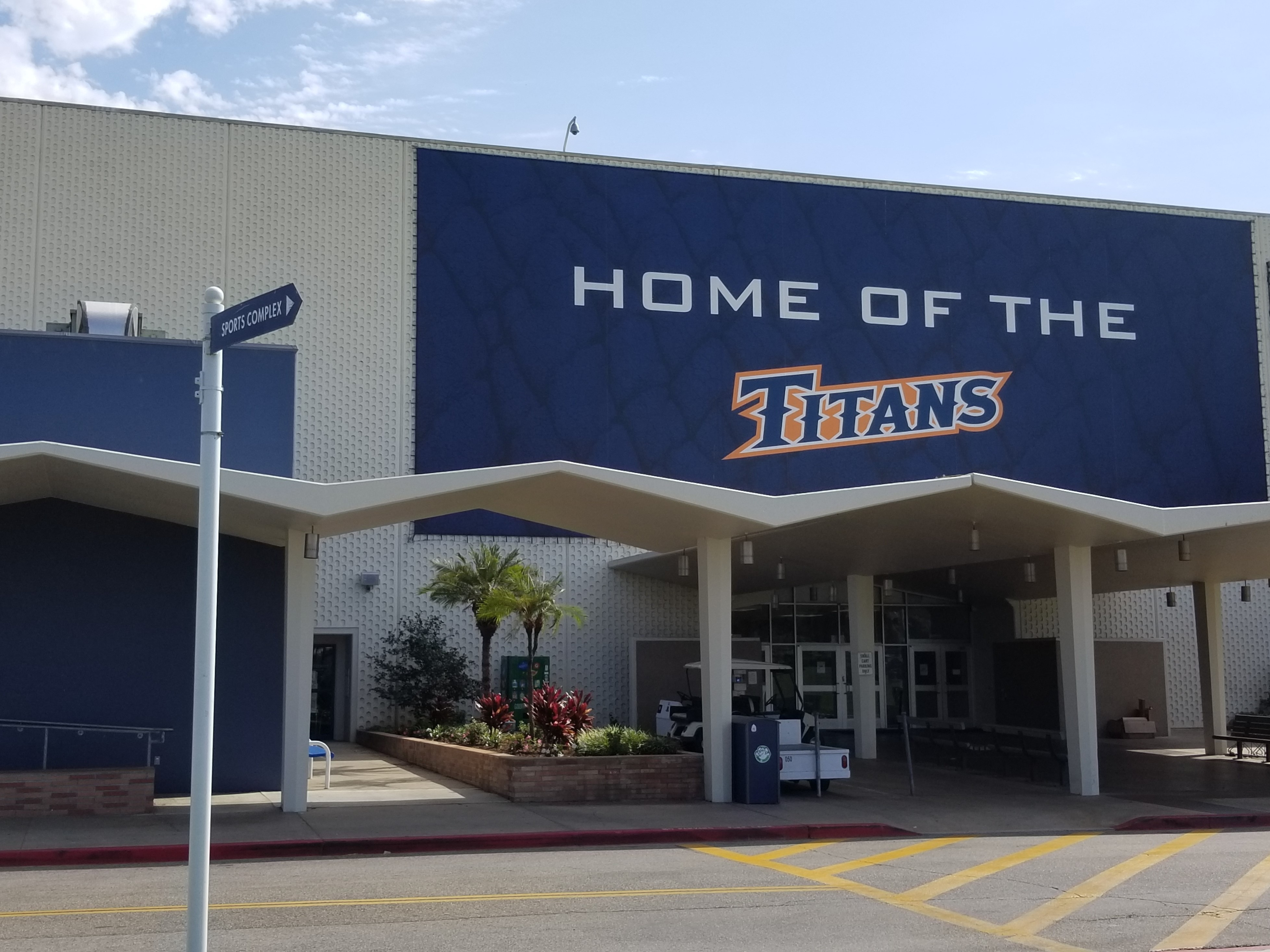
Titan Gym entrance

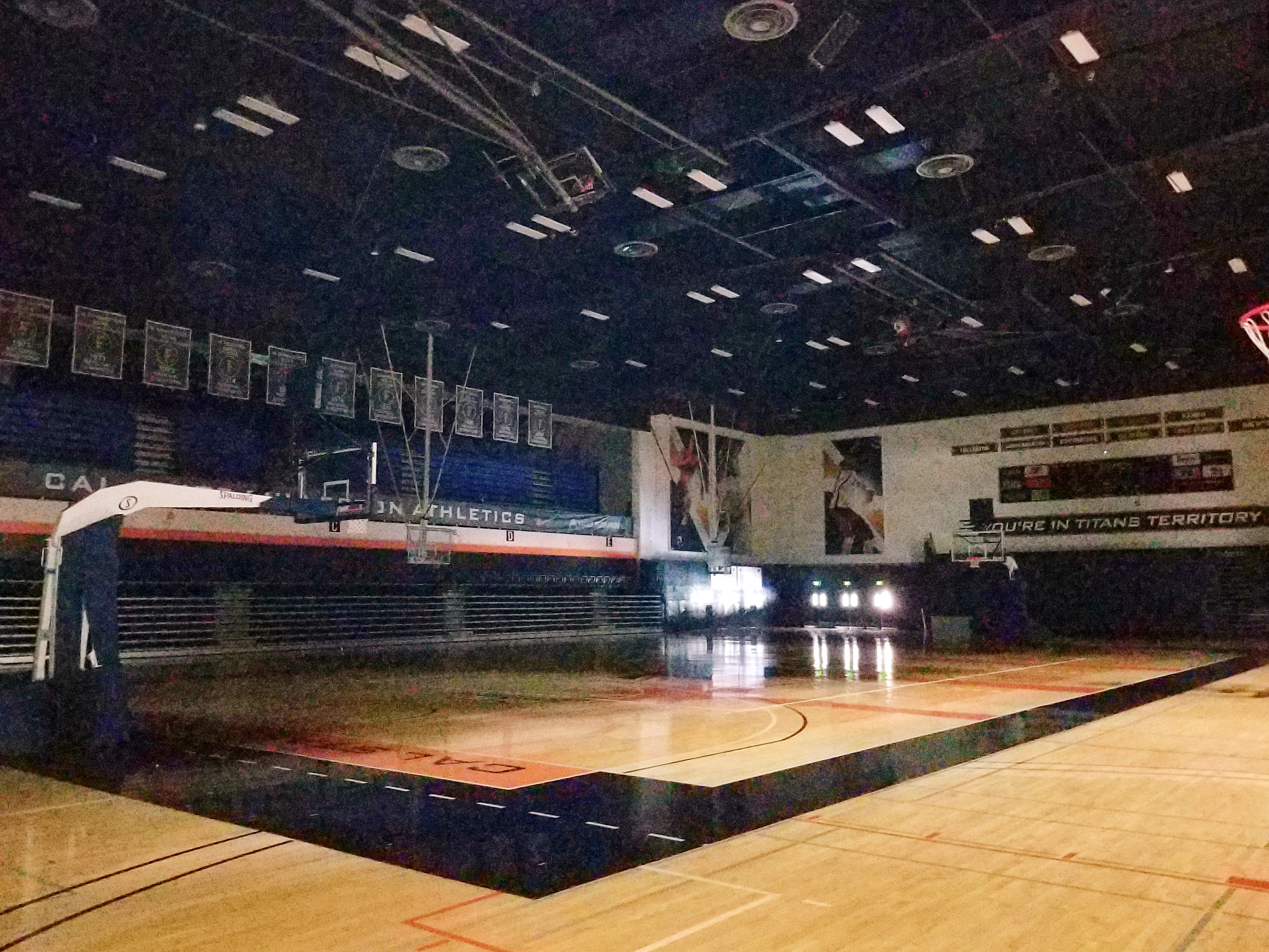
Titan Gym court

== See also ==
- List of NCAA Division I basketball arenas
