= UC San Diego Tritons women's basketball =

American women's college basketball team

2026–27 UC San Diego Tritons women's basketball team
- University: University of California, San Diego
- First season: 1971; 55 years ago
- Head coach: Heidi VanDerveer (15th season)
- Location: La Jolla, California
- Arena: LionTree Arena (capacity: 4,000)
- Conference: Big West Conference (WCC in 2027–28)
- Nickname: Tritons
- Colors: Blue and gold

NCAA Division I tournament Final Four
- Division II: 2007
Other NCAA Division I tournament results
Elite Eight	Division II: 2007
Sweet Sixteen	Division II: 2007, 2012, 2016
Appearances	Division I: 2025, 2026; Division II: 2004, 2006, 2007, 2008, 2009, 2010, 2012, 2013, 2016, 2017, 2018, 2019; Division III: 1995, 1996, 1997, 1998, 2000

Conference tournament champions
- CCAA: 2013, 2019, 2020; Big West: 2025, 2026

Conference regular-season champions
- 2026

For information on all UC San Diego sports, see UC San Diego Tritons

The UC San Diego Tritons women's basketball team is the women's college basketball program that represents the University of California, San Diego. The Tritons compete in NCAA Division I as a member of the Big West Conference (BWC). The team plays its home games at LionTree Arena.

== Postseason appearances ==
=== NCAA Division I ===
The Tritons have made two appearances in the NCAA Division I women's basketball tournament. Their record is 0–2.

Year	Seed	Round	Opponent	Result
2025	#16	First Four	#16 Southern	L 56–68
2026	#14	First Round	#3 TCU	L 40–86

=== NCAA Division II ===
The Tritons made 12 appearances in the NCAA Division II women's basketball tournament. They had a combined record of 12–12.

Year	Round	Opponent	Result
2004	First round	Seattle Pacific	L 59–79
2006	First round	Seattle Pacific	L 57–62
2007	First round Regional semifinals Regional finals Elite Eight; Final Four	Western Washington; Alaska Anchorage; Chico State; Glenville State; Southern Connecticut	W 78–45; W 66–51; W 80–63; W 71–61; L 53–67
2008	First round Regional semifinals	Cal State San Bernardino; Seattle Pacific	W 59–46; L 67–76
2009	First round Regional semifinals	Cal State Dominguez Hills; Alaska Anchorage	W 65–66; L 49–52
2010	First round	Humboldt State	L 72–76
2012	First round Regional semifinals Regional finals	Chico State; Western Washington; Alaska Anchorage	W 84–66; W 81–66; L 63–68
2013	First round	Grand Canyon	L 57–68
2016	First round Regional semifinals Regional finals	Cal State East Bay; Azusa Pacific; Alaska Anchorage	W 74–59; W 87–77; L 57–72
2017	First round	Simon Fraser	L 65–69
2018	First round Regional semifinals	Seattle Pacific; Montana State Billings	W 64–51; L 73–75
2019	First round Regional semifinals	Dominican (CA); Azusa Pacific	W 81–58; L 61–64
