= 2026–27 Nevada Wolf Pack women's basketball team =

American collegiate basketball season

2026–27 Nevada Wolf Pack women's basketball
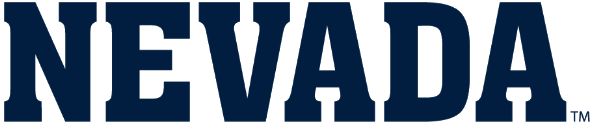
- Conference: Mountain West Conference
- Record: 0–2 (0–0 MW)
- Head coach: Kelly Sopak (1st season)
- Assistant coaches: Najé Murray; Jesse Clark; Tyler Ellis; Brittany Aikens; Lavaris Duncan
- Home arena: Lawlor Events Center

2026–27 Mountain West Conference women's basketball standings
	Conf.				Overall
Team	W		L	PCT	W		L	PCT
Air Force	0	–	0	–	2	–	0	1.000
UTEP	0	–	0	–	2	–	0	1.000
Grand Canyon	0	–	0	–	1	–	0	1.000
New Mexico	0	–	0	–	1	–	1	.500
UNLV	0	–	0	–	1	–	1	.500
UC Davis	0	–	0	–	1	–	2	.333
San Jose State	0	–	0	–	0	–	1	.000
Hawai'i	0	–	0	–	0	–	2	.000
Nevada	0	–	0	–	0	–	2	.000
Wyoming	0	–	0	–	0	–	2	.000
† 2027 Mountain West tournament winner As of November 10, 2026

The 2026–27 Nevada Wolf Pack women's basketball team represents the University of Nevada, Reno during the 2026–27 NCAA Division I women's basketball season. The Wolf Pack, led by first-year head coach Kelly Sopak, play their home games at the Lawlor Events Center in Reno, Nevada, as members of the Mountain West Conference.

== Previous season ==
The Wolf Pack finished the 2025–26 season 10–21, 6–14 in Mountain West play to finish in tenth place. They were defeated by Boise State in the first round of the Mountain West tournament.

Nevada announced on March 9, 2026 that Levins will not return after nine seasons as head coach. Sopak, an alum of Nevada who was serving as head coach at Carondelet High School in Concord, California, was hired by the Wolf Pack on March 24.

== Offseason ==
=== Departures ===
Nevada departures
Name	Num	Pos.	Height	Year	Hometown	Reason for departure
Tahj-Monet Bloom	0	F	6'2"	(redshirt) Freshman	Okinawa, Japan	Transferred to Maryland Eastern Shore
Ahrray Young	1	G	5'11"	(redshirt) Junior	Sacramento, CA	Transferred to UC Irvine
Chloe Williams	10	F	6'3"	Senior	Los Angeles, CA	Graduated
Cheyenne McEvans	12	G	5'9"	Graduate Student	Detroit, MI	Graduated
Maia Rosarion	14	F	5'10"	Sophomore	Vancouver, BC	Transferred to UNLV
Makayla Carter	23	F	6'2"	Freshman	Tucson, AZ	Transferred to Tulane
Skylar Durley	24	G	5'9"	Freshman	Oklahoma City, OK	Transferred to Penn State

=== Incoming transfers ===
Nevada incoming transfers
Name	Num	Pos.	Height	Year	Hometown	Previous school
Sierra Chambers	5	G	5'8"	Junior	Danville, CA	Southern Utah
Mahaila Harrison	7	G	6'0"	(redshirt) Junior	Vancouver, WA	Alaska Anchorage
Alexis Swillis	10	C	6'3"	(redshirt) Freshman	Fresno, CA	UNLV
Aili Tanke	32	G	5'11"	Junior	Johnston, IA	Iowa State

=== Recruiting class ===
There was no 2026 recruiting class.

==== 2027 recruiting class ====
College recruiting (2027)
Name	Hometown	School	Height	Weight	Commit date
Love Forde; F	Happy Valley, OR	DME Academy	6 ft 2 in (1.88 m)	N/A	
Love Forde; F	Recruit ratings: ESPN: (91)				
Overall recruit ranking:
Note: In many cases, Scout, Rivals, 247Sports, On3, and ESPN may conflict in their listings of height and weight.; In these cases, the average was taken. ESPN grades are on a 100-point scale.; Sources: "2027 Player Commits". ESPN. Archived from the original on August 30, 2026.

== Roster ==
2026–27 Nevada Wolf Pack women's basketball team
Players
Coaches

Pos.	#	Name	Height	Year	Previous school	Hometown
G	2	Izzy Sullivan	5 ft 10 in (1.78 m)	Sr	Eastside Catholic School	Sammamish, Washington
F	3	Imbie Jones	6 ft 2 in (1.88 m)	Sr	Wisconsin	Seattle, Washington
G	4	Gabby Ramos	5 ft 10 in (1.78 m)	So	Clovis East High School	Clovis, California
G	5	Sierra Chambers	5 ft 8 in (1.73 m)	Jr	Southern Utah	Danville, California
G	6	Taua Puloka	5 ft 9 in (1.75 m)	Fr	Reed High School	Sparks, Nevada
G	7	Mahaila Harrison	6 ft 0 in (1.83 m)	RS Jr	Alaska Anchorage	Vancouver, Washington
F	8	Olivia Poulivaati	6 ft 0 in (1.83 m)	RS Jr	Tualatin High School	Tualatin, Oregon
G	9	Hanna Jolinder	6 ft 0 in (1.83 m)	So	Alvik Basketball Club	Stockholm, Sweden
C	10	Alexis Swillis	6 ft 3 in (1.91 m)	RS Fr	UNLV	Fresno, California
PG	11	Britain Backus	5 ft 7 in (1.7 m)	So	Albert M. Lowry High School	Winnemucca, Nevada
F	13	Amelia Raidaveta	6 ft 2 in (1.88 m)	RS Sr	Weber State	Dubbo, Australia
G	22	Dyllyn Howell	5 ft 11 in (1.8 m)	Fr	South Medford High School	Medford, Oregon
G	24	Skylar Durley	5 ft 9 in (1.75 m)	Fr	Edmond North High School	Oklahoma City, Oklahoma
G	25	Delaney Arredondo	5 ft 5 in (1.65 m)	Fr	Judson High School	Laredo, Texas
G	32	Aili Tanke	5 ft 11 in (1.8 m)	Jr	Iowa State	Johnston, IA
F	34	Kendra Hicks	6 ft 1 in (1.85 m)	Jr	Jesuit High School	Portland, Oregon
G	35	Elle Motherway	5 ft 11 in (1.8 m)	Sr	Bishop Manogue High School	Reno, Nevada

Head coach

- Kelly Sopak (Nevada)

Assistant coach(es)

- Najé Murray (Syracuse)
- Jesse Clark (Pacific Union)
- Tyler Ellis (New Mexico State)
- Brittany Aikens (Fresno State)
- Lavaris Duncan (Angelo State)

Legend

- (C) Team captain
- (S) Suspended
- (I) Ineligible
- (W) Walk-on
- Injured
- Current redshirt

Roster
Last update: January 19, 2026

== Schedule and results ==
Date time, TV	Rank^{#}	Opponent^{#}	Result	Record	High points	High rebounds	High assists	Site (attendance) city, state
Non-conference regular season
November 2, 2026*; 6:00 p.m., ESPN+		at Loyola Marymount	L 64-89	0-1	18 – Tanke	6 – Tied	4 – Arredondo	Gersten Pavilion (677); Los Angeles, CA
November 7, 2026*; 6:00 p.m., MW+		Sacramento State	L 60-70	0-2	16 – Harrison	7 – Tanke	2 – Tied	Lawlor Events Center (1,832); Reno, NV
November 10, 2026*; 6:00 p.m., MW+		Jessup						Lawlor Events Center; Reno, NV
November 14, 2026*; 1:00 p.m., ESPN+		at Utah Valley						UCCU Center; Orem, UT
November 17, 2026*; 11:00 a.m., MW+		Pepperdine						Lawlor Events Center; Reno, NV
November 20, 2026*; 6:00 p.m., MW+		Idaho						Lawlor Events Center; Reno, NV
November 27, 2026*; 6:00 p.m., MW+		New Mexico State; Nugget Classic						Lawlor Events Center; Reno, NV
November 29, 2026*; 1:00 p.m., MW+		Troy; Nugget Classic						Lawlor Events Center; Reno, NV
December 1, 2026*; 6:00 p.m., MW+		Washington State						Lawlor Events Center; Reno, NV
December 6, 2026*; 12:00 p.m., YouTube		at Texas State						Strahan Arena; San Marcos, TX
December 9, 2026*; 5:00 p.m., ESPN+		at Denver						Hamilton Gymnasium; Denver, CO
December 12, 2026*; 1:00 p.m., MW+		Saint Mary's						Lawlor Events Center; Reno, NV
December 18, 2026*; 5:00 p.m., ESPN+		at Pacific						Alex G. Spanos Center; Stockton, CA
December 22, 2026*; 2:00 p.m., MW+		Loyola Marymount						Lawlor Events Center; Reno, NV
Mountain West regular season
December 30, 2026; 8:00 p.m., MW+		at Hawaii						Stan Sheriff Center; Honolulu, HI
January 2, 2027; 1:00 p.m., MW+		Wyoming						Lawlor Events Center; Reno, NV
January 6, 2027; 6:00 p.m., MW+		Air Force						Lawlor Events Center; Reno, NV
January 9, 2027; 7:00 p.m., MW+		at New Mexico						The Pit; Albuquerque, NM
January 13, 2027; 6:00 p.m., MW+		San Jose State						Lawlor Events Center; Reno, NV
January 16, 2027; 1:00 p.m., MW+		at UTEP						Don Haskins Center; El Paso, TX
January 20, 2027; 5:30 p.m., MW+		at Air Force						Clune Arena; Colorado Springs, CO
January 24, 2027; 1:00 p.m., The CW		UNLV						Lawlor Events Center; Reno, NV
January 27, 2027; 6:00 p.m., MW+		Grand Canyon						Lawlor Events Center; Reno, NV
January 30, 2027; 1:00 p.m., MW+		UTEP						Lawlor Events Center; Reno, NV
February 3, 2027; 5:30 p.m., MW+		at Wyoming						Arena-Auditorium; Laramie, WY
February 6, 2027; 2:00 p.m., MW+		at San Jose State						Provident Credit Union Event Center; San Jose, CA
February 13, 2027; 2:00 p.m., MW+		UC Davis						Lawlor Events Center; Reno, NV
February 17, 2027; 5:00 p.m., MW+		at Grand Canyon						Global Credit Union Arena; Phoenix, AZ
February 20, 2027; 2:00 p.m., MW+		Hawaii						Lawlor Events Center; Reno, NV
February 24, 2027; 6:00 p.m., MW+		New Mexico						Lawlor Events Center; Reno, NV
February 27, 2027; 2:00 p.m., ESPN Unlimited		at UNLV						Cox Pavilion; Paradise, NV
March 2, 2027; 6:00 p.m., MW+		at UC Davis						University Credit Union Center; Davis, CA
Mountain West tournament
March 7–10, 2027; TBA		vs.						Thomas & Mack Center; Paradise, NV
*Non-conference game. ^{#}Rankings from AP Poll. (#) Tournament seedings in parentheses. All times are in Pacific.
