= 2026–27 Weber State Wildcats women's basketball team =

American college basketball season

2026–27 Weber State Wildcats women's basketball
- Conference: Big Sky Conference
- Record: 0–0 (0–0 Big Sky)
- Head coach: Jenteal Jackson (4th season)
- Associate head coach: Nicole Yazzie
- Assistant coaches: Alli Winters; Felicity Jones
- Home arena: Dee Events Center

2026–27 Big Sky women's basketball standings
	Conf.				Overall
Team	W		L	PCT	W		L	PCT
Eastern Washington	0	–	0	–	0	–	0	–
Idaho	0	–	0	–	0	–	0	–
Idaho State	0	–	0	–	0	–	0	–
Montana	0	–	0	–	0	–	0	–
Montana State	0	–	0	–	0	–	0	–
Northern Arizona	0	–	0	–	0	–	0	–
Northern Colorado	0	–	0	–	0	–	0	–
Portland State	0	–	0	–	0	–	0	–
Southern Utah	0	–	0	–	0	–	0	–
Utah Tech	0	–	0	–	0	–	0	–
Weber State	0	–	0	–	0	–	0	–
† 2027 Big Sky tournament winner

The 2026–27 Weber State Wildcats women's basketball team will represent Weber State University during the 2026–27 NCAA Division I women's basketball season. The Wildcats, led by fourth-year head coach Jenteal Jackson, will play their home games at the Dee Events Center in Ogden, Utah, and compete as a member of the Big Sky Conference.

== Previous season ==
The Wildcats finished the 2025–26 season 11–22 overall and 4–14 in Big Sky play, finishing ninth in the conference. As the No. 9 seed in the Big Sky tournament, they defeated No. 10 Portland State 76–53 in the first round, before falling to top-seeded Idaho 52–66 to end their season.

== Offseason ==
=== Departures ===
Weber State departures
Name	Number	Pos.	Height	Year	Hometown	Reason for departure
Maya Davis	0	Guard/Forward	5'11"	Sophomore	Seattle, WA	Transferred to IUP (D-II)
Vanna Quintana	1	Guard	5'9"	Sophomore	Dinuba, CA	Transferred to Cal State Bakersfield
Alyssa Coombs	2	Guard	5'10"	Junior	Roy, UT	Walk-on; left team
Antoinette Emma-Nnopu	7	Forward	5'11"	Senior	Geelong, Australia	Graduated
Arizana Peaua	11	Guard/Forward	6'1"	Junior	Reno, NV	Left team
Fui Niumeitolu	12	Guard	5'9"	Sophomore	Sandy, UT	Transferred to Murray State College (NJCAA)
Makenna Shaffer-Lauer	13	Guard	6'1"	Junior	Greeley, CO	Transferred to Texas State
Japrix Stubbs	15	Guard	6'0"	Junior	Cedar City, UT	Left team
Lanae Billy	32	Guard	5'7"	Senior	Shiprock, NM	Graduated

=== Incoming transfers ===
Weber State incoming transfers
Name	Number	Pos.	Height	Year	Hometown	Previous school
Sienna Guttadauro	0	Guard	5'6"	Senior	San Jose, CA	UTSA
Draya Wacker	3	Guard	5'8"	Graduate Student	Melstone, MT	Montana
Grace Hintz	11	Guard	5'9"	Sophomore	Lynden, WA	Montana State
Favour Onoh	12	Center	6'5"	Junior	Enugu, Nigeria	Oklahoma State
Adria Lincoln	13	Guard	6'1"	Graduate Student	Monroe, WA	Montana
Sidney Anderson	35	Guard	5'9"	Sophomore	Tucson, AZ	Grand Canyon

=== Recruiting class ===
There was no 2026 recruiting class.

== Roster ==
2026–27 Weber State Wildcats women's basketball team
Players
Coaches

Pos.	#	Name	Height	Year	Previous school	Hometown
G	0	Sienna Guttadauro	5 ft 6 in (1.68 m)	Sr	Archbishop Mitty High School; UTSA	San Jose, CA
G	1	Berkley Hart	6 ft 0 in (1.83 m)	Fr	Alamo Heights High School	San Antonio, TX
G	3	Draya Wacker	5 ft 8 in (1.73 m)	GS	Melstone High School; Montana	Melstone, MT
G	4	Izabella Juarez	6 ft 0 in (1.83 m)	Fr	Bella Vista College Prep	Phoenix, AZ
G/F	5	Dakota Nap	6 ft 1 in (1.85 m)	Jr	Hazen High School	Renton, WA
G	8	Hannah Robbins	6 ft 0 in (1.83 m)	Sr	PHH Prep; Montana State	Phoenix, AZ
G/F	9	Celestine Segretain	6 ft 1 in (1.85 m)	Jr	Lycée Polyvalent Chevrollier; Eastern Arizona College	Angers, France
F	10	Paris Lauro	6 ft 0 in (1.83 m)	Sr	Highland Park High School; New Mexico	Dallas, TX
G	11	Grace Hintz	5 ft 9 in (1.75 m)	So	Lynden Christian High School; Montana State	Lynden, WA
C	12	Favour Onoh	6 ft 5 in (1.96 m)	Jr	Oklahoma State	Enugu, Nigeria
G	13	Adria Lincoln	6 ft 1 in (1.85 m)	GS	Monroe High School; Montana	Monroe, WA
G	22	Sydney White	5 ft 9 in (1.75 m)	Sr	Arapahoe High School; California Baptist	Orem, UT
F	25	Nicole Willardson	6 ft 4 in (1.93 m)	Sr	Richfield High School; Utah Tech	Richfield, UT
G	33	Sidney Anderson	5 ft 9 in (1.75 m)	So	Salpointe Catholic High School; Grand Canyon	Tucson, AZ

Head coach

- Jenteal Jackson (Westminster)

Assistant coach(es)

- Nicole Yazzie (Westminster)
- Alli Winters (Utah)
- Felicity Jones (Southern Idaho)

Legend

- (C) Team captain
- (S) Suspended
- (I) Ineligible
- (W) Walk-on
- Injured
- Current redshirt

Roster
Last update: October 13, 2026

== Schedule and results ==
Date time, TV	Rank^{#}	Opponent^{#}	Result	Record	High points	High rebounds	High assists	Site (attendance) city, state
Regular season
November 3, 2026*; 6:00 p.m., ESPN+		Westminster						Dee Events Center; Ogden, UT
November 7, 2026*; 4:00 p.m., ESPN+		Denver						Dee Events Center; Ogden, UT
November 14, 2026*; 1:00 p.m., ESPN+		Houston Christian						Dee Events Center; Ogden, UT
November 16, 2026*; 6:00 p.m., ESPN+		Northern New Mexico						Dee Events Center; Ogden, UT
November 19, 2026*; 8:00 p.m., ESPN+		at Cal State Fullerton						Titan Gym; Fullerton, CA
November 22, 2026*; 1:00 p.m., Pac-12 YouTube		at Colorado State						Moby Arena; Fort Collins, CO
November 25, 2026*; 1:00 p.m., ESPN+		at Seattle						Redhawk Center; Seattle, WA
December 3, 2026; 6:00 p.m., ESPN+		Utah Tech						Dee Events Center; Ogden, UT
December 5, 2026; 2:00 p.m., ESPN+		Southern Utah						Dee Events Center; Ogden, UT
December 12, 2026*; 12:00 p.m., Pac-12 YouTube		at Utah State						Smith Spectrum; Logan, UT
December 15, 2026*; 2:00 p.m., ESPN+		at BYU						Marriott Center; Provo, UT
December 19, 2026*; 6:00 p.m., ESPN+		La Sierra						Dee Events Center; Ogden, UT
December 31, 2026; 1:00 p.m., ESPN+		at Northern Arizona						Rolle Activity Center; Flagstaff, AZ
January 7, 2027; 7:00 p.m., ESPN+		at Montana						Dahlberg Arena; Missoula, MT
January 9, 2027; 2:00 p.m., ESPN+		at Montana State						Worthington Arena; Bozeman, MT
January 14, 2027; 6:00 p.m., ESPN+		Portland State						Dee Events Center; Ogden, UT
January 16, 2027; 2:00 p.m., ESPN+		Northern Colorado						Dee Events Center; Ogden, UT
January 18, 2027; 6:00 p.m., ESPN+		at Idaho						ICCU Arena; Moscow, ID
January 23, 2027; 4:00 p.m., ESPN+		at Idaho State						Reed Gym; Pocatello, ID
January 25, 2027; 6:00 p.m., ESPN+		Eastern Washington						Dee Events Center; Ogden, UT
January 28, 2027; 6:30 p.m., ESPN+		at Southern Utah						America First Events Center; Cedar City, UT
January 30, 2027; 1:00 p.m., ESPN+		at Utah Tech						Burns Arena; St. George, UT
February 6, 2027; 2:00 p.m., ESPN+		Northern Arizona						Dee Events Center; Ogden, UT
February 11, 2027; 6:00 p.m., ESPN+		at Northern Colorado						Bank of Colorado Arena; Greeley, CO
February 13, 2027; 1:00 p.m., ESPN+		at Portland State						Viking Pavilion; Portland, OR
February 18, 2027; 6:00 p.m., ESPN+		Montana State						Dee Events Center; Ogden, UT
February 20, 2027; 2:00 p.m., ESPN+		Montana						Dee Events Center; Ogden, UT
February 22, 2027; 6:00 p.m., ESPN+		Idaho						Dee Events Center; Ogden, UT
February 27, 2027; 2:00 p.m., ESPN+		Idaho State						Dee Events Center; Ogden, UT
March 1, 2027; 6:00 p.m., ESPN+		at Eastern Washington						Reese Court; Cheney, WA
Big Sky tournament
March 5–10, 2027; TBA		vs.						Idaho Central Arena; Boise, ID
*Non-conference game. ^{#}Rankings from AP Poll. (#) Tournament seedings in parentheses. All times are in Mountain.
