= 2026–27 Grand Canyon Antelopes women's basketball team =

American collegiate basketball season

2026–27 Grand Canyon Antelopes women's basketball
- Conference: Mountain West Conference
- Record: 3–0 (0–0 MW)
- Head coach: Winston Gandy (2nd season)
- Assistant coaches: Adrian Sanders; Matt Shewmake; Jessica Jenkins; Celeste Taylor; Dominique Johnson
- Home arena: Global Credit Union Arena

2026–27 Mountain West Conference women's basketball standings
	Conf.				Overall
Team	W		L	PCT	W		L	PCT
Grand Canyon	0	–	0	–	3	–	0	1.000
UTEP	0	–	0	–	3	–	1	.750
Air Force	0	–	0	–	2	–	2	.500
UC Davis	0	–	0	–	2	–	2	.500
Wyoming	0	–	0	–	2	–	2	.500
Hawai'i	0	–	0	–	1	–	2	.333
UNLV	0	–	0	–	1	–	2	.333
Nevada	0	–	0	–	1	–	3	.250
New Mexico	0	–	0	–	1	–	3	.250
San Jose State	0	–	0	–	0	–	2	.000
† 2027 Mountain West tournament winner As of November 15, 2026

The 2026–27 Grand Canyon Antelopes women's basketball team represents Grand Canyon University during the 2026–27 NCAA Division I women's basketball season. The Antelopes, led by second-year head coach Winston Gandy, play their home games at Global Credit Union Arena in Phoenix, Arizona as first-year members of the Mountain West Conference.

== Previous season ==
The Antelopes finished the 2025–26 season 13–19, 11–9 in Mountain West play to finish in sixth place. As an No. 6 seed in the Mountain West tournament where they defeated Utah State in the first round before losing in the quarterfinals to Colorado State.

== Offseason ==
=== Departures ===
Grand Canyon departures
Name	Num	Pos.	Height	Year	Hometown	Reason for departure
Anisa Jeffries	1	F	5'11"	Senior	Zacatecas, Mexico	Graduated
Ale'jah Douglas	3	G	5'6"	Gradate Student	North Omaha, NE	Graduated
Casey Valenti-Paea	6	G	5'9"	Graduate Student	Melbourne, Australia	Graduated
Karley Johnson	7	G	5'9"	Senior	Oklahoma City, OK	Graduated
Sophia Fontaine	10	F	6'2"	(redshirt) Sophomore	Chelsea, MA	TBD
Holly Griffiths	11	F	6'1"	Junior	Melbourne, Australia	TBD
Favor Ayodele	15	F	6'1"	Graduate Student	Móstoles, Spain	Graduated
Julianna LaMendola	20	G	6'1'	Junior	Coppell, TX	Transferred to Miami (OH)
Sidney Anderson	21	G	5'9"	Freshman	Tucson, AZ	Transferred to Weber State
Norah Moo	24	F	6'2"	Freshman	Wheaton, IL	Transferred to UNLV
Faith Carson	54	F	6'4"	(redshirt) Sophomore	Buchanan, MI	Transferred to UT Arlington

=== Incoming transfers ===
Grand Canyon incoming transfers
Name	Num	Pos.	Height	Year	Hometown	Previous school
Nyadieng Yiech	2	F	6'3"	Sophomore	Calgary, AB	Florida
Dasha Biriuk	7	G	6'1"	Sophomore	Berdianski, Ukraine	Ohio State
Maya Foz	11	G	5'9"	Sophomore	Mississauga, ON	Bradley
Jana Sallman	12	C	6'3"	Senior	Cairo, Egypt	William & Mary
Keana Foz	13	G	5'8"	Junior	Mississauga, ON	Wagner
T'yana Todd	23	G	6'0"	Graduate Student	Vaughan, ON	Ohio State
Ashlynn Chlarson	24	C	6'3"	Senior	Pima, AZ	Arkansas

=== Recruiting class ===
College recruiting
Name	Hometown	School	Height	Weight	Commit date
Lanelle Wright; G	Minnetonka, MN	Minnetonka High School	5 ft 9 in (1.75 m)	N/A	
Lanelle Wright; G	Recruit ratings: 247Sports: ESPN: (93)				
Overall recruit ranking: ESPN: 2253
Note: In many cases, Scout, Rivals, 247Sports, On3, and ESPN may conflict in their listings of height and weight.; In these cases, the average was taken. ESPN grades are on a 100-point scale.; Sources: "2026 Player Commits". ESPN. Archived from the original on September 14, 2026.

==== 2027 recruiting class ====
College recruiting (2027)
Name	Hometown	School	Height	Weight	Commit date
Emely Del Rosario; F	Bronx, NY	Monsignor Scanlan High School	6 ft 2 in (1.88 m)	N/A	
Emely Del Rosario; F	Recruit ratings: ESPN: (92)				
Overall recruit ranking:
Note: In many cases, Scout, Rivals, 247Sports, On3, and ESPN may conflict in their listings of height and weight.; In these cases, the average was taken. ESPN grades are on a 100-point scale.; Sources: "2027 Player Commits". ESPN. Archived from the original on September 14, 2026.

== Roster ==
2026–27 Grand Canyon Antelopes women's basketball team
Players
Coaches

Pos.	#	Name	Height	Year	Previous school	Hometown
G	0	Chloe Mann	5 ft 8 in (1.73 m)	Jr	Cincinnati	Fort Worth, Texas
G	1	Yasmeen Schmidt	5 ft 11 in (1.8 m)	Fr	Cornerstone Christian Schools	San Antonio, Texas
F	2	Nyadieng Yiech	6 ft 3 in (1.91 m)	So	Florida	Calgary, Alberta
G	4	Diamond Wright	5 ft 10 in (1.78 m)	So	Willamette High School	Springfield, Oregon
G	7	Dasha Biriuk	6 ft 1 in (1.85 m)	Fr	Ohio State	Berdiansk, Ukraine
G	8	Sifa Ineza	5 ft 11 in (1.8 m)	RS Sr	Middle Tennessee	Musanze, Rwanda
G	10	Lanelle Wright	5 ft 9 in (1.75 m)	Fr	Minnetonka High School	Minnetonka, Minnesota
G	11	Maya Foz	5 ft 9 in (1.75 m)	So	Bradley	Mississauga, Ontario
C	12	Jana Sallman	6 ft 3 in (1.91 m)	Sr	William & Mary	Cairo, Egypt
G	13	Keana Foz	5 ft 8 in (1.73 m)	Jr	Wagner	Mississauga, Ontario
G	22	Kaitlyn Elsholz	5 ft 11 in (1.8 m)	Sr	Cal State Northridge	Peoria, Arizona
G	23	T'Yana Todd	6 ft 0 in (1.83 m)	GS	Ohio State	Vaughan, Ontario
C	24	Ashlynn Chlarson	6 ft 3 in (1.91 m)	Sr	Arkansas	Pima, Arizona
G	30	KJ McNealy	6 ft 1 in (1.85 m)	Fr	Farragut High School	Knoxville, Tennessee
F	32	Cora Bennett	6 ft 1 in (1.85 m)	Fr	Kingdom Collegiate Academy	San Antonio, Texas
G	33	Ines Zounia	5 ft 10 in (1.78 m)	So	Lycée Voltaire	Lille, France

Head coach

- Winston Gandy (Maryland)

Assistant coach(es)

- Adrian Sanders (Southern)
- Matt Shewmake (Alabama)
- Jessica Jenkins (St. Bonaventure)
- Celeste Taylor (Ohio State)
- Dominique Johnson (Azusa Pacific)

Legend

- (C) Team captain
- (S) Suspended
- (I) Ineligible
- (W) Walk-on
- Injured
- Current redshirt

Roster
Last update: September 14, 2026

== Schedule and results ==
Date time, TV	Rank^{#}	Opponent^{#}	Result	Record	High points	High rebounds	High assists	Site (attendance) city, state
Exhibition
October 27, 2026*; 3:00 p.m., MW+		Utah State	W 78-48		20 – Biriuk	7 – Foz	6 – Foz	Global Credit Union Arena (441); Phoenix, AZ
Non-conference regular season
November 4, 2026*; 6:00 p.m., MW+		Jackson State	W 77-55	1-0	18 – Yiech	11 – Yiech	4 – Tied	Global Credit Union Arena; Phoenix, AZ
November 9, 2026*; 8:00 p.m., CBSSN		Oregon	W 81-74	2-0	20 – Biriuk	10 – Yiech	6 – Yiech	Global Credit Union Arena (2,103); Phoenix, AZ
November 13, 2026*; 6:00 p.m., MW+		Gonzaga	W 82-62	3-0	19 – Foz	7 – Sallman	4 – Mann	Global Credit Union Arena (1,722); Phoenix, AZ
November 17, 2026*; 8:00 p.m., ESPN+		at Santa Clara						Leavey Center; Santa Clara, CA
November 21, 2026*; 4:00 p.m., ACCNX		at SMU						Moody Coliseum; University Park, TX
November 23, 2026*; 1:00 p.m.		vs. High Point; San Diego Classic						Viejas Arena; San Diego, CA
November 25, 2026*; 1:00 p.m.		vs. Winthrop; San Diego Classic						Viejas Arena; San Diego, CA
November 30, 2026*; 7:00 p.m.		at San Francisco						Sobrato Center; San Francisco, CA
December 3, 2026*; 5:00 p.m., MW+		Georgia State						Global Credit Union Arena; Phoenix, AZ
December 7, 2026*; 6:00 p.m., MW+		Southeast Missouri State						Global Credit Union Arena; Phoenix, AZ
December 10, 2026*; 3:00 p.m., Fox 9		at St. Thomas (MN)						Lee & Penny Anderson Arena; St. Paul, MN
December 19, 2026*; 2:00 p.m.		at Northern Arizona						Findlay Toyota Court; Flagstaff, AZ
Mountain West regular season
December 30, 2026; 8:00 p.m., MW+		at San Jose State						Provident Credit Union Event Center; San Jose, CA
January 2, 2027; 1:00 p.m.		at Air Force						Clune Arena; Colorado Springs, CO
January 6, 2027; TBA		New Mexico						Global Credit Union Arena; Phoenix, AZ
January 9, 2027; 5:00 p.m., MW+		at UC Davis						University Credit Union Center; Davis, CA
January 13, 2027; 6:00 p.m., MW+		UTEP						Global Credit Union Arena; Phoenix, AZ
January 16, 2027; 1:00 p.m., MW+		Wyoming						Global Credit Union Arena; Phoenix, AZ
January 23, 2027; 1:00 p.m., MW+		Hawaii						Global Credit Union Arena; Phoenix, AZ
January 27, 2027; 7:00 p.m.		at Nevada						Lawlor Events Center; Reno, NV
January 30, 2027; 1:00 p.m., MW+		UC Davis						Global Credit Union Arena; Phoenix, AZ
February 3, 2027; TBA		at UNLV						Cox Pavilion; Paradise, NV
February 6, 2027; 1:00 p.m.		at New Mexico						The Pit; Albuquerque, NM
February 10, 2027; 6:00 p.m., MW+		San Jose State						Global Credit Union Arena; Phoenix, AZ
February 13, 2027; TBA, MW+		at Hawaii						Stan Sheriff Center; Honolulu, HI
February 17, 2027; 6:00 p.m., MW+		Nevada						Global Credit Union Arena; Phoenix, AZ
February 21, 2027; 1:00 p.m.		UNLV						Global Credit Union Arena; Phoenix, AZ
February 24, 2027; TBA		at UTEP						Don Haskins Center; El Paso, TX
February 27, 2027; 7:00 p.m., MW+		at Wyoming						Arena-Auditorium; Laramie, WY
March 2, 2027; 6:00 p.m., MW+		Air Force						Global Credit Union Arena; Phoenix, AZ
Mountain West tournament
March 7–10, 2027; TBA		vs.						Thomas & Mack Center; Paradise, NV
*Non-conference game. ^{#}Rankings from AP Poll. (#) Tournament seedings in parentheses. All times are in Mountain.
