= 2026–27 Southern Utah Thunderbirds women's basketball team =

American college basketball season

2026–27 Southern Utah Thunderbirds women's basketball
- Conference: Western Athletic Conference
- Record: 2–2 (0–0 WAC)
- Head coach: Tracy Mason (9th season)
- Associate head coach: Jay Johnson
- Assistant coaches: Advit Raghavan; Sam Johnston; Tamia Braggs
- Home arena: America First Event Center

2026–27 Big Sky women's basketball standings
	Conf.				Overall
Team	W		L	PCT	W		L	PCT
Weber State	0	–	0	–	3	–	0	1.000
Montana State	0	–	0	–	2	–	0	1.000
Idaho State	0	–	0	–	3	–	1	.750
Northern Colorado	0	–	0	–	3	–	1	.750
Idaho	0	–	0	–	2	–	1	.667
Utah Tech	0	–	0	–	2	–	1	.667
Eastern Washington	0	–	0	–	2	–	2	.500
Southern Utah	0	–	0	–	2	–	2	.500
Montana	0	–	0	–	1	–	3	.250
Northern Arizona	0	–	0	–	0	–	3	.000
Portland State	0	–	0	–	0	–	4	.000
† 2027 Big Sky tournament winner As of November 15, 2026

The 2026–27 Southern Utah Thunderbirds women's basketball team will represent Southern Utah University during the 2026–27 NCAA Division I women's basketball season. The Thunderbirds, led by ninth-year head coach Tracy Mason, will play their home games at America First Event Center in Cedar City, Utah, and compete as a returning member of the Big Sky Conference.

== Previous season ==
The Thunderbirds finished the 2025–26 season 19–13 overall and 11–7 in WAC play, finishing third in the conference. As the No. 3 seed in the WAC tournament, they lost 65–70 to No. 6 seed UT Arlington.

Following their elimination, the Thunderbirds earned and accepted an at-large bid to the WNIT, making their 2nd overall appearance and first since 2014. They earned a bye to Round 2, where they lost 80–85 to Pepperdine to end their season.

The 2025–26 season was Southern Utah's last as a member of the Western Athletic Conference, as they departed to rejoin the Big Sky Conference following their original exit in 2022. The conference change was announced in June 2025.

== Offseason ==
=== Departures ===
Southern Utah departures
Name	Number	Pos.	Height	Year	Hometown	Reason for departure
Sierra Chambers	3	Guard	5'8"	Sophomore	Danville, CA	Transferred to Nevada
Ashley Banks	13	Center	6'5"	Senior	Boise, ID	Graduated
Nike Borg	15	Center	6'3"	Freshman	Stockholm, Sweden	TBD; entered transfer portal
Olivia Malafu	35	Forward	6'0"	Sophomore	Kapa'a, HI	TBD; not listed on roster

=== Incoming transfers ===
Southern Utah incoming transfers
Name	Number	Pos.	Height	Year	Hometown	Previous school
Melicia Nelson	24	Guard	5'8"	Junior	Window Rock, AZ	Pima CC (NJCAA)

=== Recruiting class ===
There was no 2026 recruiting class.

== Roster ==
2026–27 Southern Utah Thunderbirds women's basketball team
Players
Coaches

Pos.	#	Name	Height	Year	Previous school	Hometown
G	1	Kortney Doman	5 ft 10 in (1.78 m)	Jr	Crane High School	Crane, OR
G	2	Bella Hasan	5 ft 6 in (1.68 m)	Jr	Kamiak High School	Mukilteo, WA
G	3	Vallory Kuelker	5 ft 8 in (1.73 m)	So	Pinewood School	Boulder Creek, CA
F	4	Brooklyn Fely	6 ft 0 in (1.83 m)	Sr	Pleasant Grove High School; Umpqua Community College	Orem, UT
G	5	Charli Kay	5 ft 9 in (1.75 m)	Sr	Marist Regional College	Smithton, Australia
G	10	Amiah Lewis	5 ft 7 in (1.7 m)	Fr	Mater Dei High School	La Habra, CA
G	11	Morgan Trigueiro	5 ft 10 in (1.78 m)	Sr	Caruthers High School; College of the Sequoias	Caruthers, CA
F	20	Emily Scholtes	6 ft 1 in (1.85 m)	RS So	Lavalla Catholic College	Traralgon, Australia
G	22	Devyn Kiernan	5 ft 11 in (1.8 m)	So	Mater Dei High School	Orange, CA
G	24	Melicia Nelson	5 ft 8 in (1.73 m)	Jr	Window Rock High School; Pima CC	Window Rock, AZ
F	33	Diana Sorrondo	6 ft 4 in (1.93 m)	Fr	Oak Park High School	Arroyo Grande, CA
F	34	Denver Anderson	6 ft 1 in (1.85 m)	Jr	Mount Zion High School	Mount Zion, IL
F	44	Ava Uhrich	6 ft 0 in (1.83 m)	Sr	Pinewood School	Burlingame, CA

Head coach

- Tracy Mason (Saint Mary's)

Assistant coach(es)

- Jay Johnson (Saint Mary's)
- Advit Raghavan (Puget Sound)
- Sam Johnston (Southern Utah)
- Tamia Braggs (Santa Clara)

Legend

- (C) Team captain
- (S) Suspended
- (I) Ineligible
- (W) Walk-on
- Injured
- Current redshirt

Roster
Last update: October 12, 2026

== Schedule and results ==
Date time, TV	Rank^{#}	Opponent^{#}	Result	Record	High points	High rebounds	High assists	Site (attendance) city, state
Exhibition
October 16, 2026*; 6:30 p.m.		Fort Lewis	L 77–79		–	–	–	America First Event Center; Cedar City, UT
Regular season
November 2, 2026*; 5:00 p.m., ESPN+		Redlands	W 87-31	1-0	17 – Sorrondo	19 – Fely	5 – Tied	America First Event Center (630); Cedar City, UT
November 6, 2026*; 11:00 a.m., ESPN+		at New Mexico State	L 63-64	1-1	19 – Uhrich	3 – Tied	2 – Tied	Pan American Center (1,260); Las Cruces, NM
November 9, 2026*; 6:30 p.m., ESPN+		Park–Gilbert	W 98-56	2-1	19 – Uhrich	11 – Fely	5 – Uhrich	America First Event Center (322); Cedar City, UT
November 13, 2026*; 7:00 p.m., YouTube		at Washington State	L 69-72	2-2	19 – Uhrich	11 – Uhrich	4 – Uhrich	Beasley Coliseum (906); Pullman, WA
November 18, 2026*; 6:30 p.m.		at Air Force						Clune Arena; Colorado Springs, CO
November 22, 2026 (Note: Non-conference game which is part of a home-and-home series that was established prior to the team's return to the Big Sky Conference.)*; 1:00 p.m.		at Eastern Washington						America First Event Center; Cedar City, UT
November 24, 2026*; 6:30 p.m.		Nelson AIC						America First Event Center; Cedar City, UT
November 28, 2026*; 2:00 p.m.		San Diego						America First Event Center; Cedar City, UT
December 3, 2026; 7:00 p.m.		at Idaho State						Reed Gym; Pocatello, ID
December 5, 2027; 2:00 p.m., ESPN+		at Weber State						Dee Events Center; Ogden, UT
December 9, 2027*; 2:00 p.m.		at BYU						Marriott Center; Provo, UT
December 12, 2027*; 1:00 p.m., MW+		at San Jose State						Provident Credit Union Event Center; San Jose, CA
December 18, 2026*; 6:30 p.m.		Cal State Fullerton						America First Event Center; Cedar City, UT
December 22, 2027*; 1:00 p.m.		at California						Haas Pavilion; Berkeley, CA
December 31, 2026; 6:30 p.m.		Eastern Washington						America First Event Center; Cedar City, UT
January 2, 2027; 2:00 p.m.		Idaho						America First Event Center; Cedar City, UT
January 7, 2027; 6:00 p.m.		at Northern Colorado						Bank of Colorado Arena; Greeley, CO
January 9, 2027; 3:00 p.m.		at Portland State						Viking Pavilion; Portland, OR
January 16, 2027; 2:00 p.m.		Utah Tech						America First Event Center; Cedar City, UT
January 18, 2027; 7:00 p.m.		at Montana State						Worthington Arena; Bozeman, MT
January 25, 2027; 6:30 p.m.		Montana						America First Event Center; Cedar City, UT
January 28, 2027; 6:30 p.m.		Weber State						America First Event Center; Cedar City, UT
January 30, 2027; 2:00 p.m.		Idaho State						America First Event Center; Cedar City, UT
February 4, 2027; 7:00 p.m.		at Idaho						ICCU Arena; Moscow, ID
February 6, 2027; 3:00 p.m.		at Eastern Washington						Reese Court; Cheney, WA
February 8, 2027; 7:00 p.m.		Northern Arizona						America First Event Center; Cedar City, UT
February 13, 2027; 1:00 p.m.		at Utah Tech						Burns Arena; St. George, UT
February 17, 2027; 6:30 p.m.		Portland State						America First Event Center; Cedar City, UT
February 20, 2027; 12:00 p.m.		Northern Colorado						America First Event Center; Cedar City, UT
February 22, 2027; 6:30 p.m.		Montana State						America First Event Center; Cedar City, UT
February 27, 2027; 2:00 p.m.		at Northern Arizona						Rolle Activity Center; Flagstaff, AZ
March 1, 2027; 7:00 p.m.		at Montana						Dahlberg Arena; Missoula, MT
Big Sky tournament
March 5–10, 2027; TBA		vs.						Idaho Central Arena; Boise, ID
*Non-conference game. ^{#}Rankings from AP Poll. (#) Tournament seedings in parentheses. All times are in Mountain.
