= 2026–27 UNLV Lady Rebels basketball team =

American collegiate basketball season

2026–27 UNLV Lady Rebels basketball
- Conference: Mountain West Conference
- Record: 2–3 (0–0 MW)
- Head coach: Lindy La Rocque (7th season)
- Assistant coaches: Mia Bell; Joslyn Tinkle; Staci Gregorio Foss
- Home arena: The Pavilion; Thomas & Mack Center

2026–27 Mountain West Conference women's basketball standings
	Conf.				Overall
Team	W		L	PCT	W		L	PCT
UTEP	0	–	0	–	5	–	1	.833
Grand Canyon	0	–	0	–	3	–	2	.600
Air Force	0	–	0	–	2	–	3	.400
San Jose State	0	–	0	–	2	–	3	.400
UNLV	0	–	0	–	2	–	3	.400
Wyoming	0	–	0	–	2	–	3	.400
New Mexico	0	–	0	–	2	–	4	.333
UC Davis	0	–	0	–	2	–	4	.333
Hawai'i	0	–	0	–	1	–	5	.167
Nevada	0	–	0	–	1	–	5	.167
† 2027 Mountain West tournament winner As of November 22, 2026

The 2026–27 UNLV Lady Rebels basketball team represents the University of Nevada, Las Vegas during the 2026–27 NCAA Division I women's basketball season. The Lady Rebels, led by seventh-year head coach Lindy La Rocque, play their home games at the The Pavilion, attached to the Thomas & Mack Center, in Paradise, Nevada, as members of the Mountain West Conference.

== Previous season ==
The Lady Rebels finished the 2025–26 season 21–11, 15–5 in Mountain West play, to finish in a tie for second place. As an No. 2 seed in the Mountain West tournament, where they defeated Fresno State in the quarterfinals before losing to Colorado State in the semifinals. Despite having 21 wins, they were not invited to the postseason tournament.

== Offseason ==
=== Departures ===
UNLV departures
Name	Num	Pos.	Height	Year	Hometown	Reason for departure
Teagan Colvin	0	G	5' 7"	Sophomore	Coeur d'Alene, ID	Transferred to Portland State
Mariah Elohim	2	G	5' 10"	Senior	Westlake, CA	Graduated
Shelbee Brown	3	F	6' 0"	Graduate student	Memphis, TN	Graduated
Destiny Brown	5	F	6' 4"	Senior	Los Angeles, CA	Graduated
Hodaya Kabada	6	G	5' 10"	Freshman	Holon, Israel	Transferred to Cal State Northridge
Destiny Leo	7	G	5' 10"	Graduate student	Willowick, OH	Graduated
Alexis Swillis	11	C	6' 3"	Freshman	Fresno, CA	Transferred to Nevada
Ongolea Afu	12	F	5' 10"	Junior	Sandy, UT	Transferred to West Georgia
Aaliyah Alexander	25	G	5' 8"	Graduate student	Federal Way, WA	Graduated
Erica Collins	31	C	6' 3"	Senior	Chino Hills, CA	Graduated

=== Incoming transfers ===
UNLV incoming transfers
Name	Num	Pos.	Height	Year	Hometown	Previous school
Bergan Kinnebrew	0	G	5' 11"	Senior	Bismarck, ND	Mary (D-II)
Maia Rosarion	8	G	5' 10"	Junior	Vancouver, BC	Nevada
Norah Moo	14	F	6' 2"	Sophomore	Wheaton, IL	Grand Canyon
Marley Washenitz	18	G	5' 7"	Senior	Fairmont, WV	Arizona State

=== Recruiting class ===
College recruiting
Name	Hometown	School	Height	Weight	Commit date
Keonni Lewis; PG	Las Vegas, NV	Democracy Prep Academy	5 ft 6 in (1.68 m)	N/A	
Keonni Lewis; PG	Recruit ratings: ESPN: (92)				
Jayla Constant; PG	Oklahoma City, OK	Grind Prep	5 ft 10 in (1.78 m)	N/A	
Jayla Constant; PG	Recruit ratings: ESPN: (92)				
Overall recruit ranking: ESPN: 2439
Note: In many cases, Scout, Rivals, 247Sports, On3, and ESPN may conflict in their listings of height and weight.; In these cases, the average was taken. ESPN grades are on a 100-point scale.; Sources: "2026 Player Commits". ESPN. Archived from the original on August 27, 2026.

==== 2027 recruiting class ====
College recruiting (2027)
Name	Hometown	School	Height	Weight	Commit date
Harmony Golightly; PG	Santa Ana, CA	Mater Dei High School	5 ft 8 in (1.73 m)	N/A	
Harmony Golightly; PG	Recruit ratings: ESPN: (92)				
Overall recruit ranking:
Note: In many cases, Scout, Rivals, 247Sports, On3, and ESPN may conflict in their listings of height and weight.; In these cases, the average was taken. ESPN grades are on a 100-point scale.; Sources: "2027 Player Commits". ESPN. Archived from the original on August 27, 2026.

== Roster ==
2026–27 UNLV Lady Rebels women's basketball team
Players
Coaches

Pos.	#	Name	Height	Year	Previous school	Hometown
G	0	Brgan Kinnebrew	5 ft 11 in (1.8 m)	Sr	UMary	Bismarck, North Dakota
F	2	Terri'A Russell	6 ft 2 in (1.88 m)	Fr	Oakland Technical High School	Oakland, California
G	3	Keonni Lewis	5 ft 6 in (1.68 m)	Fr	Democracy Preparatory Academy at Agassi Campus	Las Vegas, Nevada
F	7	Arianna Davis	6 ft 1 in (1.85 m)	Fr	Lancaster High School	Dallas, Texas
G	8	Maia Rosarion	5 ft 10 in (1.78 m)	So	Nevada	Vancouver, British Columbia
G	10	Jasmyn Lott	5 ft 8 in (1.73 m)	RS Sr	Frisco Memorial High School	Frisco, Texas
G	11	Jayla Constant	5 ft 10 in (1.78 m)	Fr	Putnam City North High School	Oklahoma City, Oklahoma
F	14	Norah Moo	6 ft 2 in (1.88 m)	So	Grand Canyon	Wheaton, Illinois
F	20	Ava Bergerson	6 ft 0 in (1.83 m)	Fr	La Salle Catholic College Preparatory	Milwaukie, Oregon
F	21	Trystan James	5 ft 10 in (1.78 m)	So	Duncanville High School	Monroe, Louisiana
G	24	Tristian Williams	5 ft 8 in (1.73 m)	Fr	Laurel School	Cleveland, Ohio
F	32	Meadow Roland	6 ft 2 in (1.88 m)	RS Jr	San Joaquin Memorial High School	Fresno, California

Head coach

- Lindy La Rocque (Stanford)

Assistant coach(es)

- Mia Bell (UNLV)
- Joslyn Tinkle (Stanford)
- Staci Gregorio Foss (San Diego Mesa)

Legend

- (C) Team captain
- (S) Suspended
- (I) Ineligible
- (W) Walk-on
- Injured
- Current redshirt

Roster

== Schedule and results ==
Date time, TV	Rank^{#}	Opponent^{#}	Result	Record	High points	High rebounds	High assists	Site (attendance) city, state
Exhibition
October 27, 2026*; 6:00 p.m.		Cal State Los Angeles	W 89–81		27 – Roland	15 – Moo	6 – Constant	The Pavilion (654); Paradise, NV
Non-conference regular season
November 2, 2026*; 1:00 p.m., CBSSN		vs. No. 3 USC; Hall of Fame Series - Las Vegas	L 68–100	0–1	12 – Rosarion	7 – Tied	3 – Constant	T-Mobile Arena (2,031); Paradise, NV
November 6, 2026*; 6:30 p.m., MW+		UTSA	W 69–51	1–1	22 – Lott	11 – Moo	4 – Roland	The Pavilion (983); Paradise, NV
November 10, 2026*; 6:30 p.m.		Arizona State	L 58–65	1–2	–	–	–	The Pavilion (1,510); Paradise, NV
November 15, 2026*; 1:00 p.m.		Montana State	Canceled due to FAA nationwide ground stop					The Pavilion; Paradise, NV
November 17, 2026*; 6:30 p.m., MW+		Rice	L 72–74	1–3	23 – Roland	6 – Tied	3 – Constant	The Pavilion (773); Paradise, NV
November 21, 2026*; 2:30 p.m., ESPN+		Cincinnati	W 85–58	2–3	27 – Roland	9 – Roland	5 – Constant	The Pavilion (1,213); Paradise, NV
November 25, 2026*; 12:00 p.m.		Loyola Marymount; UNLV Thanksgiving Turkey Tip-Off						Thomas & Mack Center; Paradise, NV
November 27, 2026*; 2:30 p.m.		Butler; UNLV Thanksgiving Turkey Tip-Off						Thomas & Mack Center; Paradise, NV
December 2, 2026*; 3:30 p.m., FS1		at UConn						Harry A. Gampel Pavilion; Storrs, CT
December 5, 2026*; 10:00 a.m.		at Boston University						Cabot Center; Boston, MA
December 13, 2026*; 1:00 p.m.		vs. UC Santa Barbara; Jack Jones Classic						Lee's Family Forum; Henderson, NV
December 16, 2026*; 6:00 p.m.		at Washington State						Beasley Coliseum; Pullman, WA
December 20, 2026*; 1:00 p.m.		Vanguard						The Pavilion; Paradise, NV
Mountain West regular season
December 30, 2026; 6:30 p.m.		UC Davis						The Pavilion; Paradise, NV
January 2, 2027; 2:00 p.m.		UTEP						The Pavilion; Paradise, NV
January 6, 2027; 7:00 p.m.		at San Jose State						Provident Credit Union Event Center; San Jose, CA
January 9, 2027; TBA		at Wyoming						Arena-Auditorium; Laramie, WY
January 13, 2027; TBA		Air Force						The Pavilion; Paradise, NV
January 16, 2027; 5:00 p.m.		at New Mexico						The Pit; Albuquerque, NM
January 20, 2027; 6:30 p.m.		Hawaii						The Pavilion; Paradise, NV
January 24, 2027; 1:00 p.m., The CW		at Nevada						Lawlor Events Center; Reno, NV
January 27, 2027; 6:00 p.m.		at UTEP						Don Haskins Center; El Paso, TX
January 30, 2027; 2:00 p.m.		Wyoming						The Pavilion; Paradise, NV
February 3, 2027; TBA		Grand Canyon						The Pavilion; Paradise, NV
February 6, 2027; 12:00 p.m.		at Air Force						Clune Arena; Colorado Springs, CO
February 13, 2027; 7:00 p.m., The CW		New Mexico						The Pavilion; Paradise, NV
February 17, 2027; 6:00 p.m.		at UC Davis						University Credit Union Center; Davis, CA
February 21, 2026; 12:00 p.m.		at Grand Canyon						Global Credit Union Arena; Phoenix, AZ
February 24, 2027; TBA		San Jose State						The Pavilion; Paradise, NV
February 27, 2027; TBA		at Nevada						Lawlor Events Center; Reno, NV
March 2, 2027; 7:00 p.m.		at Hawaii						Stan Sheriff Center; Honolulu, HI
Mountain West tournament
March 7–10, 2027; TBA		vs.						Thomas & Mack Center; Paradise, NV
*Non-conference game. ^{#}Rankings from AP Poll. (#) Tournament seedings in parentheses. All times are in Pacific.
