= 2026–27 Northern Colorado Bears women's basketball team =

Intercollegiate basketball season

2026–27 Northern Colorado Bears women's basketball
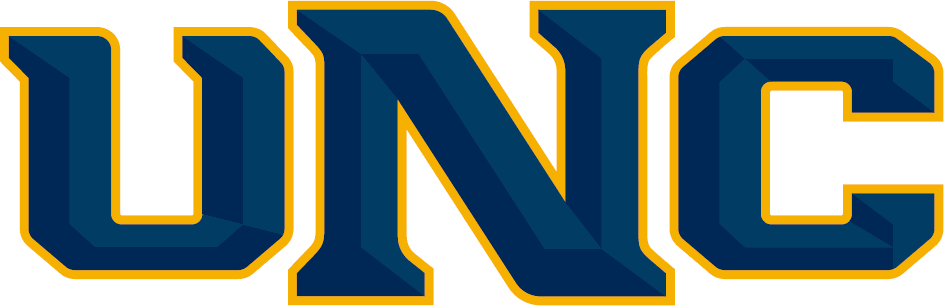
- Conference: Big Sky Conference
- Record: 1–1 (0–0 Big Sky)
- Head coach: Kristen Mattio (6th season)
- Associate head coach: Camille Perkins
- Assistant coaches: DeAndre Betty; Jenna Knudson; Jamie Williams
- Home arena: Bank of Colorado Arena

2026–27 Big Sky women's basketball standings
	Conf.				Overall
Team	W		L	PCT	W		L	PCT
Idaho	0	–	0	–	2	–	0	1.000
Montana	0	–	0	–	1	–	0	1.000
Montana State	0	–	0	–	1	–	0	1.000
Northern Colorado	0	–	0	–	1	–	0	1.000
Weber State	0	–	0	–	1	–	0	1.000
Eastern Washington	0	–	0	–	1	–	1	.500
Idaho State	0	–	0	–	1	–	1	.500
Southern Utah	0	–	0	–	1	–	1	.500
Utah Tech	0	–	0	–	1	–	1	.500
Northern Arizona	0	–	0	–	0	–	1	.000
Portland State	0	–	0	–	0	–	2	.000
† 2027 Big Sky tournament winner As of November 8, 2026

The 2026–27 Northern Colorado Bears women's basketball team currently represents the University of Northern Colorado during the 2025–26 NCAA Division I women's basketball season. The Bears, led by sixth-year head coach Kristen Mattio, play their home games at the Bank of Colorado Arena in Greeley, Colorado, and compete as a member of the Big Sky Conference.

== Previous season ==
The Bears finished the 2025–26 season 23–11 overall and 13–5 in Big Sky play, finishing third in the conference. As the No. 3 seed in the Big Sky tournament, they lost 53–55 in the quarterfinals to No. 6 Eastern Washington.

Following the tournament, the Bears earned and accepted an at-large bid to the WNIT, their 5th overall appearance and their first since 2019. They defeated Air Force 79–72 in Round 1, before falling on the road 60–80 to South Dakota in Round 2 to end their season.

== Offseason ==
=== Departures ===
Northern Colorado departures
Name	Number	Pos.	Height	Year	Hometown	Reason for departure
Olivia Loomis-Goltl	0	Guard	5'10"	Sophomore	Bridgeport, NE	Transferred to Western Washington (D-II)
London Gamble	3	Guard	5'8"	Senior	Westlake Village, CA	Transferred to UC Riverside (Note: Only played 2 games in the 2025–26 season; later removed from roster.)
Claire Fraser	4	Forward	6'0"	Sophomore	Brisbane, Australia	Transferred to Seattle
Louise Dykstra	10	Forward	6'2"	Sophomore	Vancouver, British Columbia	Transferred to Point Loma (D-II)
Ruthie Loomis-Goltl	12	Forward	6'3"	Sophomore	Bridgeport, NE	Transferred to Western Washington (D-II)
Lele Tanuvasa	13	Guard	6'0"	Sophomore	Eureka, CA	Entered transfer portal
Gabi Fields	15	Guard	5'5"	Senior	Brownfield, TX	Graduated
Aniah Hall	22	Forward	6'3"	Senior	Temple, TX	Graduated
Julia Riley	33	Guard	6'1"	Senior	Granite Bay, CA	Graduated

=== Incoming transfers ===
Northern Colorado incoming transfers
Name	Number	Pos.	Height	Year	Hometown	Previous school
Ericka Huggins	10	Forward	6'0"	Junior	Wilmington, DE	Delaware State
Ellie Magestro-Kennedy	12	Guard	5'8"	Senior	Janesville, WI	Wright State
Mia Galbraith	22	Guard	5'11"	Senior	Sunshine Coast, Australia	Texas State
Alex Pirog	34	Center	6'3"	Graduate Student	Highlands Ranch, CO	Montana

=== Recruiting class ===
There was no 2026 recruiting class.

== Roster ==
2026–27 Northern Colorado Bears women's basketball team
Players
Coaches

Pos.	#	Name	Height	Year	Previous school	Hometown
G	2	Heather Baymon	5 ft 8 in (1.73 m)	Jr	Langham Creek High School; Texas State	Phoenix, AZ
G	5	Neenah George	5 ft 8 in (1.73 m)	Jr	Legion Prep	Dallas, TX
G/F	7	Lucy Mead	6 ft 2 in (1.88 m)	Fr		Sydney, Australia
F	8	Erin Powell	6 ft 0 in (1.83 m)	Jr	Charnwood College; Colorado	Hampshire, England
F	10	Ericka Huggins	6 ft 0 in (1.83 m)	Jr	St. Elizabeth High School; Delaware State	Wilmington, DE
F	11	Lilah Moore	5 ft 10 in (1.78 m)	GS	Pinnacle High School	Phoenix, AZ
G	12	Ellie Magestro-Kennedy	5 ft 8 in (1.73 m)	Sr	Joseph A. Craig High School; Wright State	Janesville, WI
G	22	Mia Galbraith	5 ft 11 in (1.8 m)	Sr	Texas State	Sunshine Coast, Australia
G	23	Da'Nae Jefferson	5 ft 8 in (1.73 m)	Fr	Putnam City North High School	Oklahoma City, OK
F	24	Tatum West	6 ft 2 in (1.88 m)	Jr	Crandall High School	Combine, Texas
C	34	Alex Pirog	6 ft 3 in (1.91 m)	GS	Highlands Ranch High School; Montana	Highlands Ranch, CO
C	44	Averie Varhaug	6 ft 3 in (1.91 m)	Fr	McKinnon Park Secondary School	Caledonia, ON

Head coach

- Kristen Mattio (Evangel)

Assistant coach(es)

- Camille Perkins (Angelo State)
- DeAndre Betty (Arizona State)
- Jenna Knudson (Embry-Riddle)
- Jamie Williams (Coastal Carolina)

Legend

- (C) Team captain
- (S) Suspended
- (I) Ineligible
- (W) Walk-on
- Injured
- Current redshirt

Roster
Last update: October 8, 2026

== Schedule and results ==
Date time, TV	Rank^{#}	Opponent^{#}	Result	Record	High points	High rebounds	High assists	Site (attendance) city, state
Regular season
November 2, 2026*; 5:00 p.m., ESPN+		Hastings	W 102–76	1–0	30 – Baymon	17 – West	7 – George	Bank of Colorado Arena (452); Greeley, CO
November 7, 2026*; 6:00 p.m., SECN+		at No. 6 Texas	L 29–91	1–1	7 – Galbraith	4 – Galbraith	3 – George	Moody Center (9,306); Austin, TX
November 9, 2026*; 6:00 p.m.		Northern New Mexico						Bank of Colorado Arena; Greeley, CO
November 14, 2026*; 6:00 p.m.		Sam Houston						Bank of Colorado Arena; Greeley, CO
November 16, 2026*; 6:00 p.m.		UC Davis						Bank of Colorado Arena; Greeley, CO
November 21, 2026*; 2:00 p.m.		at BYU						Marriott Center; Provo, UT
November 24, 2026*; 6:00 p.m.		at Denver						Hamilton Gymnasium; Denver, CO
November 27, 2026*; 2:00 p.m.		Colorado Christian						Bank of Colorado Arena; Greeley, CO
December 3, 2026; 6:00 p.m.		at Idaho						ICCU Arena; Moscow, ID
December 5, 2026; 2:00 p.m.		at Eastern Washington						Reese Court; Cheney, WA
December 12, 2026*; 3:00 p.m.		at Washington						Alaska Airlines Arena; Seattle, WA
December 15, 2026*; 4:30 p.m.		at Omaha						Baxter Arena; Omaha, NE
December 19, 2026*; 1:00 p.m.		at Colorado State						Moby Arena; Fort Collins, CO
December 22, 2026*; 1:00 p.m.		North Texas						Bank of Colorado Arena; Greeley, CO
December 31, 2026; 2:00 p.m.		Montana						Bank of Colorado Arena; Greeley, CO
January 2, 2027; 2:00 p.m.		Montana State						Bank of Colorado Arena; Greeley, CO
January 7, 2027; 6:00 p.m.		Southern Utah						Bank of Colorado Arena; Greeley, CO
January 9, 2027; 2:00 p.m.		Utah Tech						Bank of Colorado Arena; Greeley, CO
January 14, 2027; 7:00 p.m.		at Idaho State						Reed Gym; Pocatello, ID
January 16, 2027; 2:00 p.m.		at Weber State						Dee Events Center; Ogden, UT
January 23, 2027; 2:00 p.m.		Northern Arizona						Bank of Colorado Arena; Greeley, CO
January 25, 2027; 8:00 p.m.		at Portland State						Viking Pavilion; Portland, OR
January 28, 2027; 12:00 p.m.		Eastern Washington						Bank of Colorado Arena; Greeley, CO
January 30, 2027; 2:00 p.m.		Idaho						Bank of Colorado Arena; Greeley, CO
February 4, 2027; 7:00 p.m.		at Montana State						Worthington Arena; Bozeman, MT
February 6, 2027; 2:00 p.m.		at Montana						Dahlberg Arena; Missoula, MT
February 11, 2027; 6:00 p.m.		Weber State						Bank of Colorado Arena; Greeley, CO
February 13, 2027; 2:00 p.m.		Idaho State						Bank of Colorado Arena; Greeley, CO
February 17, 2027; 7:00 p.m.		at Utah Tech						Burns Arena; St. George, UT
February 20, 2027; 12:00 p.m.		at Southern Utah						America First Event Center; Cedar City, UT
February 27, 2027; 2:00 p.m.		Portland State						Bank of Colorado Arena; Greeley, CO
March 1, 2027; 2:00 p.m.		at Northern Arizona						Rolle Activity Center; Flagstaff, AZ
Big Sky tournament
March 5–10, 2027; TBA		vs.						Idaho Central Arena; Boise, ID
*Non-conference game. ^{#}Rankings from AP Poll. (#) Tournament seedings in parentheses. All times are in Mountain.
