= 2026–27 Northern Arizona Lumberjacks women's basketball team =

American college basketball season

2026–27 Northern Arizona Lumberjacks women's basketball
- Conference: Big Sky Conference
- Record: 1–3 (0–0 Big Sky)
- Head coach: Laura Dinkins (2nd season)
- Associate head coach: Bryan Camacho
- Assistant coaches: Nicholas Milan; Dajae Black
- Home arena: Rolle Activity Center

2026–27 Big Sky women's basketball standings
	Conf.				Overall
Team	W		L	PCT	W		L	PCT
Idaho	0	–	0	–	4	–	1	.800
Weber State	0	–	0	–	4	–	1	.800
Northern Colorado	0	–	0	–	4	–	2	.667
Montana State	0	–	0	–	2	–	1	.667
Southern Utah	0	–	0	–	3	–	2	.600
Idaho State	0	–	0	–	4	–	3	.571
Utah Tech	0	–	0	–	3	–	3	.500
Eastern Washington	0	–	0	–	2	–	2	.500
Northern Arizona	0	–	0	–	1	–	3	.250
Montana	0	–	0	–	1	–	4	.200
Portland State	0	–	0	–	0	–	6	.000
† 2027 Big Sky tournament winner As of November 22, 2026

The 2026–27 Northern Arizona Lumberjacks women's basketball team currently represents Northern Arizona University during the 2026–27 NCAA Division I women's basketball season. The Lumberjacks, led by second-year head coach Laura Dinkins, play their home games at the Rolle Activity Center, in Flagstaff, Arizona, and compete as a member of the Big Sky Conference.

== Previous season ==
The Lumberjacks finished the 2025–26 season 10–22 overall and 6–12 in Big Sky play, finishing seventh in the conference. As the No. 7 seed in the Big Sky tournament, they were defeated by No. 8 seed Montana 60–61 in the first round to end their season.

== Offseason ==
=== Departures ===
Northern Arizona departures
Name	Num.	Pos.	Height	Year	Hometown	Reason for departure
Eri Blithikioti	5	Guard	5'11"	Junior	Athens, Greece	Entered transfer portal
Hannah Williams	10	Forward	5'11"	Freshman	Tucson, AZ	Transferred to Embry–Riddle, Prescott (NAIA)
Audrey Taylor	11	Guard	5'9"	Senior	Boise, ID	Graduated
Addison Dunn	12	Guard	5'10"	Freshman	Midland, TX	Transferred to Western Texas College (NJCAA)
J'Bionna Robinson	13	Guard	5'7"	Freshman	Atlanta, GA	Transferred to Georgetown
Valentina Saric	14	Guard/Forward	6'2"	(redshirt) Junior	Los Altos, CA	Transferred to Mount St. Mary's
Kayla Williams	23	Forward	6'0"	Senior	San Diego, CA	Graduated
Naomi White	25	Guard	5'9"	(redshirt) Freshman	Omaha, NE	Transferred to Tennessee
Faith Curry	30	Guard/Forward	6'0"	(redshirt) Freshman	Bakersfield, CA	Transferred to Cal State Bakersfield
Simone Morris	35	Guard	5'10"	Graduate Student	Carson, CA	Graduated

=== Incoming transfers ===
Northern Arizona incoming transfers
Name	Num.	Pos.	Height	Year	Hometown	Previous school
Olivia Moore	2	Forward	5'9"	Graduate Student	Spokane, WA	South Dakota
Aaliyah Smith	11	Guard	5'7"	Senior	Madison, WI	Eastern New Mexico (D-II)
Leah Bullard	12	Forward	6'1"	Junior	Tampa, FL	UMass
Ray'ven Robinson	13	Guard	5'8"	Senior	Minneapolis, MN	Georgia Southwestern State
Morgan Hawkins	14	Guard	5'7"	Junior	Corona, CA	Cal State Bakersfield
Tianna Knighton	22	Guard	5'9"	Junior	Phoenix, AZ	Central Arizona College (NJCAA)
Alondra Lizama	23	Forward	5'10"	Senior	North Hollywood, CA	Cal State Northridge
Micayla Silas	24	Guard	5'9"	Senior	Phoenix, AZ	Milwaukee

=== Recruiting class ===
There was no 2026 recruiting class.

== Roster ==
2026–27 Northern Arizona Lumberjacks women's basketball team
Players
Coaches

Pos.	#	Name	Height	Year	Previous school	Hometown
F	0	Emma Dasovich	6 ft 1 in (1.85 m)	Jr	Valley Vista High School; New Mexico State	Surprise, AZ
G	1	Alyssa Harris	5 ft 7 in (1.7 m)	Jr	Page High School; Husson	Kaibito, AZ
F	2	Olivia Moore	5 ft 9 in (1.75 m)	GS	Mead High School; South Dakota	Spokane, WA
G	3	Madison Watts	5 ft 10 in (1.78 m)	Jr	Leuzinger High School; Loyola Marymount	San Pedro, CA
G	4	Shayla Cordis	5 ft 8 in (1.73 m)	Fr	North Thurston High School	Olympia, WA
G	5	Naomi Johnson	6 ft 1 in (1.85 m)	Fr	West Campus High School	Sacramento, CA
F	7	Layla Davis	6 ft 0 in (1.83 m)	Jr	Village Christian School; Cal State Fullerton	Lancaster, CA
G	11	Aaliyah Smith	5 ft 7 in (1.7 m)	Sr	La Follette High School; Eastern New Mexico	Madison, WI
F	12	Leah Bullard	6 ft 1 in (1.85 m)	Jr	Dr. Phillips High School; UMass	Tampa, FL
G	13	Ray'ven Robinson	5 ft 8 in (1.73 m)	Sr	Cretin-Derham High School; Georgia Southwestern State	Minneapolis, MN
G	14	Morgan Hawkins	5 ft 7 in (1.7 m)	Jr	Centennial High School; Cal State Bakersfield	Corona, CA
G	22	Tianna Knighton	5 ft 9 in (1.75 m)	Jr	Arcadia High School; Central Arizona College	Phoenix, AZ
F	23	Alondra Lizama	5 ft 10 in (1.78 m)	Sr	Bishop Alemany High School; Cal State Northridge	North Hollywood, CA
G	24	Micayla Silas	5 ft 9 in (1.75 m)	Sr	Mesa High School; Milwaukee	Phoenix, AZ

Head coach

- Laura Dinkins (Northern Arizona)

Assistant coach(es)

- Bryan Camacho (UCLA)
- Nicholas Milan (Cal State Fullerton)
- Dajae Black (Lewis)

Legend

- (C) Team captain
- (S) Suspended
- (I) Ineligible
- (W) Walk-on
- Injured
- Current redshirt

Roster
Last update: November 15, 2026

== Schedule and results ==
Date time, TV	Rank^{#}	Opponent^{#}	Result	Record	High points	High rebounds	High assists	Site (attendance) city, state
Regular season
November 5, 2026*; 6:30 p.m., ESPN+		at Arizona State	L 52–79	0–1	10 – Tied	6 – Tied	5 – Hawkins	Desert Financial Arena (2,179); Tempe, AZ
November 10, 2026*; 6:00 p.m., ESPN+		UC Irvine	L 74–76	0–2	19 – Smith	9 – Dasovich	6 – Smith	Rolle Activity Center (394); Flagstaff, AZ
November 14, 2026*; 1:00 p.m., YouTube		at Fresno State	L 71–85	0–3	15 – Smith	10 – Watts	4 – Cordis	Save Mart Center (1,041); Fresno, CA
November 18, 2026*; 6:00 p.m., ESPN+		Bethesda	W 120–39	1–3	17 – Dasovich	10 – Watts	7 – Harris	Rolle Activity Center (172); Flagstaff, AZ
November 23, 2026*; 8:00 p.m., B1G+		at USC						Galen Center; Los Angeles, CA
November 28, 2026*; 2:00 p.m., ESPN+		UC San Diego						Rolle Activity Center; Flagstaff, AZ
December 3, 2026; 7:00 p.m., ESPN+		at Montana						Dahlberg Arena; Missoula, MT
December 5, 2026; 2:00 p.m., ESPN+		at Montana State						Worthington Arena; Bozeman, MT
December 13, 2026*; 2:00 p.m., ESPN+		at Arizona						McKale Center; Tucson, AZ
December 16, 2026*; 6:00 p.m., ESPN+		Park–Gilbert						Rolle Activity Center; Flagstaff, AZ
December 19, 2026*; 2:00 p.m., ESPN+		Grand Canyon						Rolle Activity Center; Flagstaff, AZ
December 21, 2026*; 7:00 p.m., ESPN+		at Long Beach State						LBS Financial Credit Union Pyramid; Long Beach, CA
December 31, 2026; 1:00 p.m., ESPN+		Weber State						Rolle Activity Center; Flagstaff, AZ
January 2, 2027; 2:00 p.m., ESPN+		Idaho State						Rolle Activity Center; Flagstaff, AZ
January 7, 2027; 6:00 p.m., ESPN+		Eastern Washington						Rolle Activity Center; Flagstaff, AZ
January 9, 2027; 12:00 p.m., ESPN+		Idaho						Rolle Activity Center; Flagstaff, AZ
January 14, 2027; 7:00 p.m., ESPN+		at Utah Tech						Burns Arena; St. George, UT
January 21, 2027; 6:00 p.m., ESPN+		Portland State						Rolle Activity Center; Flagstaff, AZ
January 23, 2027; 2:00 p.m., ESPN+		at Northern Colorado						Bank of Colorado Arena; Greeley, CO
January 28, 2027; 6:00 p.m., ESPN+		Montana State						Rolle Activity Center; Flagstaff, AZ
January 30, 2027; 2:00 p.m., ESPN+		Montana						Rolle Activity Center; Flagstaff, AZ
February 4, 2027; 6:00 p.m., ESPN+		at Idaho State						Reed Gym; Pocatello, ID
February 6, 2027; 2:00 p.m., ESPN+		at Weber State						Dee Events Center; Ogden, UT
February 8, 2027; 7:00 p.m., ESPN+		at Southern Utah						America First Event Center; Cedar City, UT
February 11, 2027; 6:00 p.m., ESPN+		Utah Tech						Rolle Activity Center; Flagstaff, AZ
February 18, 2027; 7:00 p.m., ESPN+		at Idaho						ICCU Arena; Moscow, ID
February 20, 2027; 3:00 p.m., ESPN+		at Eastern Washington						Reese Court; Cheney, WA
February 22, 2027; 8:00 p.m., ESPN+		at Portland State						Viking Pavilion; Portland, OR
February 27, 2027; 2:00 p.m., ESPN+		Southern Utah						Rolle Activity Center; Flagstaff, AZ
March 1, 2027; 6:00 p.m., ESPN+		Northern Colorado						Rolle Activity Center; Flagstaff, AZ
Big Sky tournament
March 5–10, 2027; TBA		vs.						Idaho Central Arena; Boise, ID
*Non-conference game. ^{#}Rankings from AP poll. (#) Tournament seedings in parentheses. All times are in Mountain.
