= 2026–27 UTEP Miners women's basketball team =

American collegiate basketball season

2026–27 UTEP Miners women's basketball
- Conference: Mountain West Conference
- Record: 2–0 (0–0 MW)
- Head coach: Keitha Adams (4th, 20th overall season)
- Associate head coach: Ewa Laskowska
- Assistant coaches: Jareica Hughes; Denise Rosario
- Home arena: Don Haskins Center

2026–27 Mountain West Conference women's basketball standings
| | Conf. | | | | Overall |
| Team | W | | L | PCT | W | | L | PCT |
|---|---|---|---|---|---|---|---|---|
| Air Force | 0 | – | 0 | – | 2 | – | 0 | 1.000 |
| UTEP | 0 | – | 0 | – | 2 | – | 0 | 1.000 |
| Grand Canyon | 0 | – | 0 | – | 1 | – | 0 | 1.000 |
| New Mexico | 0 | – | 0 | – | 1 | – | 1 | .500 |
| UNLV | 0 | – | 0 | – | 1 | – | 1 | .500 |
| UC Davis | 0 | – | 0 | – | 1 | – | 2 | .333 |
| San Jose State | 0 | – | 0 | – | 0 | – | 1 | .000 |
| Hawai'i | 0 | – | 0 | – | 0 | – | 2 | .000 |
| Nevada | 0 | – | 0 | – | 0 | – | 2 | .000 |
| Wyoming | 0 | – | 0 | – | 0 | – | 2 | .000 |
† 2027 Mountain West tournament winner As of November 10, 2026

The 2026–27 UTEP Miners women's basketball team represents the University of Texas at El Paso during the 2026–27 NCAA Division I women's basketball season. The Miners, led by head coach Keitha Adams in the fourth season of her second stint as head coach, and twentieth season overall, play their home games at the Don Haskins Center in El Paso, Texas, as first year members of the Mountain West Conference.

== Previous season ==
The Miners finished the 2025–26 season 13–17, 5–13 in C-USA play, to finish in a tie for tenth place. As No. 10 seed in the C-USA tournament they lost in the first round to Jacksonville State.

This marked UTEP's final season as members of Conference USA before transitioning to the Mountain West Conference on July 1, 2026.

== Offseason ==
=== Departures ===
UTEP departures
| Name | Num | Pos. | Height | Year | Hometown | Reason for departure |
|---|---|---|---|---|---|---|
| Aaliyah Davis | 1 | G | 5'7" | Senior | El Paso, TX | Graduated |
| Sirviva Legions | 2 | G | 5'8" | Senior | Brooklyn, NY | Graduated |
| Ivane Tensaie | 3 | G | 5'7" | Graduate Student | Roseville, MN | Graduated |
| Delma Zita | 4 | G | 5'8" | Graduate Student | Maputo, Mozambique | Graduated |
| Heaven Samayoa-Mathis | 5 | G | 5'7" | Senior | Sacramento, CA | Graduated |
| Brooklyn Terry | 8 | G/F | 6'0" | Freshman | Mansfield, TX | Transferred to East Texas A&M |
| Osadebamwen Igbinedion Omoruyi | 10 | F | 6'4" | Sophomore | Madrid, Spain | Transferred to Valapariso |
| Portia Adams | 11 | G | 5'6" | Senior | Cedar Hill, TX | Graduated |
| Irene Asensio | 12 | G | 5'8" | Sophomore | Barcelona, Spain | Transferred to Ohio |
| Ndack Mbengue | 13 | F | 6'3" | Senior | Bergamo, Italy | Graduated |
| Abby Priscilla | 15 | G | 5'11" | Junior | Kampala, Uganda | Transferred to UT Permian |
| Blessing Okhwodiasa | 20 | F | 6'2" | Freshman | Madrid, Spain | Transferred to Cisco College |

=== Incoming transfers ===
UTEP incoming transfers
| Name | Num | Pos. | Height | Year | Hometown | Previous school |
|---|---|---|---|---|---|---|
| Imani Warren | 1 | G | 5'10" | Senior | Milwaukee, WI | New Mexico State |
| Arminda Joaquim | 5 | F | 6'1" | Junior | Angola | Odessa College |
| Isabel Joao | 11 | F | 6'1" | Junior | Lubango, Angola | South Plains College |
| Zainab Olalekan | 12 | C | 6'1" | Junior | Ibadan, Nigeria | Clarendon College |
| Armanda Sindalawa | 24 | G | 5'11" | Junior | Lobito, Angola | Clarendon College |
| Dilangue Cruz | 27 | F | 6'2" | Junior | Lubango, Angola | South Plains College |

==== Recruiting ====
There was no recruiting class of 2026.

== Roster ==
2026–27 UTEP Miners women's basketball team
Players
Coaches

| Pos. | # | Name | Height | Year | Previous school | Hometown |
|---|---|---|---|---|---|---|
| G | 1 | Imani Warren | 5 ft 10 in (1.78 m) | Sr | New Mexico State | Milwaukee, Wisconsin |
| G | 2 | Charlotte Aldridge | 6 ft 1 in (1.85 m) | Fr | Downingtown East High School | Downingtown, Pennsylvania |
| G | 3 | Aolani Woldai | 5 ft 7 in (1.7 m) | So | Brewer High School | Fort Worth, Texas |
| F | 5 | Arminda Joaquim | 6 ft 2 in (1.88 m) | Jr | Odessa College | Angola |
| F | 8 | Kobe Johnson | 6 ft 0 in (1.83 m) | Fr | North Shore Senior High School | Houston, Texas |
| F | 11 | Isabel Joao | 6 ft 1 in (1.85 m) | Jr | South Plains College | Lubango, Angola |
| F | 12 | Zainab Olalekan | 6 ft 1 in (1.85 m) | Jr | Clarendon College | Ibadan, Nigeria |
| G | 14 | Tatiana Collazo | 5 ft 8 in (1.73 m) | Sr | San Jose City College | San Jose, California |
| F | 21 | Krista Lukasevica | 6 ft 2 in (1.88 m) | Fr | | Riga, Latvia |
| F | 22 | Mary Moses Amaniyo | 6 ft 1 in (1.85 m) | Jr | KIU Rangers | Arua, Uganda |
| G | 24 | Armanda Sindalawa | 5 ft 10 in (1.78 m) | Jr | Clarendon College | Lobito, Angola |
| F | 27 | Dilangue Cruz | 6 ft 2 in (1.88 m) | Jr | South Plains College | Lubango, Angola |
| G | 50 | Apostolia Zormpala | 5 ft 10 in (1.78 m) | Fr | | Kavala, Greece |

Head coach

- Keitha Adams (Southwestern College)

Assistant coach(es)

- Ewa Laskowska (Kansas State)
- Jareica Hughes (UTEP)
- Denise Rosario (Columbia (MO))

Legend

- (C) Team captain
- (S) Suspended
- (I) Ineligible
- (W) Walk-on
- Injured
- Current redshirt

Roster

== Schedule and results ==
| Date time, TV | Rank^{#} | Opponent^{#} | Result | Record | High points | High rebounds | High assists | Site (attendance) city, state |
Non-conference regular season\
| November 2, 2026*; 7:00 p.m., MW+ | | Western New Mexico | W 100-64 | 1-0 | 19 – Olalekan | 7 – Olalekan | 4 – Sindalawa | Don Haskins Center (985); El Paso, TX |
| November 7, 2026*; 1:00 p.m., MW+ | | Incarnate Word | W 74-68 | 2-0 | 13 – Tied | 11 – João | 5 – Sindalawa | Don Haskins Center (796); El Paso, TX |
| November 10, 2026*; 7:00 p.m., MW+ | | New Mexico State; Battle of I-10 | | | | | | Don Haskins Center; El Paso, TX |
| November 14, 2026*; 1:00 p.m., MW+ | | Alabama State | | | | | | Don Haskins Center; El Paso, TX |
| November 18, 2026*; 11:30 a.m., MW+ | | Kansas City | | | | | | Don Haskins Center; El Paso, TX |
| November 21, 2026*; 2:00 p.m., MW+ | | Texas Southern | | | | | | Don Haskins Center; El Paso, TX |
| November 25, 2026*; 2:00 p.m. | | vs. Bradley; Texas State Tournament | | | | | | Strahan Arena; San Marcos, TX |
| November 27, 2026*; 4:00 p.m. | | vs. Pacific; Texas State Tournament | | | | | | Strahan Arena; San Marcos, TX |
| November 28, 2026*; 3:00 p.m., YouTube | | at Texas State; Texas State Tournament | | | | | | Strahan Arena; San Marcos, TX |
| December 5, 2026*; 1:00 p.m., ESPN+ | | at New Mexico State; Battle of I-10 | | | | | | Pan American Center; Las Cruces, NM |
| December 12, 2026*; 3:00 p.m., ESPN+ | | at UC Irvine | | | | | | Bren Events Center; Irvine, CA |
| December 14, 2026*; 7:30 p.m., ESPN+ | | at Cal State Bakersfield | | | | | | Icardo Center; Bakersfield, CA |
| December 19, 2026*; 12:00 p.m., MW+ | | UC Santa Barbara | | | | | | Don Haskins Center; El Paso, TX |
Mountain West regular season
| December 30, 2026; 7:00 p.m., MW+ | | at New Mexico | | | | | | The Pit; Albuquerque, NM |
| January 2, 2027; 3:00 p.m., MW+ | | at UNLV | | | | | | Cox Pavilion; Paradise, NV |
| January 6, 2027; 7:00 p.m., MW+ | | UC Davis | | | | | | Don Haskins Center; El Paso, TX |
| January 9, 2027; 2:00 p.m., MW+ | | San Jose State | | | | | | Don Haskins Center; El Paso, TX |
| January 13, 2027; 6:00 p.m., MW+ | | at Grand Canyon | | | | | | Global Credit Union Arena; Phoenix, AZ |
| January 16, 2027; 2:00 p.m., MW+ | | Nevada | | | | | | Don Haskins Center; El Paso, TX |
| January 20, 2027; 6:30 p.m., MW+ | | at Wyoming | | | | | | Arena-Auditorium; Laramie, WY |
| January 23, 2027; 2:00 p.m., MW+ | | Air Force | | | | | | Don Haskins Center; El Paso, TX |
| January 27, 2027; 7:00 p.m., MW+ | | UNLV | | | | | | Don Haskins Center; El Paso, TX |
| January 30, 2027; 2:00 p.m., MW+ | | at Nevada | | | | | | Lawlor Events Center; Reno, NV |
| February 6, 2027; 2:00 p.m., MW+ | | Hawaii | | | | | | Don Haskins Center; El Paso, TX |
| February 10, 2027; 7:00 p.m., MW+ | | at UC Davis | | | | | | University Credit Union Center; Davis, CA |
| February 13, 2027; 2:00 p.m., MW+ | | Wyoming | | | | | | Don Haskins Center; El Paso, TX |
| February 17, 2027; 6:30 p.m., MW+ | | at Air Force | | | | | | Clune Arena; Colorado Springs, CO |
| February 20, 2027; 2:00 p.m., MW+ | | at San Jose State | | | | | | Provident Credit Union Event Center; San Jose, CA |
| February 24, 2027; 7:00 p.m., MW+ | | Grand Canyon | | | | | | Don Haskins Center; El Paso, TX |
| February 27, 2027; 9:00 p.m., MW+ | | at Hawaii | | | | | | Stan Sheriff Center; Honolulu, HI |
| March 2, 2027; 7:00 p.m., MW+ | | New Mexico | | | | | | Don Haskins Center; El Paso, TX |
Mountain West tournament
| March 7–10, 2027; TBA | | vs. | | | | | | Thomas & Mack Center; Paradise, NV |
*Non-conference game. ^{#}Rankings from AP Poll. (#) Tournament seedings in parentheses. All times are in Mountain.
