= 2026–27 Air Force Falcons women's basketball team =

American college basketball season

2026–27 Air Force Falcons women's basketball
- Conference: Mountain West Conference
- Record: 2–2 (0–0 MW)
- Head coach: Stacy McIntyre (3rd season)
- Assistant coaches: Derek Brooks; Mackenzie Head; Lauren Baker
- Home arena: Clune Arena

2026–27 Mountain West Conference women's basketball standings
	Conf.				Overall
Team	W		L	PCT	W		L	PCT
Grand Canyon	0	–	0	–	3	–	0	1.000
Air Force	0	–	0	–	2	–	1	.667
UTEP	0	–	0	–	2	–	1	.667
UC Davis	0	–	0	–	2	–	2	.500
Wyoming	0	–	0	–	2	–	2	.500
Hawai'i	0	–	0	–	1	–	2	.333
Nevada	0	–	0	–	1	–	2	.333
New Mexico	0	–	0	–	1	–	2	.333
UNLV	0	–	0	–	1	–	2	.333
San Jose State	0	–	0	–	0	–	2	.000
† 2027 Mountain West tournament winner As of November 15, 2026

The 2026–27 Air Force Falcons women's basketball team currently represents the United States Air Force Academy during the 2026–27 NCAA Division I women's basketball season. The Falcons, led by third-year head coach Stacy McIntyre, play their home games at Clune Arena in Air Force Academy, Colorado and compete as a member of the Mountain West Conference.

== Previous season ==
The Falcons finished the 2025–26 season 16–19, 7–13 in Mountain West play, to finish in a tie for eighth place. They made a run in the Mountain West tournament, where they defeated Wyoming in the first round, San Diego State in the quarterfinals, and Boise State in the semifinals, before being defeated by Colorado State in the championship game. They received an at-large bid to the WNIT, where they would be defeated by Northern Colorado in the first round.

== Roster ==
2026–27 Air Force Falcons women's basketball team
Players
Coaches

Pos.	#	Name	Height	Year	Previous school	Hometown
G	0	Jordyn DeVaughn	5 ft 6 in (1.68 m)	Sr	Lone Star High School	Little Elm, Texas
G	1	Alexis Cortez	5 ft 11 in (1.8 m)	Sr	Allen High School	Allen, Texas
G	3	Felicity McFillin	5 ft 7 in (1.7 m)	So	USAFA Prep	Gladwyne, Pennsylvania
G	4	AJ Mannering	5 ft 8 in (1.73 m)	So	USAFA Prep	Peyton, Colorado
G	8	Chloe Parker	5 ft 8 in (1.73 m)	Fr	Riverdale Ridge High School	Highlands Ranch, Colorado
G	9	Maddy Jensen	5 ft 7 in (1.7 m)	So	Brookfield Central High School	Brookfield, Wisconsin
G	10	Jayda McNabb	5 ft 10 in (1.78 m)	Sr	USAFA Prep	Rapid City, South Dakota
G	11	Eva Love	5 ft 9 in (1.75 m)	So	USAFA Prep	Albuquerque, New Mexico
G	12	Morgan Ainsworth	5 ft 10 in (1.78 m)	Fr	Colony High School	Palmer, Alaska
G	13	Keelie O'Hollaren	5 ft 10 in (1.78 m)	Sr	Lakeridge High School	Lake Oswego, Oregon
G	14	Carson Fayard	5 ft 10 in (1.78 m)	Fr	Niceville High School	Niceville, Florida
F	20	Marisa Taylor	6 ft 3 in (1.91 m)	Fr	Valor Christian	Kennesaw, Georgia
G	22	Dixon McLanahan	5 ft 11 in (1.8 m)	Fr	Folsom High School	Folsom, California
F	23	Julia Leach	6 ft 2 in (1.88 m)	So	Cherry Creek High School	Greenwood Village, Colorado
G	24	Marissa Hargrave	5 ft 8 in (1.73 m)	Sr	Andress High School	El Paso, Texas
F	44	Taylor Sipfle	6 ft 4 in (1.93 m)	Fr	Hamilton High School	Gilbert, Arizona

Head coach

- Stacy McIntyre (Kentucky)

Assistant coach(es)

- Derek Brooks (Air Force)
- Mackenzie Head (Bethel University)
- Lauren Baker (Nelson University)

Legend

- (C) Team captain
- (S) Suspended
- (I) Ineligible
- (W) Walk-on
- Injured
- Current redshirt

Roster
Last update: November 13, 2026

== Schedule and results ==
Date time, TV	Rank^{#}	Opponent^{#}	Result	Record	High points	High rebounds	High assists	Site (attendance) city, state
Non-conference regular season
November 2, 2026*; 6:30 pm, MW+		Denver	W 66–45	1–0	19 – DeVaughn	18 – McNabb	5 – DeVaughn	Clune Arena (623); Air Force Academy, CO
November 7, 2026*; 1:00 pm, MW+		Saint Mary's	W 61–37	2–0	20 – O'Hollaren	11 – McNabb	7 – DeVaughn	Clune Arena (507); Air Force Academy, CO
November 11, 2026*; 4:00 pm, MW+		San Francisco	L 70–77	2–1	20 – McNabb	10 – McNabb	4 – DeVaughn	Clune Arena (408); Air Force Academy, CO
November 14, 2026*; 11:00 am, ESPN+		at Navy	L 66–75	2–2	25 – McNabb	15 – McNabb	4 – DeVaughn	Alumni Hall (1,302); Annapolis, MD
November 18, 2026*; 6:30 pm, MW+		Southern Utah						Clune Arena; Air Force Academy, CO
November 22, 2026*; 11:00 am, Summit League Network		at Omaha						Baxter Arena; Omaha, NE
November 26, 2026*; 3:30 pm, ESPN+		vs. Texas Tech; Paradise Jam Island Division semifinal						UVI Sports and Fitness Center; St. Thomas, USVI
November 28, 2026*; 11:30 a.m./ 2:00 p.m., ESPN+		vs. Xavier or Santa Clara; Paradise Jam Island Division						UVI Sports and Fitness Center; St. Thomas, USVI
December 1, 2026*; 4:00 pm, MW+		Chadron State						Clune Arena; Air Force Academy, CO
December 5, 2026*; 1:00 pm, MW+		Army						Clune Arena; Air Force Academy, CO
December 9, 2026*; 6:30 pm, MW+		Kansas City						Clune Arena; Air Force Academy, CO
December 18, 2026*; 7:00 pm		at Pepperdine						Riptide Arena; Malibu, CA
December 20, 2026*; 12:00 pm, ESPN+		at Cal State Fullerton						Titan Gym; Fullerton, CA
Mountain West regular season
December 30, 2026; 6:30 pm, MW+		Wyoming						Clune Arena; Air Force Academy, CO
January 2, 2027; 1:00 pm, MW+		Grand Canyon						Clune Arena; Air Force Academy, CO
January 6, 2027; 7:00 pm, MW+		at Nevada						Lawlor Events Center; Reno, NV
January 9, 2027; 4:00 pm, MW+		Hawaii						Clune Arena; Air Force Academy, CO
January 13, 2027; 7:30 pm, MW+		at UNLV						The Pavilion; Paradise, NV
January 16, 2027; 3:00 pm, MW+		at San Jose State						Provident Credit Union Event Center; San Jose, CA
January 20, 2027; 6:30 pm, MW+		Nevada						Clune Arena; Air Force Academy, CO
January 23, 2027; 2:00 pm, MW+		at UTEP						Don Haskins Center; El Paso, TX
January 30, 2027; 1:00 pm, MW+		New Mexico						Clune Arena; Air Force Academy, CO
February 3, 2027; 5:30 pm, MW+		at UC Davis						University Credit Union Center; Davis, CA
February 6, 2027; 1:00 pm, MW+		UNLV						Clune Arena; Air Force Academy, CO
February 10, 2027; 9:00 pm, MW+		at Hawaii						Stan Sheriff Center; Honolulu, HI
February 13, 2027; 1:00 pm, MW+		San Jose State						Clune Arena; Air Force Academy, CO
February 17, 2027; 6:30 pm, MW+		UTEP						Clune Arena; Air Force Academy, CO
February 20, 2027; 2:00 pm, MW+		at Wyoming						Arena-Auditorium; Laramie, WY
February 24, 2027; 11:00 am, MW+		UC Davis						Clune Arena; Air Force Academy, CO
February 27, 2027; 1:00 pm, MW+		at New Mexico						The Pit; Albuquerque, NM
March 2, 2027; 6:00 pm, MW+		at Grand Canyon						Global Credit Union Arena; Phoenix, AZ
Mountain West tournament
March 7–10, 2027; TBA		vs.						Thomas & Mack Center; Paradise, NV
*Non-conference game. ^{#}Rankings from AP Poll. (#) Tournament seedings in parentheses. All times are in Mountain.
