= 2026–27 UC Davis Aggies women's basketball team =

American collegiate basketball season

2026–27 UC Davis Aggies women's basketball
- Conference: Mountain West Conference
- Record: 0–0 (0–0 Mountain West)
- Head coach: Jennifer Gross (16th season)
- Associate head coach: Joe Teramoto
- Assistant coaches: Matt Klemin; Vicki Baugh; Erica Adams
- Home arena: University Credit Union Center

2026–27 Mountain West Conference women's basketball standings
	Conf.				Overall
Team	W		L	PCT	W		L	PCT
Air Force	0	–	0	–	2	–	0	1.000
UTEP	0	–	0	–	2	–	0	1.000
Grand Canyon	0	–	0	–	1	–	0	1.000
New Mexico	0	–	0	–	1	–	1	.500
UC Davis	0	–	0	–	1	–	1	.500
UNLV	0	–	0	–	1	–	1	.500
San Jose State	0	–	0	–	0	–	1	.000
Hawai'i	0	–	0	–	0	–	2	.000
Nevada	0	–	0	–	0	–	2	.000
Wyoming	0	–	0	–	0	–	2	.000
† 2027 Mountain West tournament winner As of November 9, 2026

The 2026–27 UC Davis Aggies women's basketball team represents the University of California, Davis during the 2026–27 NCAA Division I women's basketball season. The Aggies, led by 16th-year head coach Jennifer Gross, play their home games at the University Credit Union Center in Davis, California as first year members of the Mountain West Conference.

== Previous season ==
The Aggies finished the 2025–26 season 23–11, 15–5 in Big West play, to finish in third place. They defeated UC Riverside in the quarterfinals before losing to UC San Diego in the semifinals of the Big West tournament.

They received an at-large bid to the WNIT, where they lost in the first round to Pepperdine in the first round.

This will be the Aggies' last season as members of the Big West Conference, as they will join the Mountain West Conference in all sports except football, effective July 1, 2026.

== Offseason ==
=== Departures ===
UC Davis departures
Name	Num	Pos.	Height	Year	Hometown	Reason for departure
Ryann Bennett	2	G	5'8"	Sophomore	Long Beach, CA	Transferred to USC
Nya Epps	4	G	5'10"	Senior	El Cerrito, CA	Graduated
Ally Fitzgerald	5	F	6'2"	Senior	St. Louis, MO	Graduated
Helen Matthews	6	G	5'10"	Graduate student	Kaiapoi, New Zealand	Graduated
Victoria Baker	23	G	5'9"	(redshirt) Senior	Austin, TX	Graduated
Megan Norris	25	C	6'3"	(redshirt) Senior	Menlo Park, CA	Graduated

=== Incoming transfers ===
UC Davis incoming transfers
Name	Num	Pos.	Height	Year	Hometown	Previous school
Angeliki Ziaka		G	5'9"	Junior	Athens, Greece	Davidson

=== Recruiting class ===
There was no 2026 recruiting class.

== Roster ==
2026–27 UC Davis Aggies women's basketball team
Players
Coaches

Pos.	#	Name	Height	Year	Previous school	Hometown
G	1	Carrington Davis	5 ft 10 in (1.78 m)	So	Rialto High School	Rialto, California
G	9	Avery Sussex	5 ft 8 in (1.73 m)	Jr	Riverside Secondary School	Coquitlam, British Columbia
F	10	Tegan Young	6 ft 1 in (1.85 m)	Sr	Manhattan	Leominster, Massachusetts
G	11	Emmy Ersdala	6 ft 1 in (1.85 m)	So	Norrköping Dolphins	Västerås, Sweden
G	15	Sophie Lentfer	6 ft 0 in (1.83 m)	So	Grace Christian School	Anchorage, Alaska
F	21	Theoni Tsami	6 ft 1 in (1.85 m)	RS Jr	Kronos Agiou Dimitriou	Athens, Greece
G		Anna Bassett	6 ft 0 in (1.83 m)	Fr	St. Peter's Lutheran	Brisbane, Australia
G		Layla Dixon	5 ft 11 in (1.8 m)	Fr	Carondelet High School	Concord, California
G		Rebecca Donnelly	6 ft 1 in (1.85 m)	Fr	Norths Bears	Sydney, Australia
C		Holly Ensoll	6 ft 6 in (1.98 m)	Fr	Copleston Basketball Academy	London, England
F		Marta Forsline	6 ft 3 in (1.91 m)	Fr	Mesabi East High School	Aurora, Minnesota
F		Taylor Hicks	6 ft 0 in (1.83 m)	Fr	Hutto High School	Hutto, Texas
G		Angeliki Ziaka	5 ft 9 in (1.75 m)	Jr	San Francisco	Athens, Greece

Head coach

- Jennifer Gross (UC Davis)

Assistant coach(es)

- Joe Teramoto (Cal Poly)
- Matt Klemin (Cal Poly)
- Vicki Baugh (Tennessee)
- Erica Adams (Cal State Northridge)

Legend

- (C) Team captain
- (S) Suspended
- (I) Ineligible
- (W) Walk-on
- Injured
- Current redshirt

Roster
Last update: August 28, 2026

== Schedule and results ==
Date time, TV	Rank^{#}	Opponent^{#}	Result	Record	High points	High rebounds	High assists	Site (attendance) city, state
Non-conference regular season
November 2, 2026*; 6:00 p.m., MW+		Jessup	W 82–42	1–0	17 – Young	9 – Lentner	4 – Sussex	University Credit Union Center (430); Davis, CA
November 6, 2026*; 2:00 p.m., ESPN+		at Eastern Washington	L 72–76	1–1	24 – Sussex	7 – Sussex	5 – Ziaka	Reese Court (114); Cheney, WA
November 8, 2026*; 2:00 p.m., ACCNX		at Stanford	L 60–67	1–2	13 – Tied	7 – Tied	3 – Tied	Maples Pavilion (2,098); Stanford, CA
November 12, 2026*; 11:00 a.m.		Cal State Fullerton						University Credit Union Center; Davis, CA
November 16, 2026*; 5:00 p.m.		at Northern Colorado						Bank of Colorado Arena; Greeley, CO
November 20, 2026*; 5:00 p.m.		California Baptist						University Credit Union Center; Davis, CA
November 22, 2026*; 1:00 p.m.		at Boise State						ExtraMile Arena; Boise, ID
November 20, 2026*; 3:30 p.m.		vs. Troy; Nugget Classic						Lawlor Events Center; Reno, NV
November 29, 2026*; 10:30 a.m.		vs. New Mexico State; Nugget Classic						Lawlor Events Center; Reno, NV
December 2, 2026*; 6:00 p.m.		at Pacific						Alex G. Spanos Center; Stockton, CA
December 6, 2026*; 2:00 p.m.		Chico State						University Credit Union Center; Davis, CA
December 13, 2026*; 2:00 p.m.		Montana						University Credit Union Center; Davis, CA
December 17, 2026*; 5:00 p.m.		at Utah Valley						UCCU Center; Orem, UT
December 20, 2026*; 9:00 a.m.		at Harvard						Lavietes Pavilion; Cambridge, MA
Mountain West regular season
December 30, 2026; 6:30 p.m.		at UNLV						Cox Pavilion; Paradise, NV
January 2, 2027; 2:00 p.m.		Hawaii						University Credit Union Center; Davis, CA
January 6, 2027; TBA		at UTEP						Don Haskins Center; El Paso, TX
January 9, 2027; 4:00 p.m.		Grand Canyon						University Credit Union Center; Davis, CA
January 13, 2027; 6:00 p.m.		Wyoming						University Credit Union Center; Davis, CA
January 16, 2027; TBA		at Hawaii						Stan Sheriff Center; Honolulu, HI
January 23, 2027; 4:00 p.m.		San Jose State						University Credit Union Center; Davis, CA
January 27, 2027; 6:00 p.m.		at New Mexico						The Pit; Albuquerque, NM
January 30, 2027; 12:00 p.m.		at Grand Canyon						Global Credit Union Arena; Phoenix, AZ
February 3, 2027; 4:30 p.m.		Air Force						University Credit Union Center; Davis, CA
February 6, 2027; 1:00 p.m.		at Wyoming						Arena-Auditorium; Laramie, WY
February 10, 2027; 6:00 p.m.		UTEP						University Credit Union Center; Davis, CA
February 13, 2027; TBA		at Nevada						Lawlor Events Center; Reno, NV
February 17, 2027; 6:00 p.m.		UNLV						University Credit Union Center; Davis, CA
February 20, 2027; 4:00 p.m.		New Mexico						University Credit Union Center; Davis, CA
February 24, 2027; 10:00 a.m.		at Air Force						Clune Arena; Colorado Springs, CO
February 27, 2027; 2:00 p.m., MW+		at San Jose State						Provident Credit Union Event Center; San Jose, CA
March 2, 2027; 6:00 p.m.		Nevada						University Credit Union Center; Davis, CA
Mountain West tournament
March 7–10, 2027; TBA		vs.						Thomas & Mack Center; Paradise, NV
*Non-conference game. ^{#}Rankings from AP Poll. (#) Tournament seedings in parentheses. All times are in Pacific.
