= 2026–27 Portland State Vikings women's basketball team =

American college basketball season

2026–27 Portland State Vikings women's basketball
- Conference: Big Sky Conference
- Record: 0–2 (0–0 Big Sky)
- Head coach: Karlie Burris (2nd season)
- Associate head coach: Kerri Nakamoto
- Assistant coaches: Hailey King; Jodi Page
- Home arena: Viking Pavilion

2026–27 Big Sky women's basketball standings
	Conf.				Overall
Team	W		L	PCT	W		L	PCT
Idaho	0	–	0	–	2	–	0	1.000
Weber State	0	–	0	–	2	–	0	1.000
Montana State	0	–	0	–	1	–	0	1.000
Eastern Washington	0	–	0	–	1	–	1	.500
Montana	0	–	0	–	1	–	1	.500
Northern Colorado	0	–	0	–	1	–	1	.500
Idaho State	0	–	0	–	1	–	1	.500
Southern Utah	0	–	0	–	1	–	1	.500
Utah Tech	0	–	0	–	1	–	1	.500
Northern Arizona	0	–	0	–	0	–	1	.000
Portland State	0	–	0	–	0	–	2	.000
† 2027 Big Sky tournament winner As of November 8, 2026

The 2026–27 Portland State Vikings women's basketball team will represent Portland State University during the 2026–27 NCAA Division I women's basketball season. The Vikings, led by second-year head coach Karlie Burris, will play their home games at the Viking Pavilion in Portland, Oregon, and compete as a member of the Big Sky Conference.

== Previous season ==
The Vikings finished the 2025–26 season 6–25 overall and 2–16 in Big Sky play, finishing last in the conference. As the No. 10 seed in the Big Sky tournament, they lost 53–76 in the first round to No. 9 Weber State to end their season.

== Offseason ==
=== Departures ===
Portland State departures
Name	Number	Pos.	Height	Year	Hometown	Reason for departure
Jamia Carter	2	Guard	5'7"	Senior	Las Vegas, NV	Graduated
Sophie Buzzard	4	Guard	5'10"	Freshman	Camas, WA	Transferred to Seattle
Ajae Yoakum	5	Forward	6'0"	(redshirt) Senior	Portland, OR	Graduated
Cici Ellington	8	Guard	6'0"	(redshirt) Senior	Portland, OR	Graduated
Hannah Chicken	9	Forward	6'0"	Freshman	Taree, Australia	Transferred to Illinois State
Alani Encinas	13	Guard	5'7"	Senior	Sierra Vista, AZ	Graduated
Katelyn Best	20	Forward	6'3"	Sophomore	Phoenix, AZ	Transferred to Eckerd (D-II)
Taylor Moffatt	23	Guard	5'8"	Senior	Mount Barker, Australia	Graduated

=== Incoming transfers ===
Portland State incoming transfers
Name	Number	Pos.	Height	Year	Hometown	Previous school
Teagan Colvin	0	Guard	5'7"	Junior	Coeur d'Alene, ID	UNLV
Jordyn Smith	15	Forward	6'2"	Sophomore	Tigard, OR	Cal Poly Humboldt (D-II)
Sara Barhoum	25	Guard	5'10"	Sophomore	Happy Valley, OR	Oregon

=== Recruiting class ===
There was no 2026 recruiting class.

== Roster ==
{Years are listed according to the new NCAA age-based eligibility model.

2026–27 Portland State Vikings women's basketball team
Players
Coaches

Pos.	#	Name	Height	Year	Previous school	Hometown
G	0	Teagan Colvin	5 ft 7 in (1.7 m)	Jr	Coeur d'Alene High School; UNLV	Coeur d'Alene, ID
G	1	Kailee Field	5 ft 10 in (1.78 m)	RS Fr	Brisbane State High School	Brisbane, Australia
G	2	Ryme Jaekel	5 ft 9 in (1.75 m)	RS Fr	Wilsonville High School	Gladstone, OR
G	3	Laynee Torres-Kahapea	5 ft 6 in (1.68 m)	Sr	Punahou School	Kāneʻohe, HI
G	5	Liv Collins	5 ft 8 in (1.73 m)	Fr	Sumner High School	Sumner, WA
F	10	Kirstine Munk	6 ft 0 in (1.83 m)	Sr	Niels Brock handelsgymnasium Central Arizona College	Copenhagen, Denmark
G	11	Maile Starns	5 ft 6 in (1.68 m)	Fr	Legend High School	Parker, CO
G	12	Kyleigh Brown	5 ft 8 in (1.73 m)	Jr	Silverton High School	Silverton, OR
F	13	Alex Padilla	6 ft 1 in (1.85 m)	Fr	Tualatin High School	Tualatin, OR
G	14	Maaya Lucas	5 ft 10 in (1.78 m)	Fr	Tualatin High School	Tualatin, OR
F	15	Jordyn Smith	6 ft 2 in (1.88 m)	So	Tualatin High School; Cal Poly Humboldt	Tigard, OR
G	22	Aspen McClees	5 ft 9 in (1.75 m)	Fr	Gilbert High School	Gilbert, AZ
F	23	Emma Zuniga	5 ft 10 in (1.78 m)	Fr	West Salem High School	Keizer, OR
G	25	Sara Barhoum	5 ft 10 in (1.78 m)	So	Clackamas High School; Oregon	Happy Valley, OR
F	33	Nihoa Dunn	6 ft 1 in (1.85 m)	Fr	Kamehameha Schools, Kapālama	Honolulu, HI

Head coach

- Karlie Burris (Portland)

Assistant coach(es)

- Kerri Nakamoto (Cal Poly)
- Hailey King (Cal State Fullerton)
- Jodi Page (San José State)

Legend

- (C) Team captain
- (S) Suspended
- (I) Ineligible
- (W) Walk-on
- Injured
- Current redshirt

Roster
Last update: October 2, 2026

== Schedule and results ==
Date time, TV	Rank^{#}	Opponent^{#}	Result	Record	High points	High rebounds	High assists	Site (attendance) city, state
Exhibition
October 27, 2026*; 7:00 p.m.		Warner Pacific	W 111-48		23 – Colvin	14 – Zuniga	7 – Torres-Kahapea	Viking Pavilion (300); Portland, OR
Regular season
November 2, 2026*; 7:00 p.m., ESPN+		Pepperdine	L 43-59	0-1	12 – Colvin	8 – Tied	3 – Colvin	Viking Pavilion (375); Portland, OR
November 6, 2026*; 5:30 p.m., YouTube		at Boise State	L 68-83	0-2	18 – Colvin	8 – Colvin	2 – Tied	ExtraMile Arena (1,773); Boise, ID
November 10, 2026*; 6:00 p.m.		at San Diego						Jenny Craig Pavilion; San Diego, CA
November 12, 2026*; 11:00 a.m.		at UC San Diego						LionTree Arena; La Jolla, CA
November 15, 2026*; 1:00 p.m.		at San Jose State						Provident Credit Union Event Center; San Jose, CA
November 18, 2026*; 6:00 p.m.		at Portland						Chiles Center; Portland, OR
November 24, 2026*; 7:00 p.m.		Cal State Fullerton						Viking Pavilion; Portland, OR
November 28, 2026*; 12:00 p.m.		UC Santa Barbara						Viking Pavilion; Portland, OR
December 3, 2026; 6:00 p.m.		at Eastern Washington						Reese Court; Cheney, WA
December 5, 2026; 2:00 p.m.		at Idaho						ICCU Arena; Moscow, ID
December 13, 2026*; 2:00 p.m.		Western Oregon						Viking Pavilion; Portland, OR
December 15, 2026*; 7:00 p.m.		Willamette						Viking Pavilion; Portland, OR
December 18, 2026*; 2:00 p.m.		at Seattle						Redhawk Center; Seattle, WA
December 20, 2026*; 2:00 p.m.		at Washington						Alaska Airlines Arena; Seattle, WA
December 31, 2026; 2:00 p.m.		Montana State						Viking Pavilion; Portland, OR
January 2, 2027; 2:00 p.m.		Montana						Viking Pavilion; Portland, OR
January 7, 2027; 7:00 p.m.		Utah Tech						Viking Pavilion; Portland, OR
January 9, 2027; 2:00 p.m.		Southern Utah						Viking Pavilion; Portland, OR
January 14, 2027; 5:00 p.m.		at Weber State						Dee Events Center; Ogden, UT
January 16, 2027; 1:00 p.m.		at Idaho State						Reed Gym; Pocatello, ID
January 21, 2027; 1:00 p.m.		at Northern Arizona						Findlay Toyota Court; Flagstaff, AZ
January 25, 2027; 7:00 p.m.		Northern Colorado						Viking Pavilion; Portland, OR
January 28, 2027; 7:00 p.m.		Idaho						Viking Pavilion; Portland, OR
January 30, 2027; 2:00 p.m.		Eastern Washington						Viking Pavilion; Portland, OR
February 4, 2027; 6:00 p.m.		at Montana						Dahlberg Arena; Missoula, MT
February 6, 2027; 1:00 p.m.		at Montana State						Worthington Arena; Bozeman, MT
February 11, 2027; 7:00 p.m.		Idaho State						Viking Pavilion; Portland, OR
February 13, 2027; 1:00 p.m.		Weber State						Viking Pavilion; Portland, OR
February 17, 2027; 5:30 p.m.		at Southern Utah						America First Event Center; Cedar City, UT
February 20, 2027; 12:00 p.m.		at Utah Tech						Burns Arena; St. George, UT
February 22, 2027; 7:00 p.m.		Northern Arizona						Viking Pavilion; Portland, OR
February 27, 2027; 1:00 p.m.		at Northern Colorado						Bank of Colorado Arena; Greeley, CO
Big Sky tournament
March 5–10, 2027; TBA		vs.						Idaho Central Arena; Boise, ID
*Non-conference game. ^{#}Rankings from AP Poll. (#) Tournament seedings in parentheses. All times are in Pacific.
