= 2026–27 New Mexico Lobos women's basketball team =

American college basketball season

2026–27 New Mexico Lobos women's basketball
- Conference: Mountain West Conference
- Record: 1–3 (0–0 MW)
- Head coach: Amy Eagan (1st season)
- Associate head coach: Jordan Mellot
- Assistant coaches: Lindsay Ward; Patrick Harrison; Makayla Wallace; Cydney McHenry; KK Rodriguez
- Home arena: The Pit

2026–27 Mountain West Conference women's basketball standings
	Conf.				Overall
Team	W		L	PCT	W		L	PCT
Grand Canyon	0	–	0	–	3	–	0	1.000
UTEP	0	–	0	–	3	–	1	.750
Air Force	0	–	0	–	2	–	2	.500
UC Davis	0	–	0	–	2	–	2	.500
Wyoming	0	–	0	–	2	–	2	.500
San Jose State	0	–	0	–	1	–	2	.333
UNLV	0	–	0	–	1	–	2	.333
Hawai'i	0	–	0	–	1	–	3	.250
Nevada	0	–	0	–	1	–	3	.250
New Mexico	0	–	0	–	1	–	3	.250
† 2027 Mountain West tournament winner As of November 16, 2026

The 2026–27 New Mexico Lobos women's basketball team will represent the University of New Mexico during the 2026–27 NCAA Division I women's basketball season. The Lobos will be led by 1st year head coach Amy Eagan, and will play their home games at The Pit in Albuquerque, New Mexico, as members of the Mountain West Conference.

== Previous season ==
The Lobos finished the 2025–26 season 22-10, 14-6 in Mountain West play to finish in a tie for 4th place. As the 4 seed in the Mountain West Tournament, they lost to Boise State 61-62 in the quarterfinals, ending the Lobos season.

== Offseason ==
=== Departures ===
New Mexico departures
Name	Num	Pos.	Height	Year	Hometown	Reason for departure
Destinee Hooks	3	G	5'9"	Junior	Indianapolis, IN	Transferred to Texas Tech
Alyssa Hargrove	4	G	5'8"	Senior	Dayton, OH	Graduated
Cacia Antonio	10	G	5'11"	Junior	Luanda, Angola	Transferred to Eastern New Mexico (D-II)
Nayli Padilla	11	G	5'9"	Sophomore	Santa Cruz de Tenerife, Spain	Transferred to San Diego State
Joana Magalhães	13	G	5'5"	Sophomore	Lisbon, Portugal	Transferred to Santa Clara
Tyler Jones	20	G	5'9"	Freshman	Memphis, TN	Transferred to UT Martin
Emma Najjuma	23	F	6'4"	(redshirt) Sophomore	Mukono, Uganda	Transferred to Santa Clara
Jessie Joaquim	24	F	6'2"	Junior	Maputo, Mozambique	Transferred to Akron
Clarissa Craig	40	F/C	6'3"	(redshirt) Senior	Cincinnati, OH	Graduated

=== Incoming transfers ===
New Mexico incoming transfers
Name	Num	Pos.	Height	Year	Hometown	Previous school
Keiara Curtis	0	G	5'8"	Sophomore	Seattle, WA	Hawaii
Valerie Norwood	1	G	5'8"	Sophomore	Wellington, KS	Lindenwood
Katie Duncan	4	G	5'8"	Junior	Perth, Australia	Hutchinson CC
Brynn Eshoo	6	F	6'2"	Junior	Inverness, IL	Tulsa
Mila Reynolds	7	F	6'3"	Graduate Student	South Bend, IN	UT Arlington
Gracy Wernli	22	G	5'9"	Senior	Bixby, OK	Lindenwood
Gracie Kelsey	33	F	6'2"	Senior	Agency, MO	Lindenwood

==== Recruiting ====
There was no recruiting class of 2026.

== Roster ==
2026–27 New Mexico Lobos women's basketball team
Players
Coaches

Pos.	#	Name	Height	Year	Previous school	Hometown
G	0	Keiara Curtis	5 ft 8 in (1.73 m)	So	Hawai'i	Seattle, Washington
G	1	Valerie Norwood	5 ft 8 in (1.73 m)	So	Lindenwood	Wellington, Kansas
G	2	Maya Thompson	5 ft 11 in (1.8 m)	Fr	Emerson High School	Dallas, Texas
G	3	Quintilla Hidalgo	5 ft 9 in (1.75 m)	Fr	Calandlyceum	Almere, Netherlands
G	4	Katie Duncan	5 ft 8 in (1.73 m)	Jr	Hutchinson Community College	Perth, Australia
G	5	Kaia Foster	6 ft 2 in (1.88 m)	So	Chiawana High School	Pasco, Washington
F	6	Brynn Eshoo	6 ft 2 in (1.88 m)	Jr	Tulsa	Inverness, Illinois
F	7	Mila Reynolds	6 ft 3 in (1.91 m)	GS	UT Arlington	South Bend, Indiana
G	11	Kate Wernli	5 ft 9 in (1.75 m)	Fr	Bixby High School	Bixby, Oklahoma
F	14	Leonor Peixinho	6 ft 1 in (1.85 m)	So	Escola Secundária Dom Pedro V	Lagoa, Portugal
G	15	Drew Jordon	5 ft 11 in (1.8 m)	Sr	Wagner	Washington D.C.
G	22	Gracy Wernli	5 ft 9 in (1.75 m)	Sr	Lindenwood	Bixby, Oklahoma
G	32	Savannah Stricker	5 ft 10 in (1.78 m)	Fr	Incarnate Word Academy	St. Louis, Missouri
F	33	Gracie Kelsey	6 ft 2 in (1.88 m)	Sr	Lindenwood	Agency, Missouri
PG	44	Laila Abdurraqib	5 ft 6 in (1.68 m)	So	Lawrence Central High School	Fishers, Indiana

Head coach

- Amy Eagan (Truman State)

Assistant coach(es)

- Jordan Mellott (Benedictine (KS))
- Lindsay Ward (Lindenwood)
- Patrick Harrison (Wichita State University)
- Makayla Wallace (Lindenwood)
- Cydney McHenry (Adams State)
- KK Rodriguez (SIU Edwardsville)

Legend

- (C) Team captain
- (S) Suspended
- (I) Ineligible
- (W) Walk-on
- Injured
- Current redshirt

Roster
Last update: July 10, 2026

== Schedule and results ==
Date time, TV	Rank^{#}	Opponent^{#}	Result	Record	High points	High rebounds	High assists	Site (attendance) city, state
Exhibition
October 26, 2026*; 6:00 p.m.		MSU Denver	W 93–59	–	18 – Duncan	7 – Thompson	4 – Tied	The Pit (3,841); Albuquerque, NM
Non-conference regular season
November 2, 2026*; 11:00 a.m., MW+		Seattle	L 62–63	0–1	20 – Abdurraqib	10 – Abdurraqib	5 – Stricker	The Pit (6,981); Albuquerque, NM
November 6, 2026*; 7:00 p.m., MW+		New Mexico Highlands	W 68–39	1–1	15 – Abdurraqib	7 – Tied	3 – Reynolds	The Pit (4,201); Albuquerque, NM
November 11, 2026*; 7:30 p.m., YouTube		at Fresno State	L 56–74	1–2	17 – Abdurraqib	6 – Abdurraqib	2 – Tied	Save Mart Center (1,109); Fresno, CA
November 14, 2026*; 2:00 p.m., ESPN+		at BYU	L 65–82	1–3	15 – Curtis	4 – Tied	6 – Abdurraqib	Marriott Center (1,701); Provo, UT
November 18, 2026*; 7:00 p.m., MW+		Colorado						The Pit; Albuquerque, NM
November 21, 2026*; 1:00 p.m., MW+		New Mexico State; Rio Grande Rivalry						The Pit; Albuquerque, NM
November 24, 2026*; 7:00 p.m., MW+		Eastern Kentucky						The Pit; Albuquerque, NM
December 2, 2026*; 7:00 p.m., MW+		Loyola Marymount						The Pit; Albuquerque, NM
December 5, 2026*; 8:30 p.m., The CW		Arizona						The Pit; Albuquerque, NM
December 18, 2026*; 7:00 p.m., MW+		UC Irvine						The Pit; Albuquerque, NM
November 21, 2026*; 12:00 p.m., MW+		Portland						The Pit; Albuquerque, NM
Mountain West regular season
December 30, 2026; 7:00 p.m., ESPN App		UTEP						The Pit; Albuquerque, NM
January 2, 2027; 1:00 p.m., MW+		San Jose State						The Pit; Albuquerque, NM
January 6, 2027; TBA		at Grand Canyon						Global Credit Union Arena; Phoenix, AZ
January 9, 2027; 8:00 p.m., MW+		Nevada						The Pit; Albuquerque, NM
January 13, 2027; TBA, MW+		at Hawaii						Stan Sheriff Center; Honolulu, HI
January 16, 2027; 6:00 p.m., ESPN App		UNLV						The Pit; Albuquerque, NM
January 20, 2027; 8:00 p.m., MW+		at San Jose State						Provident Credit Union Event Center; San Jose, CA
January 23, 2027; 2:00 p.m., MW+		at Wyoming						Arena-Auditorium; Laramie, WY
January 27, 2027; 7:00 p.m., MW+		UC Davis						The Pit; Albuquerque, NM
January 30, 2027; TBA, MW+		at Air Force						Clune Arena; Colorado Springs, CO
February 3, 2027; 7:00 p.m., MW+		Hawaii						The Pit; Albuquerque, NM
February 6, 2027; 1:00 p.m., ESPN App		Grand Canyon						The Pit; Albuquerque, NM
February 13, 2027; 8:00 p.m., The CW		at UNLV						Cox Pavilion; Paradise, NV
February 17, 2027; 7:00 p.m., ESPN App		Wyoming						The Pit; Albuquerque, NM
February 20, 2027; 5:00 p.m., MW+		at UC Davis						University Credit Union Center; Davis, CA
February 24, 2027; TBA, MW+		at Nevada						Lawlor Events Center; Reno, NV
February 27, 2027; 1:00 p.m., MW+		Air Force						The Pit; Albuquerque, NM
March 2, 2027; TBA, MW+		at UTEP						Don Haskins Center; El Paso, TX
Mountain West tournament
March 7–10, 2027; TBA		vs.						Thomas & Mack Center; Paradise, NV
*Non-conference game. ^{#}Rankings from AP Poll. (#) Tournament seedings in parentheses. All times are in Mountain.
