= 2026–27 Wyoming Cowgirls basketball team =

American college basketball season

2026–27 Wyoming Cowgirls basketball
- Conference: Mountain West Conference
- Record: 2–2 (0-0 MW)
- Head coach: Heather Ezell (5th season)
- Assistant coaches: Candace Thornton; Natalie Baker; Taylor Ignoto; Hilary Baker
- Home arena: Arena-Auditorium

2026–27 Mountain West Conference women's basketball standings
	Conf.				Overall
Team	W		L	PCT	W		L	PCT
Grand Canyon	0	–	0	–	3	–	0	1.000
UTEP	0	–	0	–	3	–	1	.750
Air Force	0	–	0	–	2	–	2	.500
UC Davis	0	–	0	–	2	–	2	.500
Wyoming	0	–	0	–	2	–	2	.500
Hawai'i	0	–	0	–	1	–	2	.333
UNLV	0	–	0	–	1	–	2	.333
Nevada	0	–	0	–	1	–	3	.250
New Mexico	0	–	0	–	1	–	3	.250
San Jose State	0	–	0	–	0	–	2	.000
† 2027 Mountain West tournament winner As of November 15, 2026

The 2026–27 Wyoming Cowgirls basketball team represents the University of Wyoming during the 2026–27 NCAA Division I women's basketball season. The Cowgirls, led by fifth-year head coach Heather Ezell, play their home games at the Arena-Auditorium in Laramie, Wyoming, as members of the Mountain West Conference.

== Previous season ==
The Cowgirls finished the 2025–26 season 10–20, 7–13 in Mountain West play, to finish in a tie for eighth place. As an No. 8 seed in the Mountain West tournament where they lost in the first round to Air Force.

== Offseason ==
=== Departures ===
Wyoming departures
Name	Num	Pos.	Height	Year	Hometown	Reason for departure
Logann Alvar	1	F	6'0"	Senior	Casper, WY	Graduated; transferred
Aurore Eyango	6	G	5'9"	Senior	Lille, France	Graduated; transferred
Lana Beslic	10	G	5'8"	Sophomore	Split, Croatia	Transferred to Wagner
Madi Symons	11	F	6'0"	Junior	Coeur d'Alene, ID	Transferred
Malene Pedersen	12	G	5'11"	Senior	Aabyhøj, Denmark	Graduated
Karoline Lundin	13	G/F	5'11"	Sophomore	Copenhagen, Denmark	No longer on team roster
Heidur Karlsdottir	15	F/C	6'4"	Sophomore	Reykholt, Iceland	Transferred to Colorado State
Mikyn Hamlin	25	G	5'8"	Junior	Hugoton, KS	TBD
Henna Sandvik	26	G	6'0"	Senior	Helsinki, Finland	Graduated

=== Incoming transfers ===
Wyoming incoming transfers
Name	Num	Pos.	Height	Year	Hometown	Previous school
Ophelia Powell	0	G	5'9"	Sophomore	Melbourne, Australia	Cal State Bakersfield
Merceius Mili	23	G/F	6'1"	Sophomore	Lehi, UT	Utah Tech
Jersey Berg	24	F	5'11"	Junior	Aurora, CO	Williston State College
Norah Clark	25	F	6'1"	Senior	Springfield, MO	UT Martin
Hayley Johnson	27	F/C	6'2"	Junior	Sunnyvale, CA	San Jose City College
Kaylan Deveney	44	C	6'3"	Senior	Medford, NJ	Rider

=== Recruiting class ===
There was no 2026 recruiting class.

== Roster ==
2026–27 Wyoming Cowgirls women's basketball team
Players
Coaches

Pos.	#	Name	Height	Year	Previous school	Hometown
G	0	Ophelia Powell	5 ft 9 in (1.75 m)	So	Cal State Bakersfield	Melbourne, Australia
G	1	Zoey Blackwell	5 ft 8 in (1.73 m)	Fr	Middleton High School	Caldwell, Idaho
F	2	Jane Rumpf	6 ft 2 in (1.88 m)	So	Regis Jesuit High School	Denver, Colorado
G	3	Payton Muma	5 ft 8 in (1.73 m)	RS Sr	Gonzaga	Highlands Ranch, Colorado
G	4	Karly Davis	5 ft 7 in (1.7 m)	Fr	Buffalo High School	Buffalo, Wyoming
F/C	5	Liv Blomkvist	6 ft 4 in (1.93 m)	So	RIG Luleå	Stockholm, Sweden
G	6	Taylor Donaldson	6 ft 0 in (1.83 m)	Fr	South Albany High School	Albany, Oregon
G	14	Kati Ollilainen	5 ft 9 in (1.75 m)	RS Jr	HBA-Märsky	Helsinki, Finland
G	21	Katie Harrington	6 ft 0 in (1.83 m)	So	ATC Academy	Melbourne, Australia
F	22	Peyton Wohlford	6 ft 2 in (1.88 m)	So	Smithville High School	Smithville, Missouri
G/F	23	Merceius Mili	6 ft 1 in (1.85 m)	Fr	Utah Tech	Lehi, Utah
G/F	24	Jersey Berg	5 ft 11 in (1.8 m)	Jr	Williston State College	Bismarck, North Dakota
F	25	Norah Clark	6 ft 1 in (1.85 m)	Sr	UT Martin	Springfield, Missouri
F	27	Hayley Johnson	6 ft 2 in (1.88 m)	Jr	San Jose City College	Sunnyvale, California
C	44	Kaylan Deveney	6 ft 3 in (1.91 m)	Sr	Rider	Medford, New Jersey

Head coach

- Heather Ezell (Iowa State)

Assistant coach(es)

- Candace Thornton (Colorado–Colorado Springs)
- Natalie Baker (Wyoming)
- Taylor Ignoto (Washburn)
- Hillary Baker (Wyoming)

Legend

- (C) Team captain
- (S) Suspended
- (I) Ineligible
- (W) Walk-on
- Injured
- Current redshirt

Roster
Last update: January 22, 2026

== Schedule and results ==
Date time, TV	Rank^{#}	Opponent^{#}	Result	Record	High points	High rebounds	High assists	Site (attendance) city, state
Exhibition
October 26, 2026*; 6:30 p.m.		Colorado Christian	W 75-50		–	–	–	Arena-Auditorium; Laramie, WY
October 30, 2026*; 6:00 p.m.		South Dakota Mines	W 65-60		–	–	–	Arena-Auditorium; Laramie, WY
Non-conference regular season
November 2, 2026*; 6:30 p.m., MW+		Santa Clara	L 50-84	0-1	16 – Clark	7 – Clark	2 – Blomkvist	Arena-Auditorium (1,824); Laramie, WY
November 7, 2026*; 7:00 p.m., MW+		Missouri State	L 37-72	0-2	17 – Ollilainen	5 – Johnson	3 – Donaldson	Arena-Auditorium (1,879); Laramie, WY
November 10, 2026*; 6:30 p.m., MW+		UT Arlington	W 75-64	1-2	28 – Clark	7 – Wohlford	5 – Ollilainen	Arena-Auditorium (1,721); Laramie, WY
November 13, 2026*; 6:30 p.m., YouTube		at Colorado State; Border War	W 58-55	2-2	26 – Clark	13 – Blomkvist	3 – Tied	Moby Arena (2,019); Fort Collins, CO
November 18, 2026*; 6:00 p.m.		at South Dakota State						First Bank and Trust Arena; Brookings, SD
November 22, 2026*; 2:00 p.m., MW+		Harvard						Arena-Auditorium; Laramie, WY
November 27, 2026*; 5:30 p.m.		vs. Utah State; ZotGiving Classic						Bren Events Center; Irvine, CA
November 28, 2026*; 3:00 p.m.		vs. Jacksonville State; ZotGiving Classic						Bren Events Center; Irvine, CA
December 2, 2026*; 11:00 a.m., MW+		Regis						Arena-Auditorium; Laramie, WY
December 6, 2026*; 1:00 p.m., ESPN+		at Colorado						CU Events Center; Boulder, CO
December 12, 2026*; 1:00 p.m., MW+		Idaho						Arena-Auditorium; Laramie, WY
December 19, 2026*; 3:00 p.m.		at Portland						Chiles Center; Portland, OR
December 22, 2026*; 1:00 p.m.		at Denver						Hamilton Gymnasium; Denver, CO
Mountain West regular season
December 30, 2026; 6:30 p.m., MW+		at Air Force						Clune Arena; Colorado Springs, CO
January 2, 2027; 2:00 p.m., MW+		at Nevada						Lawlor Events Center; Reno, NV
January 6, 2027; 6:30 p.m., MW+		Hawaii						Arena-Auditorium; Laramie, WY
January 9, 2027; 2:00 p.m., MW+		UNLV						Arena-Auditorium; Laramie, WY
January 13, 2027; 7:00 p.m., MW+		at UC Davis						University Credit Union Center; Davis, CA
January 16, 2027; 1:00 p.m., MW+		at Grand Canyon						Global Credit Union Arena; Phoenix, AZ
January 20, 2027; 6:30 p.m., MW+		UTEP						Arena-Auditorium; Laramie, WY
January 23, 2027; 2:00 p.m., MW+		New Mexico						Arena-Auditorium; Laramie, WY
January 27, 2027; 8:00 p.m., MW+		at San Jose State						Provident Credit Union Event Center; San Jose, CA
January 30, 2027; 3:00 p.m., MW+		at UNLV						Cox Pavilion; Paradise, NV
February 3, 2027; 6:30 p.m., MW+		Nevada						Arena-Auditorium; Laramie, WY
February 6, 2027; 2:00 p.m., MW+		UC Davis						Arena-Auditorium; Laramie, WY
February 13, 2027; TBA, MW+		at UTEP						Don Haskins Center; El Paso, TX
February 17, 2027; 7:00 p.m.		at New Mexico						The Pit; Albuquerque, NM
February 20, 2027; 2:00 p.m.		Air Force						Arena-Auditorium; Laramie, WY
February 24, 2027; TBA, MW+		at Hawaii						Stan Sheriff Center; Honolulu, HI
February 27, 2027; 7:00 p.m., MW+		Grand Canyon						Arena-Auditorium; Laramie, WY
March 2, 2027; 6:30 p.m., MW+		San Jose State						Arena-Auditorium; Laramie, WY
Mountain West tournament
March 7–10, 2027; TBA		vs.						Thomas & Mack Center; Paradise, NV
*Non-conference game. ^{#}Rankings from AP Poll. (#) Tournament seedings in parentheses. All times are in Mountain.
