= 2026–27 Idaho Vandals women's basketball team =

American college basketball season

2026–27 Idaho Vandals women's basketball
- Conference: Big Sky Conference
- Record: 3–1 (0–0 Big Sky)
- Head coach: Arthur Moreira (3rd season)
- Associate head coach: Drew Muscatell
- Assistant coaches: Brianna Chambers; Skyler Young; Erin O'Bryan
- Home arena: ICCU Arena

2026–27 Big Sky women's basketball standings
	Conf.				Overall
Team	W		L	PCT	W		L	PCT
Weber State	0	–	0	–	3	–	0	1.000
Montana State	0	–	0	–	2	–	0	1.000
Idaho State	0	–	0	–	4	–	1	.800
Northern Colorado	0	–	0	–	3	–	1	.750
Idaho	0	–	0	–	3	–	1	.750
Eastern Washington	0	–	0	–	2	–	2	.500
Southern Utah	0	–	0	–	2	–	2	.500
Utah Tech	0	–	0	–	2	–	2	.500
Montana	0	–	0	–	1	–	3	.250
Northern Arizona	0	–	0	–	0	–	3	.000
Portland State	0	–	0	–	0	–	5	.000
† 2027 Big Sky tournament winner As of 16 November 202600

The 2026–27 Idaho Vandals women's basketball team currently represents the University of Idaho during the 2026–27 NCAA Division I women's basketball season. The Vandals, led by third-year head coach Arthur Moreira, play their home games at the Idaho Central Credit Union Arena in Moscow, Idaho, and compete as a member of the Big Sky Conference.

== Previous season ==
The Vandals finished the 2025–26 season finished the season a program-best 29–6 overall and 17–1 in Big Sky play, to finish as regular season champions for the first time since 2019. The team's only conference loss came on January 10, when they lost 66–99 to Montana State on the road.

As the top seed in the Big Sky tournament, they defeated No. 9 Weber State 66–52 and No. 5 Sacramento State 59–51 in the quarterfinals and semifinals respectively to advance to the championship game. The Vandals went on to defeat No. 2 Montana State 60–57 to capture the Big Sky title and earn the conference's automatic bid to the NCAA tournament, both for the first time since 2016.

In the tournament, the Vandals were seeded No. 13 in the Sacramento #4 Regional. They lost 59–89 to No. 4 seeded Oklahoma in the first round to end their season.

== Offseason ==
=== Departures ===
Idaho Departures
Name	Number	Pos.	Height	Year	Hometown	Reason for departure
Sarah Brans	2	Forward	6'1"	Senior	Dublin, CA	Graduated
Kyra Gardner	3	Guard	5'11"	Senior	Raymond, WA	Graduated
Sofia Ekh	6	Guard	5'9"	Freshman	Västerås, Sweden	Transferred to Charleston Southern
Debra dos Santos	9	Forward	6'0"	5th Year	Rio de Janeiro, Brazil	Exhausted eligibility
Lorena Barbosa	10	Forward	6'5"	5th Year	Itatiba, Brazil	Exhausted eligibility
Anja Bukvic	12	Guard	5'10"	Senior	Belgrade, Serbia	Graduated, transferred to Northeastern
Catelyn Deaver	13	Forward	6'0"	Senior	Sumner, WA	Graduated
Niveya Henley	21	Guard	6'0"	5th Year	Seattle, WA	Exhausted eligibility
Mary McMorris	24	Guard	5'6"	Senior	Las Vegas, NV	Graduated

=== Incoming transfers ===
Idaho Incoming Transfers
Name	Number	Pos.	Height	Year	Hometown	Previous school
Keanna Salave'a	8	Forward	6'2"	Senior	Vancouver, WA	Sacramento State
Alexia Dagba	12	Forward	6'1"	Junior	Recife, Brazil	Georgetown
Fatumata Djalo	13	Guard	5'9"	Junior	Aveiro, Portugal	Monmouth
Aniyah Riddell	24	Forward	6'0"	Junior	Phoenix, AZ	Central Arizona College (NJCAA)
Brynna Pukis	32	Guard	5'6"	Sophomore	Snohomish, WA	Long Beach State

=== Recruiting class ===
There was no 2026 recruiting class.

== Roster ==
2026–27 Idaho Vandals women's basketball team
Players
Coaches

Pos.	#	Name	Height	Year	Previous school	Hometown
F	1	Reese de Groot	5 ft 11 in (1.8 m)	So	Clarkston High School	Lewiston, ID
G	3	Addison Wells-Morrison	6 ft 0 in (1.83 m)	Fr	Mead High School	Spokane, WA
G	4	Hope Hassmann	5 ft 8 in (1.73 m)	Jr	Tahoma High School; Cal State Fullerton	Maple Valley, WA
G	5	Ella Uriarte	5 ft 8 in (1.73 m)	Jr	Folsom High School	Folsom, CA
F	8	Keanna Salave'a	6 ft 2 in (1.88 m)	Sr	Heritage High School; Sacramento State	Vancouver, WA
G	10	Jacey Boesel	5 ft 6 in (1.68 m)	Fr	Deer Park High School	Deer Park, WA
G	11	Bailey Nettleton	5 ft 9 in (1.75 m)	Fr	Tahoma High School	Maple Valley, WA
F	12	Alexia Dagba	6 ft 1 in (1.85 m)	Jr	Colégio Santa Emília; Georgetown	Recife, Brazil
G	13	Fatumata Djalo	5 ft 9 in (1.75 m)	Fr	Jaime Magalhães Lima; Monmouth	Aveiro, Portugal
G	14	Katlin Kangur	5 ft 7 in (1.7 m)	So	TSA/CITYTEED Tallinn	Tallinn, Estonia
G	23	Ana Beatriz Passos Alves da Silva	5 ft 11 in (1.8 m)	Jr	Brazil U19 national team	São Paulo, Brazil
F	24	Aniyah Riddell	6 ft 0 in (1.83 m)	Jr	Desert Vista High School; Central Arizona College	Phoenix, AZ
G	32	Brynna Pukis	5 ft 6 in (1.68 m)	So	Glacier Peak High School; Long Beach State	Snohomish, WA
G	37	Ana Pinheiro	6 ft 0 in (1.83 m)	Jr	Portugal U18 national team	Braga, Portugal

Head coach

- Arthur Moreira (Sonoma State)

Assistant coach(es)

- Drew Muscatell (Oregon)
- Brianna Chambers (Cal State Bakersfield)
- Skyler Young (Western Michigan)
- Erin O'Bryan (Arizona)

Legend

- (C) Team captain
- (S) Suspended
- (I) Ineligible
- (W) Walk-on
- Injured
- Current redshirt

Roster
Last update: September 30, 2026

== Schedule and results ==
Date time, TV	Rank^{#}	Opponent^{#}	Result	Record	High points	High rebounds	High assists	Site (attendance) city, state
Exhibition
October 18, 2026*; 2:00 p.m.		at Utah	W 78–62		24 – Hassmann	18 – Salave'a	7 – Hassmann	Jon M. Huntsman Center (267); Salt Lake City, UT
Regular season
November 2, 2026*; 11:00 a.m., ESPN+		Saint Martin's	W 71–47	1–0	12 – Uriarte	9 – Salave'a	2 – Tied	ICCU Arena (2,591); Moscow, ID
November 6, 2026*; 6:00 p.m., YouTube		at Gonzaga	W 86–75	2–0	28 – Hassmann	14 – Salave'a	4 – Hassmann	McCarthey Athletic Center (4,939); Spokane, WA
November 9, 2026*; 11:00 a.m., YouTube		at Washington State; Battle of the Palouse	L 53–76	2–1	15 – Hassmann	12 – Salave'a	3 – Uriarte	Beasley Coliseum (2,082); Pullman, WA
November 15, 2026*; 2:00 p.m., ESPN+		Walla Walla	W 109–40	3–1	21 – Pukis	9 – Riddell	11 – Uriarte	ICCU Arena (1,208); Moscow, ID
November 20, 2026*; 6:00 p.m.		at Nevada						Lawlor Events Center; Reno, NV
November 22, 2026*; 2:00 p.m.		Northwest Indian College						ICCU Arena; Moscow, ID
November 27, 2026*; 12:00 p.m.		at California Baptist; CBU Classic						Fowler Events Center; Riverside, CA
November 28, 2026*; 2:30 p.m.		vs. Cal State Northridge; CBU Classic						Fowler Events Center; Riverside, CA
December 3, 2026; 6:00 p.m.		Northern Colorado						ICCU Arena; Moscow, ID
December 5, 2026; 2:00 p.m.		Portland State						ICCU Arena; Moscow, ID
December 9, 2026*; 6:00 p.m., ESPN+		at Long Beach State						LBS Financial Credit Union Pyramid; Long Beach, CA
December 12, 2026*; 1:00 p.m.		at Wyoming						Arena-Auditorium; Laramie, WY
December 16, 2026*; 6:00 p.m.		Utah State						ICCU Arena; Moscow, ID
December 31, 2026; 1:00 p.m.		at Utah Tech						Burns Arena; St. George, UT
January 2, 2027; 1:00 p.m.		at Southern Utah						America First Event Center; Cedar City, UT
January 9, 2027; 1:00 p.m.		at Northern Arizona						Rolle Activity Center; Flagstaff, AZ
January 14, 2027; 6:00 p.m.		Montana						ICCU Arena; Moscow, ID
January 16, 2027; 1:00 p.m.		Montana State						ICCU Arena; Moscow, ID
January 18, 2027; 6:00 p.m.		Weber State						ICCU Arena; Moscow, ID
January 23, 2027; 2:00 p.m.		at Eastern Washington						Reese Court; Cheney, WA
January 25, 2027; 6:00 p.m.		at Idaho State						Reed Gym; Pocatello, ID
January 28, 2027; 7:00 p.m.		at Portland State						Viking Pavilion; Portland, OR
January 30, 2027; 1:00 p.m.		at Northern Colorado						Bank of Colorado Arena; Greeley, CO
February 4, 2027; 6:00 p.m.		Southern Utah						ICCU Arena; Moscow, ID
February 6, 2027; 2:00 p.m.		Utah Tech						ICCU Arena; Moscow, ID
February 11, 2027; 6:00 p.m.		at Montana State						Worthington Arena; Bozeman, MT
February 13, 2027; 1:00 p.m.		at Montana						Dahlberg Arena; Missoula, MT
February 18, 2027; 6:00 p.m.		Northern Arizona						ICCU Arena; Moscow, ID
February 22, 2027; 5:00 p.m., ESPN+		at Weber State						Dee Events Center; Ogden, UT
February 27, 2027; 2:00 p.m.		Eastern Washington						ICCU Arena; Moscow, ID
March 1, 2027; 6:00 p.m.		Idaho State						ICCU Arena; Moscow, ID
Big Sky tournament
March 5–10, 2027; TBA		vs.						Idaho Central Arena; Boise, ID
*Non-conference game. ^{#}Rankings from AP Poll. (#) Tournament seedings in parentheses. All times are in Pacific.
