= Nevada Wolf Pack women's basketball =

| 2026–27 Nevada Wolf Pack women's basketball team |
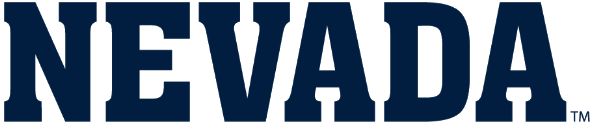
- University: University of Nevada, Reno
- Head coach: Kelly Sopak (1st season)
- Location: Reno, Nevada
- Arena: Lawlor Events Center (capacity: 11,784)
- Conference: Mountain West
- Nickname: Wolf Pack
- Colors: Navy blue and silver

Uniforms
| Home | Away | Alternate |

The Nevada Wolf Pack women's basketball program is a college basketball team that represents the University of Nevada, Reno. The team is currently a member of the Mountain West Conference, which is a Division I conference in the National Collegiate Athletic Association (NCAA).

== History ==
Though the Wolf Pack began play in 1899, record were not accurately kept up to date until the 1981–82 season, considered by the school to be the first for the program. They played in the West Coast Athletic Conference from 1985 to 1987, the Mountain West from 1987–88, the Big Sky Conference from 1988–1992, the Big West Conference from 1992–2000, and the Western Athletic Conference from 2000–2012 before joining the Mountain West Conference in 2012. they made the WNIT in 2007 and 2011, winning their First Round game in the latter year against St. Mary's 65–62 but losing in the Second Round to USC 78–59. As of the end of the 2015–16 season, they have a 363–583 all-time record.

| Season | Coach | Record | Conference Record |
|---|---|---|---|
| 1981–82 | Julie Hickey | 12–15 | n/a |
| 1982–83 | Julie Hickey | 8–18 | n/a |
| 1983–84 | Chuck Ayers | 8–18 | n/a |
| 1984–85 | Anne Hope | 9–15 | n/a |
| 1985–86 | Anne Hope | 17–8 | 7–5 |
| 1986–87 | Anne Hope | 9–19 | 4–8 |
| 1987–88 | Anne Hope | 9–18 | 2–14 |
| 1988–89 | Chickie Mason | 2–25 | 0–16 |
| 1989–90 | Chickie Mason | 6–21 | 2–14 |
| 1990–91 | Tommy Gates | 5–22 | 3–13 |
| 1991–92 | Tommy Gates | 8–18 | 5–11 |
| 1992–93 | Tommy Gates | 4–22 | 4–13 |
| 1993–94 | Ada Gee | 3–24 | 0–18 |
| 1994–95 | Ada Gee | 10–18 | 6–12 |
| 1995–96 | Ada Gee | 9–17 | 6–12 |
| 1996–97 | Ada Gee | 13–13 | 9–5 |
| 1997–98 | Ada Gee | 19–9 | 10–4 |
| 1998–99 | Ada Gee | 9–19 | 4–10 |
| 1999-00 | Ada Gee | 19–10 | 8–6 |
| 2000–01 | Ada Gee | 16–13 | 9–7 |
| 2001–02 | Ada Gee | 9–19 | 6–12 |
| 2002–03 | Ada Gee | 10–19 | 3–15 |
| 2003–04 | Kim Gervasoni | 3–26 | 2–16 |
| 2004–05 | Kim Gervasoni | 8–22 | 3–15 |
| 2005–06 | Kim Gervasoni | 13–17 | 8–8 |
| 2006–07 | Kim Gervasoni | 17–15 | 10–6 |
| 2007–08 | Kim Gervasoni | 18–12 | 9–7 |
| 2008–09 | Jane Albright | 18–14 | 10–6 |
| 2009–10 | Jane Albright | 17–16 | 10–6 |
| 2010–11 | Jane Albright | 22–11 | 9–7 |
| 2011–12 | Jane Albright | 7–23 | 3–11 |
| 2012–13 | Jane Albright | 8–23 | 2–14 |
| 2013–14 | Jane Albright | 18–13 | 12–6 |
| 2014–15 | Jane Albright | 9–21 | 5–13 |
| 2015–16 | Jane Albright | 5–25 | 4–14 |
| 2016-17 | Jane Albright | 11-19 | 5-14 |
| 2017-18 | Amanda Levens | 19–17 | 7–11 |
