= Weber State Wildcats women's basketball =

Weber State Wildcats
| 2024–25 Weber State Wildcats women's basketball team |
- University: Weber State University
- First season: 1974–75
- Head coach: Jenteal Jackson (2nd season)
- Conference: Big Sky
- Location: Ogden, Utah
- Arena: Dee Events Center (capacity: 11,500)
- Nickname: Wildcats
- Colors: Purple and white

Uniforms
| Home | Away | Alternate |

NCAA tournament appearances
- 2002, 2003

Conference tournament champions
- 2002, 2003

Conference regular-season champions
- 2002, 2003

The Weber State Wildcats women's basketball team is the basketball team representing Weber State University in Ogden, Utah. The program is classified in the NCAA's Division I and is a member of the Big Sky Conference.

== History ==
Weber State began play in 1974. They played in the Intermountain from 1974 to 1980. They won the Big Sky regular season and tournament in 2002 and 2003. The Wildcats lost 51 consecutive Big Sky conference games from March 3, 2011 until February 15, 2014, when they beat Idaho State two days later. In that time, they had two winless conference seasons (including a 0–29 season in 2012–13). They made the WNIT in 1983 and the WBI in 2016. As of the end of the 2015–16 season, the Wildcats have an all-time record of 535–640.

== NCAA tournament results ==
| Year | Seed | Round | Opponent | Result |
|---|---|---|---|---|
| 2002 | #15 | First Round | #2 Stanford | L 51−76 |
| 2003 | #13 | First Round | #4 Ohio State | L 44−66 |
