= 2026–27 San Diego State Aztecs women's basketball team =

American college basketball season

2026–27 San Diego State Aztecs women's basketball
- Conference: Pac-12 Conference
- Record: 3–1 (0–0 Pac-12)
- Head coach: Stacie Terry-Hutson (14th season)
- Associate head coach: Kellie Lewis
- Assistant coaches: Gregg Gottlieb; Mel Boscarino; Justin Hutson; John Smith
- Home arena: Viejas Arena

2026–27 Pac-12 Conference women's basketball standings
	Conf.				Overall
Team	W		L	PCT	W		L	PCT
Texas State	0	–	0	–	4	–	0	1.000
Boise State	0	–	0	–	4	–	1	.800
Fresno State	0	–	0	–	3	–	1	.750
San Diego State	0	–	0	–	3	–	1	.750
Oregon State	0	–	0	–	3	–	2	.600
Gonzaga	0	–	0	–	3	–	3	.500
Colorado State	0	–	0	–	2	–	2	.500
Washington State	0	–	0	–	2	–	3	.400
Utah State	0	–	0	–	2	–	4	.333
† 2027 Pac-12 Tournament winner As of November 19, 2026; Rankings from AP poll

The 2026–27 San Diego State Aztecs women's basketball team represents San Diego State University during the 2026–27 NCAA Division I women's basketball season. The Aztecs, led by fourteenth-year head coach Stacie Terry-Hutson, play their home games at Viejas Arena in San Diego, California as newly members of the Pac-12 Conference.

== Previous season ==
The Aztecs finished the 2025–26 season 27–6, 19–1 in Mountain West play, to win the regular season title. As a No. 1 seed in the Mountain West tournament, they lost in the quarterfinals to Air Force. They received an automatic bid to the WBIT as a No. 4 seed in the Texas A&M bracket, where they defeated UC Irvine and McNeese in the first round and second rounds before losing in the quarterfinals to Kansas.

This is San Diego State's last season as members of the Mountain West Conference, as they will join the newly reformed Pac-12 Conference, effective July 1, 2026.

== Offseason ==
=== Departures ===
San Diego State departures
Name	Num	Pos.	Height	Year	Hometown	Reason for departure
Kendall Mosley	1	G	5'11"	Freshman	Prosper, TX	Transferred to North Texas
CJ Latta	4	G	5'10"	Sophomore	Paul, ID	Transferred to Boise State
Sofia Kelemeni	6	G/F	6'0"	Senior	Kavala, Greece	Graduated
Aubrey Cook	8	C	6'4"	Freshman	Parker, CO	Transferred to Utah Tech
Kaelyn Hamilton	12	G	5'9"	Sophomore	McKinney, TX	Transferred to Houston
Nala Williams	14	G	5'8"	Senior	Long Beach, CA	Graduated

=== Incoming ===
San Diego State incoming transfers
Name	Num	Pos.	Height	Year	Hometown	Previous school
Alayna Kraus	1	G	5'8"	Junior	Okawville, IL	Southern Illinois
Eva DeChent	21	G	5'11"	Senior	Putnam Valley, NY	New Hamsphire
Nayli Padilla	77	G	5'9"	Junior	Santa Cruz de Tenerife, Spain	New Mexico

==== Recruiting ====
There was no recruiting class of 2026.

== Roster ==
2026–27 San Diego State Aztecs women's basketball team
Players
Coaches

Pos.	#	Name	Height	Year	Previous school	Hometown
F	0	Kennedy Lee	6 ft 0 in (1.83 m)	Sr	Centennial High School; Nevada	Louisville, KY
G	1	Alayna Kraus	5 ft 8 in (1.73 m)	Jr	Okawville High School; Southern Illinois	Okawville, IL
G	2	Ellie Chen	5 ft 5 in (1.65 m)	Sr	La Salle College Prep	South Pasadena, CA
G	3	Alyssa Jackson	5 ft 11 in (1.8 m)	Jr	Vanden High School	Fairfield, CA
G	10	Nat Martinez	5 ft 7 in (1.7 m)	Jr	Piedmont High School	San Leandro, CA
F	13	Maria Konstantinidou	6 ft 2 in (1.88 m)	Sr	Otto-Hahn-Gymnasium; Fresno State	Thessaloniki, Greece
F	15	Mairead Hearty	6 ft 3 in (1.91 m)	Fr	Denver East High School	Denver, CO
F	20	Bailey Barnhard	6 ft 1 in (1.85 m)	Jr	Del Norte High School	San Diego, CA
G	21	Eva DeChent	5 ft 11 in (1.8 m)	Jr	Putnam Valley High School; Rhode Island	Westchester, NY
G	24	Naomi Panganiban	5 ft 7 in (1.7 m)	Jr	La Jolla Country Day School	San Diego, CA
F	54	Mayenabasi Akpan	6 ft 3 in (1.91 m)	Fr	South Medford High School	Ashland, OR
G	77	Nayli Padilla	5 ft 9 in (1.75 m)	Jr	ÍES Tarahales; New Mexico	Santa Cruz de Tenerife, Spain

Head coach

- Stacie Terry-Hutson (UT Arlington)

Assistant coach(es)

- Kellie Lewis (Boise State)
- Gregg Gottlieb (UCLA)
- Mel Boscarino (Dominican (CA))
- Justin Hutson (Cal State Bakersfield)
- John Smith (Dominican (CA))

Legend

- (C) Team captain
- (S) Suspended
- (I) Ineligible
- (W) Walk-on
- Injured
- Current redshirt

Roster

== Schedule and results ==
Date time, TV	Rank^{#}	Opponent^{#}	Result	Record	High points	High rebounds	High assists	Site (attendance) city, state
Non-conference regular season
November 2, 2026*; 6:00 p.m., YouTube		Cal State Fullerton	W 77–51	1–0	13 – Akpan	9 – Barnhard	5 – Navarro	Viejas Arena; San Diego, CA
November 5, 2026*; 11:00 a.m., YouTube		North Texas	W 73–57	2–0	25 – Martinez	9 – Tied	2 – Tied	Viejas Arena (5,090); San Diego, CA
November 8, 2026*; 1:00 p.m., YouTube		UTSA	W 65–56	3–0	15 – Madjo	4 – Tied	3 – Tied	Viejas Arena (1,194); San Diego, CA
November 11, 2026*; 7:00 p.m., YouTube		Colorado	L 55–64	3–1	13 – DeChent	5 – Tied	3 – Tied	Viejas Arena (2,427); San Diego, CA
November 19, 2026*; 6:00 p.m., ESPN+		at Cal State Northridge						Premier America Credit Union Arena; Northridge, CA
November 22, 2026*; 1:00 p.m., YouTube		Winthrop						Viejas Arena; San Diego, CA
November 27, 2026*; 2:00 p.m., MW+		at Hawaii; Rainbow Wahine Showdown						Stan Sheriff Center; Honolulu, HI
November 28, 2026*; 4:30 p.m.		vs. Stanford; Rainbow Wahine Showdown						Stan Sheriff Center; Honolulu, HI
November 29, 2026*; 3:30 p.m.		vs. Columbia; Rainbow Wahine Showdown						Stan Sheriff Center; Honolulu, HI
December 3, 2026*; 7:00 p.m., ESPN+		at Santa Clara						Leavey Center; Santa Clara, CA
December 9, 2026*; 2:00 p.m., ESPN+		at Saint Mary's						University Credit Union Pavilion; Moraga, CA
December 11, 2026*; 6:00 p.m., ESPN+		at Pacific						Alex G. Spanos Center; Stockton, CA
December 20, 2026*; 12:30 p.m., BallerTV		vs. IU Indy; West Palm Beach Classic						Rubin Arena; West Palm Beach, FL
December 21, 2026*; 12:30 p.m., BallerTV		vs. Saint Louis; West Palm Beach Classic						Rubin Arena; West Palm Beach, FL
December 29, 2026*; 6:00 p.m., YouTube		Point Loma						Viejas Arena; San Diego, CA
Pac-12 regular season
January 6, 2027; 6:00 p.m., YouTube		Utah State						Viejas Arena; San Diego, CA
January 10, 2027; 1:00 p.m., The CW		Boise State						Viejas Arena; San Diego, CA
January 13, 2027; 7:00 p.m., USA		at Oregon State						Gill Coliseum; Corvallis, OR
January 16, 2027; 6:00 p.m., The CW		at Colorado State						Moby Arena; Fort Collins, CO
January 21, 2027; 6:00 p.m., YouTube		Gonzaga						Viejas Arena; San Diego, CA
January 24, 2027; 9:00 a.m., The CW		at Texas State						Strahan Arena; San Marcos, TX
January 31, 2027; 12:00 p.m., The CW		Colorado State						Viejas Arena; San Diego, CA
February 3, 2027; 6:00 p.m., YouTube		at Washington State						Beasley Coliseum; Pullman, WA
February 6, 2027; 8:00 p.m., The CW		at Gonzaga						McCarthey Athletic Center; Spokane, WA
February 10, 2027; 6:00 p.m., YouTube		Fresno State						Viejas Arena; San Diego, CA
February 14, 2027; 1:00 p.m., YouTube		at Boise State						ExtraMile Arena; Boise, ID
February 17, 2027; 6:00 p.m., YouTube		Oregon State						Viejas Arena; San Diego, CA
February 21, 2027; 1:00 p.m., YouTube		Washington State						Viejas Arena; San Diego, CA
February 24, 2027; 6:00 p.m., YouTube		at Utah State						Smith Spectrum; Logan, UT
February 27, 2027; 2:00 p.m., YouTube		at Fresno State						Save Mart Center; Fresno, CA
March 6, 2027; 1:00 p.m., YouTube		Texas State						Viejas Arena; San Diego, CA
Pac-12 tournament
March 9–13, 2027; TBA		vs.						MGM Grand Garden Arena; Paradise, NV
*Non-conference game. ^{#}Rankings from AP Poll. (#) Tournament seedings in parentheses. All times are in Pacific.

== See also ==
- 2026–27 San Diego State Aztecs men's basketball team
