= 2026–27 Fresno State Bulldogs women's basketball team =

American college basketball season

2026–27 Fresno State Bulldogs women's basketball
- Conference: Pac-12 Conference
- Record: 3–1 (0–0 Pac-12)
- Head coach: Ryan McCarthy (2nd season)
- Associate head coach: Shaina Afoa
- Assistant coaches: Ramaundo Vaughn; Jenna McCarthy; Jalon McCullough; Becca Bornhorst
- Home arena: Save Mart Center

2026–27 Pac-12 Conference women's basketball standings
	Conf.				Overall
Team	W		L	PCT	W		L	PCT
Texas State	0	–	0	–	4	–	0	1.000
Boise State	0	–	0	–	4	–	1	.800
Fresno State	0	–	0	–	3	–	1	.750
Oregon State	0	–	0	–	3	–	2	.600
San Diego State	0	–	0	–	3	–	2	.600
Gonzaga	0	–	0	–	3	–	3	.500
Colorado State	0	–	0	–	2	–	2	.500
Washington State	0	–	0	–	2	–	3	.400
Utah State	0	–	0	–	2	–	4	.333
† 2027 Pac-12 Tournament winner As of November 20, 2026; Rankings from AP poll

The 2026–27 Fresno State Bulldogs women's basketball team represents California State University, Fresno during the 2026–27 NCAA Division I women's basketball season. The Bulldogs, led by second-year head coach Ryan McCarthy, play their home games at the Save Mart Center in Fresno, California, as newly members of the Pac-12 Conference.

== Previous season ==
The Bulldogs finished the 2025–26 season 15–18, 8–12 in Mountain West play, to finish in seventh place. As a No. 7 seed in the Mountain West tournament, they defeated Nevada in the first round before losing to UNLV in the quarterfinals.

This season will mark Fresno State's last season as members of the Mountain West Conference, as they will be joining the newly reformed Pac-12 Conference, effective July 1, 2026.

== Offseason ==
=== Departures ===
Fresno State departures
Name	Num	Pos.	Height	Year	Hometown	Reason for departure
Aloni Oliver	1	G	5'9"	(redshirt) Freshman	Clovis, CA	Transferred to Cal State Bakersfield
Danae Powell	3	G	5'7"	Sophomore	Las Vegas, NV	Transferred to Loyola Marymount
Jasia Gamble	4	F	6'0"	Senior	San Bruno, CA	Graduated; signed to play professionally with Bay City Blaze
Morelia Chavez	8	F	6'1"	Graduate Student	Morelia, Mexico	Graduated
Emilia Long	11	G	5'9"	Graduate Student	Port Angeles, WA	Graduated
Avery Watkins	12	F	6'1"	(redshirt) Junior	Seattle, WA	Transferred to Pittsburgh
Indiya Clarke	20	G	5'11"	Senior	Wasilla, AK	Graduated
Hedda Köehne	25	F/C	6'2"	Senior	Lette, Germany	Graduated
Djessira Diawara	32	F	6'3"	Graduate Student	Bamako, Mali	Graduated
Alexiz Graise		G	6'0"	Freshman	Phoenix, AZ	Transferred to Morgan State

=== Incoming transfers ===
Fresno State incoming transfers
Name	Num	Pos.	Height	Year	Hometown	Previous school
Mekhia Chase	1	G	5'7"	Senior	California, MD	North Texas
Jada Hunter	3	G	5'10"	Senior	Vallejo, CA	Saint Mary's
Latisha Wilson	4	F	6'4"	Junior	Adelaide, Australia	Midland College
Lola Donez	5	G	5'11"	Junior	Lahaina, HI	California
Rubi Gray	10	G	5'10"	Junior	Devonport, Australia	Sacramento State
Ivy Brown	12	F	6'1"	Senior	Leithfield, New Zealand	UT Rio Grande Valley
Zawadi Ogot	54	G	5'11"	Junior	Upland, CA	Loyola Marymount

==== Recruiting ====
There was no recruiting class of 2026.

== Roster ==
2026–27 Fresno State Bulldogs women's basketball team
Players
Coaches

Pos.	#	Name	Height	Year	Previous school	Hometown
G	1	Mekhia Chase	5 ft 7 in (1.7 m)	Sr	North Texas	California, Maryland
G	3	Jada Hunter	5 ft 10 in (1.78 m)	Sr	Saint Mary's	Vallejo, California
F	4	Latisha Wilson	6 ft 4 in (1.93 m)	Jr	Midland College	Adelaide, Australia
G	5	Lola Donez	5 ft 11 in (1.8 m)	Jr	California	Lahaina, Hawaii
G	6	Sienna Clark	5 ft 9 in (1.75 m)	Fr	Rouse Hill High School	Sydney, Australia
G	10	Rubi Gray	5 ft 10 in (1.78 m)	So	Sacramento State	Devonport, Australia
F	12	Ivy Brown	6 ft 0 in (1.83 m)	Sr	UT Rio Grande	Leithfield, New Zealand
F	13	Ella Barmentloo	6 ft 3 in (1.91 m)	Fr	St Mary's Anglican Girls' School	Perth, Australia
F/C	14	Ashlyn Rean	6 ft 2 in (1.88 m)	RS So	Alaska Anchorage	Rangiora, New Zealand
G	21	Ava Marr	5 ft 9 in (1.75 m)	So	Archbishop Murphy High School	Brier, Washington
G	23	Mylaena Norton	5 ft 6 in (1.68 m)	Fr	Redmond High School	Redmond, Oregon
F	24	Kenzie Sirowich	5 ft 10 in (1.78 m)	RS Sr	Alaska Anchorage	Seymour, Connecticut
G	34	Briana Webb	5 ft 9 in (1.75 m)	RS Fr	Piedmont High School	Hayward, California
F	42	Ryleigh Schoonover	6 ft 0 in (1.83 m)	Fr	Clovis West High School	Porterville, California
G	54	Zawadi Ogot	5 ft 11 in (1.8 m)	Jr	Loyola Marymount	Upland, California

Head coach

- Ryan McCarthy (Northwest Nazarene)

Assistant coach(es)

- Shaina Afoa (Central Washington)
- Ramaundo Vaughn (Hawaii Pacific)
- Jenna McCarthy (Florida Gulf Coast)
- Jalon McCullough (Alaska Fairbanks)
- Becca Bornhorst (Butler)

Legend

- (C) Team captain
- (S) Suspended
- (I) Ineligible
- (W) Walk-on
- Injured
- Current redshirt

Roster
Last update: September 19, 2026

== Schedule and results ==
Date time, TV	Rank^{#}	Opponent^{#}	Result	Record	High points	High rebounds	High assists	Site (attendance) city, state
Exhibition
October 30, 2026*; 6:00 p.m.		Stanislaus State	W 107–29		17 – Hunter	9 – Brown	5 – Hunter	Save Mart Center; Fresno, CA
Non-conference regular season
November 4, 2026*; 6:30 p.m., YouTube		UC Merced	W 94–32	1–0	19 – Chase	15 – Rean	6 – Hunter	Save Mart Center (1,130); Fresno, CA
November 7, 2026*; 12:00 p.m., ESPN+		at Colorado	L 56–73	1–1	20 – Chase	6 – Donez	2 – Chase	CU Events Center (1,974); Boulder, CO
November 11, 2026*; 6:30 p.m., YouTube		New Mexico	W 74–56	2-1	11 – Donez	8 – Chase	4 – Ogot	Save Mart Center (1,109); Fresno, CA
November 14, 2026*; 12:00 p.m., YouTube		Northern Arizona	W 85–71	3–1	18 – Rean	12 – Brown	2 – Tied	Save Mart Center (1,041); Fresno, CA
November 24, 2026*; 11:00 a.m., ESPN+		at Florida Gulf Coast						Alico Arena; Fort Myers, FL
November 27, 2026*; 3:00 p.m., Spiideo		vs. Louisiana–Monroe; Big Easy Classic Bayou Tournament						Alario Center; Westwego, LA
November 28, 2026*; 12:30 p.m., Spiideo		vs. UT Arlington; Big Easy Classic Bayou Tournament						Alario Center; Westwego, LA
December 2, 2026*; 2:00 p.m., ESPN+		at San Diego						Jenny Craig Pavilion; San Diego, CA
December 5, 2026*; 2:30 p.m., YouTube		Saint Mary's						Save Mart Center; Fresno, CA
December 11, 2026*; 6:30 p.m., YouTube		Southern Miss						Save Mart Center; Fresno, CA
December 13, 2026*; 2:00 p.m., YouTube		Grambling State						Save Mart Center; Fresno, CA
December 20, 2026*; 2:00 p.m., YouTube		Texas A&M–Corpus Christi						Save Mart Center; Fresno, CA
December 22, 2026*; 1:00 p.m., YouTube		Hawaii						Save Mart Center; Fresno, CA
December 28, 2026*; 10:00 a.m., ESPN+		at Bowling Green						Stroh Center; Bowling Green, OH
December 30, 2026*; 3:30 p.m., ESPN+		at Ball State						Worthen Arena; Muncie, IN
Pac-12 regular season
January 7, 2027; 5:30 p.m., YouTube		at Colorado State						Moby Arena; Fort Collins, CO
January 9, 2027; 5:00 p.m., YouTube		Gonzaga						Save Mart Center; Fresno, CA
January 16, 2027; 2:00 p.m., YouTube		Utah State						Save Mart Center; Fresno, CA
January 20, 2027; 5:00 p.m., YouTube		at Texas State						Strahan Arena; San Marcos, TX
January 23, 2027; 8:00 p.m., The CW		Oregon State						Save Mart Center; Fresno, CA
January 28, 2027; 6:00 p.m., YouTube		at Washington State						Beasley Coliseum; Pullman, WA
January 31, 2027; 2:00 p.m., SWX		at Gonzaga						McCarthey Athletic Center; Spokane, WA
February 3, 2027; 6:30 p.m., YouTube		Boise State						Save Mart Center; Fresno, CA
February 7, 2027; 2:00 p.m., YouTube		Colorado State						Save Mart Center; Fresno, CA
February 10, 2027; 6:00 p.m., YouTube		at San Diego State						Viejas Arena; San Diego, CA
February 13, 2027; 11:00 a.m., YouTube		Utah State						Save Mart Center; Fresno, CA
February 17, 2027; 6:30 p.m., YouTube		Texas State						Save Mart Center; Fresno, CA
February 24, 2027; 6:30 p.m., YouTube		Washington State						Save Mart Center; Fresno, CA
February 27, 2027; 2:00 p.m., YouTube		San Diego State						Save Mart Center; Fresno, CA
March 3, 2027; 6:00 p.m., YouTube		at Oregon State						Gill Coliseum; Corvallis, OR
March 6, 2027; 1:00 p.m., YouTube		at Boise State						ExtraMile Arena; Boise, ID
Pac-12 tournament
March 9–13, 2027; TBA		vs.						MGM Grand Garden Arena; Paradise, NV
*Non-conference game. ^{#}Rankings from AP Poll. (#) Tournament seedings in parentheses. All times are in Pacific.
