= 2026–27 California Golden Bears women's basketball team =

Intercollegiate basketball season

2026–27 California Golden Bears women's basketball
- Conference: Atlantic Coast Conference
- Record: 4–0 (0–0 ACC)
- Head coach: Charmin Smith (8th season)
- Associate head coach: Heidi Heintz (5th season)
- Assistant coaches: Travon Bryant (4th season); Jenny Huth (3rd season); Eliza Pierre (6th season)
- Home arena: Haas Pavilion

2026–27 ACC women's basketball standings
	Conf.				Overall
Team	W		L	PCT	W		L	PCT
No. 7 Louisville	0	–	0	–	5	–	0	1.000
California	0	–	0	–	4	–	0	1.000
Florida State	0	–	0	–	4	–	0	1.000
Miami (FL)	0	–	0	–	4	–	0	1.000
SMU	0	–	0	–	4	–	0	1.000
Virginia	0	–	0	–	4	–	0	1.000
Virginia Tech	0	–	0	–	4	–	0	1.000
Wake Forest	0	–	0	–	4	–	0	1.000
No. 5 Duke	0	–	0	–	3	–	0	1.000
No. 13 Notre Dame	0	–	0	–	3	–	0	1.000
Pittsburgh	0	–	0	–	3	–	0	1.000
Syracuse	0	–	0	–	3	–	0	1.000
Clemson	0	–	0	–	3	–	1	.750
Georgia Tech	0	–	0	–	3	–	1	.750
NC State	0	–	0	–	3	–	1	.750
Stanford	0	–	0	–	2	–	1	.667
Boston College	0	–	0	–	1	–	2	.333
No. 23 North Carolina	0	–	0	–	1	–	2	.333
† 2027 ACC tournament winner As of November 14, 2026; Rankings from AP Poll

The 2026–27 California Golden Bears women's basketball team currently represents the University of California, Berkeley during the 2026–27 NCAA Division I women's basketball season. The Golden Bears, led by eighth-year head coach Charmin Smith, play their home games at Haas Pavilion in Berkeley, California and compete as a member of the Atlantic Coast Conference.

== Previous season ==
The Golden Bears finished the 2025–26 season 21–15 overall and 9–9 in ACC play, to finish in tenth place in the conference. As the No. 10 seed in the ACC tournament, they defeated No. 15 Wake Forest 75–52 in the first round before falling in the second round 59–70 to No. 7 Syracuse.

Following their tournament loss, the Golden Bears earned an at-large bid to the WBIT, their second appearance in program history and their first since the inaugural tournament in 2024. They were seeded No. 3 in the North Dakota State Bracket. In the first round, they defeated Santa Clara 72–68, before winning 83–75 No. 2 Kansas State 83–75 second round. They advanced to the quarterfinals, where they fell to eventual tournament winners No. 4 seeded Columbia 68–74 to end their season.

== Offseason ==
=== Departures ===
California departures
Name	Number	Pos.	Height	Year	Hometown	Reason for departure
Lola Donez	5	Guard	5'11"	Sophomore	Lahaina, HI	Transferred to Fresno State
Isis Johnson-Musah	6	Guard	5'10"	Freshman	Detroit, MI	Transferred to Charlotte
Grace McCallop	12	Guard	5'10"	Freshman	Kansas City, KS	Transferred to Arkansas
Claudia Langarita	22	Forward	6'4"	Graduate student	Barcelona, Spain	Graduated
Aliyahna Morris	25	Guard	5'5"	Freshman	Rancho Cucamonga, CA	Transferred to Arizona
Sakima Walker	35	Center	6'6"	Graduate student	Columbus, OH	Graduated; went undrafted in the 2026 WNBA draft, signed a training camp contract with the Minnesota Lynx

=== Incoming transfers ===
California incoming transfers
Name	Number	Pos.	Height	Year	Hometown	Previous school
Shannon Dowell	1	Guard	5'10"	Senior	O'Fallon, IL	Missouri
Carly Amborn	11	Guard	6'2"	Sophomore	Larkspur, CA	Stanford
Albina Syla	12	Center	6'5"	Junior	Vantaa, Finland	Rhode Island

=== Recruiting class ===
There was no 2026 recruiting class.

== Roster ==
2026–27 California Golden Bears women's basketball team
Players
Coaches

Pos.	#	Name	Height	Year	Previous school	Hometown
G	0	Shannon Dowell	5 ft 10 in (1.78 m)	Sr	O'Fallon Township; Missouri	O'Fallon, IL
G	1	Mjracle Sheppard	5 ft 10 in (1.78 m)	Sr	Montverde Academy; LSU	Kent, WA
F	2	Anna Lagonikaki	6 ft 3 in (1.91 m)	Fr		Crete, Greece
F	3	Taylor Barnes	6 ft 0 in (1.83 m)	So	South Grand Prairie	Grand Prairie, TX
F	7	Naya Ojukwu	6 ft 1 in (1.85 m)	Jr	Mountain View; Morgan State	Meridian, ID
F	8	Zara Russell	6 ft 2 in (1.88 m)	Fr		Canberra, Australia
G	10	Lulu Twidale	5 ft 10 in (1.78 m)	Sr	Siena Catholic College	Sunshine Coast, Australia
G	11	Carly Amborn	6 ft 2 in (1.88 m)	So	San Domenico School; Stanford	Larkspur, CA
C	12	Albina Syla	6 ft 5 in (1.96 m)	Jr	Mäkelänrinne lukio Rhode Island	Vantaa, Finland
F	14	Jovana Jevtovic	6 ft 4 in (1.93 m)	Fr		Ivanjica, Serbia
G	21	Gisella Maul	5 ft 11 in (1.8 m)	Sr	Cedar Park; Texas	Cedar Park, TX
G	22	Ruby Perkins	5 ft 8 in (1.73 m)	Fr		East Killara, Australia
G	23	Anastasia Drosouni	5 ft 11 in (1.8 m)	Sr	Expaideftiria Fryganiotis	Thessaloniki, Greece
G	42	Sofia Bowes	5 ft 10 in (1.78 m)	Jr	San Ramon	San Ramon, CA

Head coach

- Charmin Smith (Stanford)

Assistant coach(es)

- Heidi Heintz (UC Davis)
- Travon Bryant (Missouri)
- Jenny Huth (Colorado)
- Eliza Pierre (California)

Legend

- (C) Team captain
- (S) Suspended
- (I) Ineligible
- (W) Walk-on
- Injured
- Current redshirt

Roster
Last update: August 9, 2026

== Schedule and results ==
Date time, TV	Rank^{#}	Opponent^{#}	Result	Record	High points	High rebounds	High assists	Site (attendance) city, state
Exhibition
October 14, 2026*; 6:00 p.m.		UCLA; Jason Kidd Tipoff	L 53–87		13 – Twidale	6 – Barnes	6 – Maul	Haas Pavilion (3,434); Berkeley, CA
October 25, 2026*; 2:00 p.m., B1G+		at No. 3 USC	L 76–78		25 – Twidale	9 – Twidale	3 – Syla	Galen Center (4,748); Los Angeles, CA
October 29, 2026*; 6:00 p.m.		Vanguard	W 106–62		–	–	–	Haas Pavilion; Berkeley, CA
Regular season
November 2, 2026*; 7:00 p.m., ACCNX		Washington State	W 80–58	1–0	26 – Twidale	8 – Twidale	4 – Syla	Haas Pavilion (2,501); Berkeley, CA
November 5, 2026*; 6:00 p.m., ACCNX		Long Beach State	W 100–46	2–0	15 – Twidale	10 – Dowell	8 – Dowell	Haas Pavilion (1,628); Berkeley, CA
November 8, 2026*; 11:00 a.m.		vs. San Francisco	W 87–65	3–0	18 – Jevtovic	9 – Twidale	6 – Twidale	Tahoe Blue Event Center (1,250); Stateline, NV
November 12, 2026*; 11:00 a.m.		Charleston	W 78–64	4–0	20 – Dowell	8 – Syla	4 – Maul	Haas Pavilion (4,915); Berkeley, CA
November 14, 2026*; 12:00 p.m.		at UC Santa Barbara						The Thunderdome; Santa Barbara, CA
November 20, 2026*; 6:00 p.m., BallerTV		vs. Hawaii; North Shore Showcase						George Q. Cannon Activities Center; Laie, HI
November 23, 2026*; 3:00 p.m., BallerTV		vs. Gonzaga; North Shore Showcase						George Q. Cannon Activities Center; Laie, HI
November 27, 2026*; 12:00 p.m.		Delaware; Raising the B.A.R. Invitational semifinals						Haas Pavilion; Berkeley, CA
November 28, 2026*; TBA		Gardner–Webb/East Carolina; Raising the B.A.R. Invitational						Haas Pavilion; Berkeley, CA
December 3, 2026*; 6:00 p.m., ACCN		Texas A&M; ACC–SEC Challenge						Haas Pavilion; Berkeley, CA
December 7, 2026*; 7:30 p.m.		at Loyola Marymount						Gersten Pavilion; Los Angeles, CA
December 13, 2026; 1:00 p.m., ACCN		Stanford						Haas Pavilion; Berkeley, CA
December 20, 2026*; 3:00 p.m., BTN		vs. Nebraska; Bay Area Women's Classic						Chase Center; San Francisco, CA
December 22, 2026*; 12:00 p.m.		Southern Utah						Haas Pavilion; Berkeley, CA
December 31, 2026; 2:00 p.m., ACCNX		at Notre Dame						Joyce Center; South Bend, IN
January 3, 2027; 11:00 a.m., ACCN		at Louisville						KFC Yum! Center; Louisville, KY
January 7, 2027; 6:00 p.m., ACCNX		NC State						Haas Pavilion; Berkeley, CA
January 10, 2027; 2:00 p.m., ACCN		Miami (FL)						Haas Pavilion; Berkeley, CA
January 14, 2027; 4:00 p.m., ACCNX		at Duke						Cameron Indoor Stadium; Durham, NC
January 17, 2027; 11:00 a.m., ACCNX		at Wake Forest						LJVM Coliseum; Winston-Salem, NC
January 21, 2027; 5:00 p.m., ACCN		North Carolina						Haas Pavilion; Berkeley, CA
January 24, 2027; 3:00 p.m., ACCN		Syracuse						Haas Pavilion; Berkeley, CA
January 28, 2027; 3:00 p.m., ACCNX		at Virginia						John Paul Jones Arena; Charlottesville, VA
January 31, 2027; 11:00 a.m., ACCN		at Virginia Tech						Cassell Coliseum; Blacksburg, VA
February 4, 2027; 6:00 p.m., ACCNX		Florida State						Haas Pavilion; Berkeley, CA
February 7, 2027; 3:00 p.m., ACCN		Georgia Tech						Haas Pavilion; Berkeley, CA
February 11, 2027; 7:00 p.m., ACCNX		at Stanford						Maples Pavilion; Stanford, CA
February 18, 2027; 5:00 p.m., ACCN		at Clemson						Littlejohn Coliseum; Clemson, SC
February 21, 2027; 12:00 p.m., ACCNX		at SMU						Moody Coliseum; University Park, TX
February 25, 2027; 6:00 p.m., ACCNX		Boston College						Haas Pavilion; Berkeley, CA
February 28, 2027; 11:00 a.m., ACCN		Pittsburgh						Haas Pavilion; Berkeley, CA
*Non-conference game. ^{#}Rankings from AP Poll. (#) Tournament seedings in parentheses. All times are in Pacific.
