= 2026–27 Washington State Cougars women's basketball team =

2026–27 Washington State Cougars women's basketball
- Conference: Pac-12 Conference
- Record: 2–3 (0–0 Pac-12)
- Head coach: Kamie Ethridge (9th season)
- Associate head coach: Laurie Koehn
- Assistant coaches: Camille Williams; Ula Motuga
- Home arena: Beasley Coliseum

2026–27 Pac-12 Conference women's basketball standings
	Conf.				Overall
Team	W		L	PCT	W		L	PCT
Texas State	0	–	0	–	4	–	0	1.000
Boise State	0	–	0	–	4	–	1	.800
Fresno State	0	–	0	–	3	–	1	.750
Oregon State	0	–	0	–	3	–	2	.600
San Diego State	0	–	0	–	3	–	2	.600
Gonzaga	0	–	0	–	3	–	3	.500
Colorado State	0	–	0	–	2	–	2	.500
Washington State	0	–	0	–	2	–	3	.400
Utah State	0	–	0	–	2	–	4	.333
† 2027 Pac-12 Tournament winner As of November 20, 2026; Rankings from AP poll

The 2026–27 Washington State Cougars women's basketball team will represent Washington State University during the 2026–27 NCAA Division I women's basketball season. The Cougars are led by ninth-year head coach Kamie Ethridge and they play their home games at Beasley Coliseum as members of the new Pac-12 Conference.

== Previous season ==
The Cougars finished with a regular season record of 9–25, 6–12 in WCC play to finish in a three way tied for eighth place. As a No. 9 seed in the WCC tournament they defeated Pacific and Pacific in the first and second rounds before losing to Portland in the third round.

This would be the first of two seasons as a WCC member before they join the newly revived Pac-12 in the 2026–27 season.

== Offseason ==
=== Departures ===
Washington State Departures
Name	Num	Pos.	Height	Year	Hometown	Reason for Departure
Jean Chiu	5	G	5'7"	Senior	Taipei, Taiwan	Graduated
Marta Alsina	12	G	5'11"	Sophomore	Barcelona, Spain	Transferred
Keandra Koorits	15	G/F	6'2"	(redshirt) Freshman	Tallinn, Estonia	Transferred to Pepperdine
Lauren Glazier	25	F	6'4"	Senior	North Bend, WA	Graduated

=== Incoming transfers ===
Washington State Incoming Transfers
Name	Num	Pos.	Height	Year	Hometown	Previous School
Elizaveta Filchagina	22	F	6'2"	Sophomore	Moscow, Russia	SMU

==== Recruiting ====
There was no recruiting class of 2026.

== Roster ==
2026–27 Washington State Cougars women's basketball team
Players
Coaches

Pos.	#	Name	Height	Year	Previous school	Hometown
G	0	Aicha Bah	5 ft 6 in (1.68 m)	Fr	Kangoeroes Basket Mechelen	Willebroek, Belgium
G	1	Malvina Haziri	5 ft 9 in (1.75 m)	So	KBF Prishtina	Vushtrria, Kosovo
G	2	Eleonora Villa	5 ft 8 in (1.73 m)	Sr	Costa Masnaga	Lissone, Italy
G	3	Gianella Espadale	5 ft 5 in (1.65 m)	Fr		Cutral Có, Argentina
F	6	Tahara Magassa	6 ft 4 in (1.93 m)	RS Fr	Saint-Amand Hainut	Paris, France
G	8	Mackenzie Chatfield	5 ft 9 in (1.75 m)	Sr	Westlake Girls HS; Western Kentucky	Auckland, New Zealand
G	9	Tanja Valancic	6 ft 0 in (1.83 m)	So	Akson Ilirija	Ljubljana, Slovenia
G	10	Charlotte Abraham	6 ft 0 in (1.83 m)	Jr	Lycée Marguerite de Flandre	Cambrai, France
G	11	Reese Jordan	5 ft 9 in (1.75 m)	Fr	West Linn HS	West Linn, OR
F	22	Lizzy Filchagina	6 ft 2 in (1.88 m)	Fr	Spartak Saint Petersburg; SMU	Moscow, Russia
G	33	Alex Covill	6 ft 6 in (1.98 m)	Sr	Hellgate HS	Missoula, MT
C	55	Malia Ruud	6 ft 2 in (1.88 m)	So	Chiawana HS	Pasco, WA

Head coach

- Kamie Ethridge (Texas)

Assistant coach(es)

- Laurie Koehn (Kansas State)
- Camille Williams (Wisconsin)
- Ula Motuga (Washington State)

Legend

- (C) Team captain
- (S) Suspended
- (I) Ineligible
- (W) Walk-on
- Injured
- Current redshirt

Roster

== Schedule and results ==
Date time, TV	Rank^{#}	Opponent^{#}	Result	Record	High points	High rebounds	High assists	Site (attendance) city, state
Exhibition
October 25, 2026*; 11:00 a.m.		Westmont	W 71–46		–	–	–	Beasley Coliseum (NA); Pullman, WA
Non-conference regular Season
November 2, 2026*; 7:00 p.m., ACCNX		at California	L 58–80	0–1	20 – Villa	7 – Ruud	7 – Villa	Haas Pavilion (2,501); Berkeley, CA
November 6, 2026*; 7:00 p.m., B1G+		at Oregon	L 57–64	0–2	22 – Villa	7 – Ruud	4 – Valancic	Matthew Knight Arena (4,531); Eugene, OR
November 9, 2026*; 11:00 a.m., YouTube		Idaho; Battle of the Palouse	W 76–53	1–2	18 – Chatfield	10 – Valancic	7 – Valancic	Beasley Coliseum (2,082); Pullman, WA
November 13, 2026*; 6:00 p.m., YouTube		Southern Utah	W 72–69	2–2	23 – Villa	10 – Chatfield	3 – Tied	Beasley Coliseum (906); Pullman, WA
November 17, 2026*; 7:30 p.m., YouTube		No. 16 Washington	L 54–82	2–3	17 – Villa	9 – Valancic	3 – Chatfield	Beasley Coliseum (1,369); Pullman, WA
November 26, 2026*; 1:00 p.m., FloHoops		vs. Kansas; Cancún Challenge Riviera Tournament						Hard Rock Hotel Riviera Maya; Cancún, Mexico
November 27, 2026*; 1:00 p.m., FloHoops		vs. Missouri State; Cancún Challenge Riviera Tournament						Hard Rock Hotel Riviera Maya; Cancún, Mexico
December 1, 2026*; 6:00 p.m., MW+		at Nevada						Lawlor Events Center; Reno, NV
December 5, 2026*; 2:00 p.m., YouTube		Portland						Beasley Coliseum; Pullman, WA
December 8, 2026*; 6:00 p.m., YouTube		Eastern Washington						Beasley Coliseum; Pullman, WA
December 12, 2026*; 3:30 p.m.		vs. Arizona State						Jenny Craig Pavilion; San Diego, CA
December 13, 2026*; 1:00 p.m., ESPN+		at San Diego						Jenny Craig Pavilion; San Diego, CA
December 16, 2026*; 6:00 p.m., YouTube		UNLV						Beasley Coliseum; Pullman, WA
December 20, 2026*; 11:00 a.m., ESPN+		vs. Liberty; Hawk Classic semifinals						Hagan Arena; Philadelphia, PA
December 21, 2026*; 8:00 a.m./10:00 a.m., ESPN+		vs. Holy Cross/Saint Joseph's; Hawk Classic 3rd place/championship						Hagan Arena; Philadelphia, PA
December 30, 2026*; 6:00 p.m., YouTube		Cal State Los Angeles						Beasley Coliseum; Pullman, WA
Pac-12 regular season
January 9, 2027; 12:00 p.m., YouTube		Texas State						Beasley Coliseum; Pullman, WA
January 14, 2027; 5:30 p.m., YouTube		at Boise State						ExtraMile Arena; Boise, ID
January 17, 2027; 1:00 p.m., The CW		at Oregon State						Gill Coliseum; Corvallis, OR
January 20, 2027; 6:00 p.m., YouTube		Colorado State						Beasley Coliseum; Pullman, WA
January 23, 2027; 11:00 a.m., YouTube		at Utah State						Smith Spectrum; Logan, UT
January 28, 2027; 6:00 p.m., YouTube		Fresno State						Beasley Coliseum; Pullman, WA
January 31, 2027; 12:00 p.m., YouTube		at Texas State						Strahan Arena; San Marcos, TX
February 3, 2027; 6:00 p.m., YouTube		San Diego State						Beasley Coliseum; Pullman, WA
February 7, 2027; 1:00 p.m., The CW		Oregon State						Beasley Coliseum; Pullman, WA
February 14, 2027; 10:30 a.m., The CW		at Colorado State						Moby Arena; Fort Collins, CO
February 17, 2027; 7:00 p.m., USA		Gonzaga						Beasley Coliseum; Pullman, WA
February 21, 2027; 1:00 p.m., YouTube		at San Diego State						Viejas Arena; San Diego, CA
February 24, 2027; 6:30 p.m., YouTube		at Fresno State						Save Mart Center; Fresno, CA
February 28, 2027; 11:00 a.m., The CW		Boise State						Beasley Coliseum; Pullman, WA
March 3, 2027; 6:00 p.m., YouTube		Utah State						Beasley Coliseum; Pullman, WA
March 6, 2027; 7:00 p.m., The CW		at Gonzaga						McCarthey Athletic Center; Spokane, WA
Pac-12 Women's Tournament
March 9–13, 2027; TBA		vs.						MGM Grand Garden Arena; Paradise, NV
*Non-conference game. ^{#}Rankings from AP Poll. (#) Tournament seedings in parentheses. All times are in Pacific Time.

== Game summaries ==
=== Exhibition: Westmont (D-II) ===
Starting lineups:

- Westmont: #2 Mariah Brown, #7 Immaculate Adongpiny, #10 Molly Garnand, #22 Jazmyn Shipp, #25 Skyler Knight
- Washington State: #2 Eleonora Villa, #8 Mackenzie Chatfield, #9 Tanja Valancic, #10 Charlotte Abraham, #33 Alex Covill

Oct. 25
11:00 a.m. PDT

Recap

Westmont Warriors 46, Washington State Cougars 71

Beasley Coliseum
Pullman, WA

=== at California ===
Broadcasters: Dave Benz and Ashlee Jones

Series history: California leads 51-29
Starting lineups:

- Washington State: #2 Eleonora Villa, #8 Mackenzie Chatfield, #9 Tanja Valancic, #10 Charlotte Abraham, #33 Alex Covill
- California: #3 Taylor Barnes, #10 Lulu Twidale, #12 Albina Syla, #21 Gisella Maul, #22 Ruby Perkins

ACCNX

Nov. 2
7:00 p.m. PST

Recap

Washington State Cougars 58, California Golden Bears 80
Scoring by quarter: 11-16, 13-21, 21-23, 13-20
Pts: Eleonora Villa 20; Rebs: Malia Ruud 7 Asts: Eleonora Villa 7	Pts: Lulu Twidale 26; Rebs: Lulu Twidale 8 Asts: Albina Syla 4

Haas Pavilion
Berkeley, CA
Attendance: 2,501
Referees: Maj Forsberg, Saif Esho, Cynthia Do

=== at Oregon ===
Broadcasters: Matthew Willinger, Ronan Belding and Brynn Castello

Series history: Oregon leads 74-22
Starting lineups:

- Washington State: #2 Eleonora Villa, #8 Mackenzie Chatfield, #9 Tanja Valancic, #10 Charlotte Abraham, #33 Alex Covill
- Oregon: #2 Katie Fiso, #4 Mallory Heyer, #14 Ari Long, #35 Ehis Etute, #42 Avary Cain

B1G+

Nov. 6
7:00 p.m. PST

Recap

Washington State Cougars 57, Oregon Ducks 64
Scoring by quarter: 8-13, 28-9, 11-24, 10-18
Pts: Eleonora Villa 22; Rebs: Malia Ruud 7 Asts: Tanja Valancic 4	Pts: Katie Fiso 19; Rebs: Mallory Heyer 12; Asts: Katie Fiso, Brooklynn Haywood 3

Matthew Knight Arena
Eugene, OR
Attendance: 4,531
Referees: Brenda Pantoja, Natasha Camy, Esther Hsu

=== Idaho ===
Broadcasters: Trevor Williams and Gwen Begley

Series history: Washington State leads 29-14
Starting lineups:

- Idaho: #4 Hope Hassmann, #5 Ella Uriarte, #8 Keanna Salave'a, #14 Katlin Kangur, #37 Ana Pinheiro
- Washington State: #2 Eleonora Villa, #8 Mackenzie Chatfield, #9 Tanja Valancic, #10 Charlotte Abraham, #33 Alex Covill

Nov. 9
11:00 a.m. PST

Idaho Vandals 53, Washington State Cougars 76
Scoring by quarter: 10-26, 5-18, 16-14, 22-18
Pts: Hope Hassmann 15; Rebs: Keanna Salave'a 12; Asts: Ella Uriarte 3	Pts: Mackenzie Chatfield 18; Rebs: Tanja Valancic 10; Asts: Tanja Valancic 7

Beasley Coliseum
Pullman, WA
Attendance: 2,032
Referees: Lorena Ahumada, Deon Lewis, Jonathan Varela

=== Southern Utah ===
Broadcasters: Trevor Williams and Gwen Begley

Series history: Washington State leads 3-1
Starting lineups:

- Southern Utah: #1 Kortney Doman, #4 Brooklyn Fely, #24 Melicia Nelson, #34 Denver Anderson, #44 Ava Uhrich
- Washington State: #2 Eleonora Villa, #8 Mackenzie Chatfield, #9 Tanja Valancic, #10 Charlotte Abraham, #33 Alex Covill

Pac-12 YouTube

Nov. 13
6:00 p.m. PST

Recap

Southern Utah Thunderbirds 69, Washington State Cougars 72
Scoring by quarter: 13-16, 13-8, 20-19, 23-29
Pts: Ava Uhrich 19; Rebs: Ava Uhrich 11; Asts: Ava Uhrich 4	Pts: Eleonora Villa 23; Rebs: Mackenzie Chatfield 10; Asts: Eleonora Villa, Mackenzie Chatfield 3

Beasley Coliseum
Pullman, WA
Attendance: 906
Referees: Teresa Turner, Johnny Mendez Jr., Allen Curry

=== Washington ===
Broadcasters:

Series history: Washington leads 76-30
Starting lineups:

- Washington:
- Washington State:

Nov. 17
7:30 p.m. PST

Washington Huskies vs. Washington State Cougars

Beasley Coliseum
Pullman, WA

=== vs. Kansas ===
Broadcasters:

Series history: Tied 1-1
Starting lineups:

- Kansas:
- Washington State:

Nov. 26
1:00 p.m. PST

Kansas Jayhawks vs. Washington State Cougars

Hard Rock Hotel Riviera Maya
Cancún, Mexico

=== vs. Missouri State ===
Broadcasters:

Series history: First meeting
Starting lineups:

- Missouri State:
- Washington State:

Nov. 27
1:00 p.m. PST

Missouri State Lady Bears vs. Washington State Cougars

Hard Rock Hotel Riviera Maya
Cancún, Mexico

=== at Nevada ===
Broadcasters:

Series history: Washington State leads 2-0
Starting lineups:

- Washington State:
- Nevada:

Dec. 1
6:00 p.m. PST

Washington State Cougars vs. Nevada Wolf Pack

Lawlor Events Center
Reno, NV

=== Portland ===
Broadcasters:

Series history: Portland leads 12-2
Starting lineups:

- Portland:
- Washington State:

Dec. 5
2:00 p.m. PST

Portland Pilots vs. Washington State Cougars

Beasley Coliseum
Pullman, WA

=== Eastern Washington ===
Broadcasters:

Series history: Washington State leads 28-12
Starting lineups:

- Eastern Washington:
- Washington State:

Dec. 8
6:00 p.m. PST

Eastern Washington Eagles vs. Washington State Cougars

Beasley Coliseum
Pullman, WA

=== Arizona State ===
Broadcasters:

Series history: Arizona State leads 49-22
Starting lineups:

- Arizona State:
- Washington State:

Dec. 12
3:30 p.m. PST

Arizona State Sun Devils vs. Washington State Cougars

Jenny Craig Pavilion
San Diego, CA

=== at San Diego ===
Broadcasters:

Series history: Washington State leads 7-0
Starting lineups:

- Washington State:
- San Diego:

Dec. 13
1:15 p.m. PST

Washington State Cougars vs. San Diego Toreros

Jenny Craig Pavilion
San Diego, CA

=== UNLV ===
Broadcasters:

Series history: UNLV leads 2-0
Starting lineups:

- UNLV:
- Washington State:

Dec. 16
6:00 p.m. PST

UNLV Lady Rebels vs. Washington State Cougars

Beasley Coliseum
Pullman, WA

=== vs. Liberty ===
Broadcasters:

Series history: First meeting
Starting lineups:

- Liberty:
- Washington State:

Dec. 20
11:00 a.m. PST

Liberty Lady Flames vs. Washington State Cougars

Hagan Arena
Philadelphia, PA

=== vs. Saint Joseph's/Holy Cross ===
Broadcasters:

Series history: First meeting
Starting lineups:

- Saint Joseph's/Holy Cross:
- Washington State:

Dec. 21
8:00/10:00 a.m. PST

Saint Joseph's Hawks/Holy Cross Crusaders vs. Washington State Cougars

Hagan Arena
Philadelphia, PA

=== Cal State LA (D-II) ===
Broadcasters:

Series history: First meeting
Starting lineups:

- Cal State LA:
- Washington State:

Dec. 30
6 p.m. PST

Cal State LA Golden Eagles vs. Washington State Cougars

Beasley Coliseum
Pullman, WA

=== Texas State ===
Broadcasters:

Series history: First meeting
Starting lineups:

- Texas State:
- Washington State:

Jan. 9
TBA

Texas State Bobcats vs. Washington State Cougars

Beasley Coliseum
Pullman, WA

=== at Boise State ===
Broadcasters:

Series history: Washington State leads 20-19
Starting lineups:

- Washington State:
- Boise State:

Jan. 14
5:30 p.m. PST

Washington State Cougars vs. Boise State Broncos

ExtraMile Arena
Boise, ID

=== at Oregon State ===
Broadcasters:

Series history: Oregon State leads 62-37
Starting lineups:

- Washington State:
- Oregon State:

Jan. 17
TBA

Washington State Cougars vs. Oregon State Beavers

Gill Coliseum
Corvallis, OR

=== Colorado State ===
Broadcasters:

Series history: Colorado State leads 4-0
Starting lineups:

- Colorado State:
- Washington State:

Jan. 20
TBA

Colorado State Rams vs. Washington State Cougars

Beasley Coliseum
Pullman, WA

=== at Utah State ===
Broadcasters:

Series history: Utah State leads 3-0
Starting lineups:

- Washington State:
- Utah State:

Jan. 23
TBA

Washington State Cougars vs. Utah State Aggies

Smith Spectrum
Logan, UT

=== Fresno State ===
Broadcasters:

Series history: Tied 2-2
Starting lineups:

- Fresno State:
- Washington State:

Jan. 28
TBA

Fresno State Bulldogs vs. Washington State Cougars

Beasley Coliseum
Pullman, WA

=== at Texas State ===
Broadcasters:

Series history: Starting lineups:

- Washington State:
- Texas State:

Jan. 31
TBA

Washington State Cougars vs. Texas State Bobcats

Strahan Arena
San Marcos, TX

=== San Diego State ===
Broadcasters:

Series history: San Diego State leads 3-2
Starting lineups:

- San Diego State:
- Washington State:

Feb. 3
TBA

San Diego State Aztecs vs. Washington State Cougars

Beasley Coliseum
Pullman, WA

=== Oregon State ===
Broadcasters:

Series history: Starting lineups:

- Oregon State:
- Washington State:

Feb. 7
TBA

Oregon State Beavers vs. Washington State Cougars

Beasley Coliseum
Pullman, WA

=== at Colorado State ===
Broadcasters:

Series history: Starting lineups:

- Washington State:
- Colorado State:

Feb. 14
TBD

Washington State Cougars vs. Colorado State Rams

Moby Arena
Fort Collins, CO

=== Gonzaga ===
Broadcasters:

Series history: Washington State leads 22-14
Starting lineups:

- Gonzaga:
- Washington State:

Feb. 17
TBA

Gonzaga Bulldogs vs. Washington State Cougars

Beasley Coliseum
Pullman, WA

=== at San Diego State ===
Broadcasters:

Series history: Starting lineups:

- Washington State:
- San Diego State:

Feb. 21
TBA

Washington State Cougars vs. San Diego State Aztecs

Viejas Arena
San Diego, CA

=== at Fresno State ===
Broadcasters:

Series history: Starting lineups:

- Washington State:
- Fresno State:

Feb. 24
TBA

Washington State Cougars vs. Fresno State Bulldogs

Save Mart Center
Fresno, CA

=== Boise State ===
Broadcasters:

Series history: Starting lineups:

- Boise State:
- Washington State:

Feb. 28

Boise State Broncos vs. Washington State Cougars

Beasley Coliseum
Pullman, WA

=== Utah State ===
Broadcasters:

Series history: Starting lineups:

- Utah State:
- Washington State:

Mar. 3

Utah State vs. Washington State Cougars

Beasley Coliseum
Pullman, WA

=== at Gonzaga ===
Broadcasters:

Series history: Starting lineups:

- Washington State:
- Gonzaga:

Mar. 6
TBA

Washington State Cougars vs. Gonzaga Bulldogs

McCarthey Athletic Center
Spokane, WA

== Rankings ==
Ranking movements Legend: — = Not ranked
	Week																				
Poll	Pre	1	2	3	4	5	6	7	8	9	10	11	12	13	14	15	16	17	18	19	Final
AP	—																				
Coaches	—																				

== See also ==
- 2026–27 Washington State Cougars men's basketball team
