= 2026–27 Utah State Aggies women's basketball team =

American collegiate basketball season

2026–27 Utah State Aggies women's basketball
- Conference: Pac-12 Conference
- Record: 2–4 (0–0 Pac-12)
- Head coach: Wesley Brooks (3rd season)
- Associate head coach: Anna Kjaerholt
- Assistant coaches: Quim Gomez; Jasmine Hotchkins-Parker; Kailie Quinn; Nic Kjaerholt
- Home arena: Smith Spectrum

2026–27 Pac-12 Conference women's basketball standings
| | Conf. | | | | Overall |
| Team | W | | L | PCT | W | | L | PCT |
|---|---|---|---|---|---|---|---|---|
| Texas State | 0 | – | 0 | – | 4 | – | 0 | 1.000 |
| Boise State | 0 | – | 0 | – | 4 | – | 1 | .800 |
| Fresno State | 0 | – | 0 | – | 3 | – | 1 | .750 |
| San Diego State | 0 | – | 0 | – | 3 | – | 1 | .750 |
| Oregon State | 0 | – | 0 | – | 3 | – | 2 | .600 |
| Gonzaga | 0 | – | 0 | – | 3 | – | 3 | .500 |
| Colorado State | 0 | – | 0 | – | 2 | – | 2 | .500 |
| Washington State | 0 | – | 0 | – | 2 | – | 3 | .400 |
| Utah State | 0 | – | 0 | – | 2 | – | 4 | .333 |
† 2027 Pac-12 Tournament winner As of November 19, 2026; Rankings from AP poll

The 2026–27 Utah State Aggies women's basketball team represents Utah State University during the 2026–27 NCAA Division I women's basketball season. The Aggies, led by third-year head coach Wesley Brooks, play their home games at the Smith Spectrum in Logan, Utah, as new members of the Pac-12 Conference.

== Previous season ==
The Aggies finished the 2025–26 season 6–24, 2–18 in Mountain West play, to finish in a tie for last place. As No. 11 seed in Mountain West tournament they lost in the first round to Grand Canyon.

This season will mark Utah State's last season as members of the Mountain West Conference, as they will be joining the newly reformed Pac-12 Conference, effective July 1, 2026.

== Offseason ==
=== Departures ===
Boise State departures
| Name | Num | Pos. | Height | Year | Hometown | Reason for departure |
|---|---|---|---|---|---|---|
| Rachel Wilson | 0 | F | 6'2" | Senior | Carrollton, GA | Graduated |
| Marina Asensio | 1 | G | 5'8" | Senior | Sabadell, Spain | Graduated |
| Andjela Marojevic | 13 | F | 5'10" | Sophomore | Vrbas, Serbia | Left the team |
| Karyn Sanford | 15 | G | 6'0" | Senior | Bergen, Norway | Graduated |
| Elise Livingston | 23 | G | 5'9" | Sophomore | Millville, UT | Transferred to Utah |
| Jamisyn Heaton | 32 | G/F | 5'10" | Senior | Lehi, UT | Graduated |
| Sophie Sene | 55 | F/C | 6'3" | Senior | Nice, France | Transferred to Colorado State |

=== Incoming transfers ===
Utah State incoming transfers
| Name | Num | Pos. | Height | Year | Hometown | Previous school |
|---|---|---|---|---|---|---|
| Catalina Roco | 1 | G | 5'6" | Junior | Quillota, Chile | Daytona State College |
| Lisa Thompson | 4 | G | 5'9" | Senior | Joliet, IL | Missouri |
| Addyson Horsley | 5 | G | 5'7" | Sophomore | Bluffdale, UT | Chandler–Gilbert CC |
| Acacia Hayes | 10 | G | 5'7" | Senior | Mufreesboro, TN | Arizona State |
| Sam Mancini | 15 | F/C | 6'4" | (redshirt) Sophomore | Webb City, MO | Providence |
| Kylani Rookstool | 20 | G | 5'9" | Senior | Snohmoish, WA | Western Oregon |
| Danika Galea | 25 | C | 6'3" | Junior | St. Paul's Bay, Malta | Arkansas |

==== Recruiting ====
There was no recruiting class of 2026.

== Roster ==
2026–27 Utah State Aggies women's basketball team
Players
Coaches

| Pos. | # | Name | Height | Year | Previous school | Hometown |
|---|---|---|---|---|---|---|
| G | 1 | Catalina Roco | 5 ft 6 in (1.68 m) | Jr | Daytona State College | Quillota, Chile |
| F | 2 | Saskia Kruger | 6 ft 1 in (1.85 m) | RS So | ASC Theresianum Mainz | Lusaka, Zambia |
| G | 3 | Aaliyah Gayles | 5 ft 9 in (1.75 m) | Sr | USC | Las Vegas, Nevada |
| G | 4 | Lisa Thompson | 5 ft 9 in (1.75 m) | Jr | Missouri | Joliet, Illinois |
| G | 5 | Addy Horsley | 5 ft 7 in (1.7 m) | So | Chandler–Gilbert CC | Bluffdale, Utah |
| F | 7 | Nicole Ogun | 6 ft 0 in (1.83 m) | Fr | Mattlidens Gymnasium | Kirkkonummi, Finland |
| G | 8 | Aitana Rosello Lopez | 5 ft 9 in (1.75 m) | So | Valencia Basket | Castellón de la Plana, Spain |
| G | 9 | Paloma Munoz Herreros | 6 ft 1 in (1.85 m) | So | Baloncesto Málaga | Málaga, Spain |
| G | 10 | Acacia Hayes | 5 ft 7 in (1.7 m) | Sr | Arizona State | Murfreesboro, Tennessee |
| G | 12 | Bella Cosme | 5 ft 5 in (1.65 m) | So | Rancho Christian School | Eastvale, California |
| F/C | 15 | Sam Mancini | 6 ft 4 in (1.93 m) | RS So | Providence | Webb City, Missouri |
| G | 20 | Kylani Rookstool | 5 ft 9 in (1.75 m) | Sr | Western Oregon | Snohomish, Washington |
| G | 21 | Mirembe Twehamye Montanana | 5 ft 10 in (1.78 m) | RS Fr | Valencia Basket | Valencia, Spain |
| C | 25 | Danika Galea | 6 ft 3 in (1.91 m) | Jr | Arkansas | St. Paul's Bay, Malta |
| F | 31 | Macie Brown | 6 ft 0 in (1.83 m) | Jr | College of Southern Idaho | Millville, Utah |

Head coach

- Wesley Brooks (West Virginia)

Assistant coach(es)

- Anna Kjaerholt (Kent State)
- Quim Gomez (AUB)
- Jasmine Hotchkins-Parker (Eastern New Mexico)
- Kailie Quinn (Weber State)
- Nic Kjaerholt (West Virginia Tech)

Legend

- (C) Team captain
- (S) Suspended
- (I) Ineligible
- (W) Walk-on
- Injured
- Current redshirt

Roster

== Schedule and results ==
| Date time, TV | Rank^{#} | Opponent^{#} | Result | Record | High points | High rebounds | High assists | Site (attendance) city, state |
Exhibition
| October 27, 2026*; 4:00 p.m. | | at Grand Canyon | L 48–78 | | 12 – Ogun | 9 – Ogun | 2 – Gayles | Global Credit Union Arena (441); Phoenix, AZ |
Non-conference regular season
| November 2, 2026*; 4:00 p.m., YouTube | | Westminster | W 61–45 | 1–0 | 19 – Ogun | 13 – Mancini | 3 – Tied | Smith Spectrum (706); Logan, UT |
| November 6, 2026*; 2:00 p.m., YouTube | | Loyola Marymount | L 45–70 | 1–1 | 9 – Rookstool | 9 – Mancini | 3 – Hayes | Smith Spectrum (409); Logan, UT |
| November 8, 2026*; 6:00 p.m., BTN | | at No. 3 USC | L 40–118 | 1–2 | 12 – Rookstool | 4 – Ogun | 3 – Twehamye Montanana | Galen Center (7,807); Los Angeles, CA |
| November 11, 2026*; 4:00 p.m., YouTube | | Idaho State | L 41–54 | 1–3 | 13 – Thompson | 7 – Ogun | 1 – Tied | Smith Spectrum (505); Logan, UT |
| November 13, 2026*; 11:00 a.m., YouTube | | Bethune–Cookman | W 83–60 | 2–3 | 20 – Thompson | 9 – Ogun | 3 – Ogun | Smith Spectrum (3,139); Logan, UT |
| November 18, 2026*; 2:00 p.m., ESPN+ | | at BYU | L 78–90 | 2–4 | 18 – Tied | 4 – Mancini | 4 – Rookstool | Marriott Center (1,718); Provo, UT |
| November 22, 2026*; 1:30 p.m., ESPN2 | | vs. No. 15 TCU; Wild Horse Sports Lone Star Series | | | | | | Dickies Arena; Fort Worth, TX |
| November 27, 2026*; 5:30 p.m. | | vs. Wyoming; ZotGiving Classic | | | | | | Bren Events Center; Irvine, CA |
| November 28, 2026*; 5:30 p.m. | | at UC Irvine; ZotGiving Classic | | | | | | Bren Events Center; Irvine, CA |
| December 1, 2026*; 7:00 p.m., ESPN+ | | at Utah | | | | | | Jon M. Huntsman Center; Salt Lake City, UT |
| December 5, 2026*; 12:00 p.m., YouTube | | San Jose State | | | | | | Smith Spectrum; Logan, UT |
| December 9, 2026*; 6:00 p.m. | | at Utah Valley | | | | | | UCCU Center; Orem, UT |
| December 12, 2026*; 12:00 p.m., YouTube | | Weber State | | | | | | Smith Spectrum; Logan, UT |
| December 16, 2026*; 7:00 p.m. | | at Idaho | | | | | | ICCU Arena; Moscow, ID |
| December 19, 2026*; 12:00 p.m., YouTube | | San Diego | | | | | | Smith Spectrum; Logan, UT |
Pac-12 regular season
| January 6, 2027; 7:00 p.m., YouTube | | at San Diego State | | | | | | Viejas Arena; San Diego, CA |
| January 9, 2027; 9:00 p.m., The CW | | Oregon State | | | | | | Smith Spectrum; Logan, UT |
| January 13, 2027; 7:00 p.m., YouTube | | Colorado State | | | | | | Smith Spectrum; Logan, UT |
| January 16, 2027; 3:00 p.m., YouTube | | at Fresno State | | | | | | Save Mart Center; Fresno, CA |
| January 20, 2027; 7:00 p.m., YouTube | | Boise State | | | | | | Smith Spectrum; Logan, UT |
| January 23, 2027; 12:00 p.m., YouTube | | Washington State | | | | | | Smith Spectrum; Logan, UT |
| January 28, 2027; 7:00 p.m., YouTube | | at Gonzaga | | | | | | McCarthey Athletic Center; Spokane, WA |
| January 30, 2027; 3:00 p.m., YouTube | | at Oregon State | | | | | | Gill Coliseum; Corvallis, OR |
| February 3, 2027; 7:00 p.m. | | Texas State | | | | | | Smith Spectrum; Logan, UT |
| February 11, 2027; 6:30 p.m. | | at Boise State | | | | | | ExtraMile Arena; Boise, ID |
| February 13, 2027; 12:00 p.m. | | Fresno State | | | | | | Smith Spectrum; Logan, UT |
| February 17, 2027; TBA | | at Colorado State | | | | | | Moby Arena; Fort Collins, CO |
| February 20, 2027; 1:00 p.m. | | at Texas State | | | | | | Strahan Arena; San Marcos, TX |
| February 24, 2027; 7:00 p.m. | | San Diego State | | | | | | Smith Spectrum; Logan, UT |
| February 27, 2027; 7:30 p.m. | | Gonzaga | | | | | | Smith Spectrum; Logan, UT |
| March 3, 2027; 7:00 p.m. | | at Washington State | | | | | | Beasley Coliseum; Pullman, WA |
Pac-12 tournament
| March 9–13, 2027; TBA | | vs. | | | | | | MGM Grand Garden Arena; Paradise, NV |
*Non-conference game. ^{#}Rankings from AP Poll. (#) Tournament seedings in parentheses. All times are in Mountain.
