= 2026–27 Texas State Bobcats women's basketball team =

American collegiate basketball season

2026–27 Texas State Bobcats women's basketball
- Conference: Pac-12 Conference
- Record: 3–0 (0–0 Pac-12)
- Head coach: Chris Kielsmeier (1st season)
- Assistant coaches: Latoja Schaben; Kevin Hackerott; Evie Goetz; Octavia Barnes
- Home arena: Strahan Arena

2026–27 Pac-12 Conference women's basketball standings
	Conf.				Overall
Team	W		L	PCT	W		L	PCT
Texas State	0	–	0	–	3	–	0	1.000
Boise State	0	–	0	–	3	–	1	.750
Fresno State	0	–	0	–	3	–	1	.750
San Diego State	0	–	0	–	3	–	1	.750
Oregon State	0	–	0	–	2	–	1	.667
Colorado State	0	–	0	–	2	–	2	.500
Gonzaga	0	–	0	–	2	–	2	.500
Washington State	0	–	0	–	2	–	2	.500
Utah State	0	–	0	–	2	–	3	.400
† 2027 Pac-12 Tournament winner As of November 15, 2026; Rankings from AP poll

The 2026–27 Texas State Bobcats women's basketball team represented Texas State University during the 2026–27 NCAA Division I women's basketball season. The Bobcats, led by first-year head coach Chris Kielsmeier, played their home games at Strahan Arena in San Marcos, Texas as new members of the Pac-12 Conference.

== Previous season ==
The Bobcats finished the 2025–26 season 11–19, 7–11 in Sun Belt play, to finish in a 3 way tie for eighth place. As an No. 8 seed in the Sun Belt tournament they lost in the third round to South Alabama.

This was the Bobcats' final season as members of the Sun Belt Conference, as they moved to the newly reformed Pac-12 Conference, starting in the 2026–27 season.

Antoine, Texas State's winningest head coach with 225 wins, announced on March 9, 2026 that she was stepping down after 15 seasons.On March 31, the Bobcats hired Cleveland State head coach Kielsmeier as her replacement.

== Offseason ==
=== Departures ===
Texas State departures
Name	Num	Pos.	Height	Year	Hometown	Reason for departure
Takeira Ramey	1	G	5'7"	Sophomore	Stafford, VA	Transferred to Loyola (MD)
KP Parr	2	G	5'4"	Sophomore	Waco, TX	Transferred to Northwestern State
Myla Harbor	4	G/F	5'11"	Junior	Ferriday, LA	Transferred
Myri Walker	5	G	5'4"	Senior	Burleson, TX	Graduated
Angel Carroll	10	F	6'1"	Freshman	Waco, TX	Transferred to Arkansas State
Mia Galbraith	11	G	5'9"	(redshirt) Sophomore	Sunshine Coast, Australia	Transferred to Northern Colorado
Kyla McBride	12	F	6'0"	Junior	Magnolia, AR	Transferred to Louisiana–Monroe
Taleiyah Gibbs	13	G	6'0"	Junior	Charleston, SC	TBD
Kyaija Stewart	20	F	6'0"	Junior	Ithaca, NY	Transferred to Presbyterian
Deja Jones	22	G	5'9"	Graduate Student	San Antonio, TX	Graduated

=== Incoming ===
Texas State incoming transfers
Name	Num	Pos.	Height	Year	Hometown	Previous school
Lay Fantroy	0	G	5'10"	Senior	Palestine, TX	Delaware
Emma Pique	1	G/F	5'11"	Junior	Barcelona, Spain	Northwest College
Aliyah Carter	2	G	5'7"	Junior	Austin, TX	Cal State Bakersfield
Lucija Milkovic	7	C	6'6"	Senior	Šibenik, Croatia	Seattle
Sofia Ceppellotti	10	F	6'1"	Junior	Ruda, Italy	North Alabama
Makenna Shaffer-Lauer	13	G	6'1"	Senior	Greeley, CO	Weber State
Cali Denson	22	G	5'8"	(redshirt) Junior	Milwaukie, OR	Oakland
Crystal Henderson	30	G	5'4"	Senior	Marietta, GA	Georgia State

=== Recruiting class ===
There was no 2026 recruiting class.

== Roster ==
2026–27 Texas State Bobcats women's basketball team
Players
Coaches

Pos.	#	Name	Height	Year	Previous school	Hometown
G	0	Lay Fantroy	5 ft 10 in (1.78 m)	Sr	Delaware	Palestine, Texas
G	1	Emma Pique	5 ft 11 in (1.8 m)	Jr	Northwest College	Barcelona, Spain
G	2	Aliyah Carter	5 ft 7 in (1.7 m)	Jr	Cal State Bakersfield	Austin, Texas
G	3	Saniya Burks	5 ft 8 in (1.73 m)	Jr	Rice High School	Mexia, Texas
C	5	Addison Carr	6 ft 6 in (1.98 m)	Fr	Hickman High School	Columbia, Missouri
C	7	Lucija Milkovic	6 ft 6 in (1.98 m)	Sr	Seattle	Šibenik, Croatia
F	10	Sofia Ceppellotti	6 ft 1 in (1.85 m)	Jr	North Alabama	Ruda, Italy
G	13	Makenna Shaffer-Lauer	6 ft 1 in (1.85 m)	Sr	Weber State	Greeley, Colorado
F	21	Kaliyah Murphy	6 ft 0 in (1.83 m)	So	Elizabeth Seton High School	Chandler, Arizona
G	22	Cali Denson	5 ft 8 in (1.73 m)	RS Jr	Oakland	Milwaukie, Oregon
F	23	Hayden Hearst	6 ft 4 in (1.93 m)	Fr	Legion Prep Academy	Mansfield, Texas
G	30	Crystal Henderson	5 ft 4 in (1.63 m)	Sr	Georgia State	Marietta, Georgia
F	33	Kyra Anderson	6 ft 1 in (1.85 m)	Jr	Tyler Junior College	Huntington, Texas

Head coach

- Chris Kielsmeier (Iowa State)

Assistant coach(es)

- Latoja Schaben (Toledo)
- Kevin Hackerott (St. Mary of the Plains)
- Evie Goetz (Louisiana Tech)
- Morgan Greene (Cal State East Bay)

Legend

- (C) Team captain
- (S) Suspended
- (I) Ineligible
- (W) Walk-on
- Injured
- Current redshirt

Roster

== Schedule and results ==
Date time, TV	Rank^{#}	Opponent^{#}	Result	Record	High points	High rebounds	High assists	Site (attendance) city, state
Exhibition
October 29, 2026*; 7:00 p.m.		UT Rio Grande Valley	W 76–43		–	–	–	Strahan Arena; San Marcos, TX
Regular season
November 4, 2026*; 7:00 p.m., Pac-12 YouTube		LIU	W 69–51	1-0	20 – Burks	7 – Fantroy	4 – Henderson	Strahan Arena (917); San Marcos, TX
November 7, 2026*; 4:30 p.m., NEC Front Row		at Chicago State	W 106–51	2-0	23 – Henderson	10 – Ceppelotti	6 – Henderson	Jones Convocation Center (342); Chicago, IL
November 13, 2026*; 11:30 a.m., YouTube		Texas A&M–Corpus Christi	W 63-47	3-0	26 – Burks	8 – Carr	3 – Fantroy	Strahan Arena (2,646); San Marcos, TX
November 17, 2026*; 6:00 p.m., ESPN+		at Incarnate Word						McDermott Center; San Antonio, TX
November 20, 2026*; 6:30 p.m., ESPN+		at Lamar						Montagne Center; Beaumont, TX
November 25, 2026*; 6:00 p.m., YouTube		Pacific; Texas State Tournament						Strahan Arena; San Marcos, TX
November 27, 2026*; 5:00 p.m., YouTube		Bradley; Texas State Tournament						Strahan Arena; San Marcos, TX
November 28, 2026*; 4:00 p.m., YouTube		UTEP; Texas State Tournament						Strahan Arena; San Marcos, TX
December 2, 2026*; 7:00 p.m., SLN		at North Dakota						Betty Engelstad Sioux Center; Grand Forks, ND
December 6, 2026*; 2:00 p.m., YouTube		Nevada						Strahan Arena; San Marcos, TX
December 13, 2026*; 2:00 p.m., YouTube		Prairie View A&M						Strahan Arena; San Marcos, TX
December 16, 2026*; 5:00 p.m., YouTube		UTSA; Rivalry						Strahan Arena; San Marcos, TX
December 19, 2026*; 2:30 p.m.		vs. Arkansas–Pine Bluff; Tulane Holiday Tournament						Devlin Fieldhouse; New Orleans, LA
December 20, 2026*; TBA		vs. Stonehill/Tulane; Tulane Holiday Tournament						Devlin Fieldhouse; New Orleans, LA
December 30, 2026*; 7:00 p.m., YouTube		Brown						Strahan Arena; San Marcos, TX
January 2, 2027*; 2:00 p.m., YouTube		Howard Payne						Strahan Arena; San Marcos, TX
Pac-12 regular season
January 6, 2027; 7:00 p.m., YouTube		Boise State						Strahan Arena; San Marcos, TX
January 9, 2027; 2:00 p.m.		at Washington State						Beasley Coliseum; Pullman, WA
January 13, 2027; 8:00 p.m.		at Gonzaga						McCarthey Athletic Center; Spokane, WA
January 20, 2027; 7:00 p.m., YouTube		Fresno State						Strahan Arena; San Marcos, TX
January 24, 2027; 11:00 a.m., The CW		San Diego State						Strahan Arena; San Marcos, TX
January 27, 2027; 7:30 p.m.		at Colorado State						Moby Arena; Fort Collis, CO
January 31, 2027; 2:00 p.m., YouTube		Washington State						Strahan Arena; San Marcos, TX
February 3, 2027; 8:00 p.m.		at Utah State						Smith Spectrum; Logan, UT
February 6, 2027; 3:00 p.m.		at Boise State						ExtraMile Arena; Boise, ID
February 10, 2027; 7:00 p.m., YouTube		Colorado State						Strahan Arena; San Marcos, TX
February 14, 2027; 2:00 p.m., YouTube		Oregon State						Strahan Arena; San Marcos, TX
February 17, 2027; 8:30 p.m.		at Fresno State						Save Mart Center; Fresno, CA
February 20, 2027; 2:00 p.m., YouTube		Utah State						Strahan Arena; San Marcos, TX
February 28, 2027; 4:00 p.m.		at Oregon State						Gill Coliseum; Corvallis, OR
March 3, 2027; 7:00 p.m., YouTube		Gonzaga						Strahan Arena; San Marcos, TX
March 6, 2027; 3:00 p.m.		at San Diego State						Viejas Arena; San Diego, CA
Pac-12 tournament
March 9–13, 2027; TBA		vs.						MGM Grand Garden Arena; Paradise, NV
*Non-conference game. ^{#}Rankings from AP Poll. (#) Tournament seedings in parentheses. All times are in Central.
