= 2026–27 Hawaii Rainbow Wahine basketball team =

American collegiate basketball season

2026–27 Hawaii Rainbow Wahine basketball
- Conference: Mountain West Conference
- Record: 1–3 (0–0 MW)
- Head coach: Khalilah Mitchell (1st season)
- Assistant coaches: Derrick Florence; Chris Straker; Mi'cole Cayton; Noah Brown
- Home arena: Stan Sheriff Center

2026–27 Mountain West Conference women's basketball standings
	Conf.				Overall
Team	W		L	PCT	W		L	PCT
Grand Canyon	0	–	0	–	3	–	0	1.000
UTEP	0	–	0	–	3	–	1	.750
Air Force	0	–	0	–	2	–	2	.500
UC Davis	0	–	0	–	2	–	2	.500
Wyoming	0	–	0	–	2	–	2	.500
San Jose State	0	–	0	–	1	–	2	.333
UNLV	0	–	0	–	1	–	2	.333
Hawai'i	0	–	0	–	1	–	3	.250
Nevada	0	–	0	–	1	–	3	.250
New Mexico	0	–	0	–	1	–	3	.250
† 2027 Mountain West tournament winner As of November 16, 2026

The 2026–27 Hawaii Rainbow Wahine basketball team represents the University of Hawaiʻi at Mānoa during the 2026–27 NCAA Division I women's basketball season. The Rainbow Wahine, led by first-year head coach Khalilah Mitchell, play their home games at the Stan Sheriff Center in Honolulu, Hawaii, as first year members of the Mountain West Conference.

== Previous season ==
The Rainbow Wahine finished the 2025–26 season 22–11, 16–4 in Big West play, to finish fourth place. As No. 4 seed in the Big West tournament where they defeated Cal State Fullerton in the quarterfinals and UC Irvine in the semifinals before losing in the championship game to UC San Diego.

At the conclusion of the season, Beeman retired from coaching.

The season marked the last as members of the Big West, as the school will join the Mountain West Conference on July 1, 2026.

== Offseason ==
=== Departures ===
Hawaii departures
Name	Num	Pos.	Height	Year	Hometown	Reason for departure
Kira-May Filemu	1	G	5'11"	Sophomore	Wattle Grove, Australia	Transferred to Cal State Northridge
Ella Collins	7	G	5'8"	Freshman	Canberra, Australia	Transferred to Robert Morris
Danijela Kujovic	10	F	6'1"	(redshirt) Freshman	Bulleen, Australia	Transferred to Long Beach State
Keiara Curtis	11	G	5'8"	Freshman	Seattle, WA	Transferred to New Mexico
Imani Perez	12	F	6'4"	Senior	Denver, CO	Graduated
Izzy Forsyth	20	G	6'0"	Senior	Vancouver, BC	Graduated
Saniyah Neverson	33	F	6'0"	Senior	Surprise, AZ	Graduated

=== Incoming transfers ===
Hawaii incoming transfers
Name	Num	Pos.	Height	Year	Hometown	Previous school
Elizabeth Udeze	1	G	5'6"	Junior	Victorville, CA	Mt. San Antonio College
Zyriah Price	7	G	6'0"	Junior	Huntsville, AL	Siena

==== Recruiting ====
There was no recruiting class of 2026.

== Roster ==
2026–27 Hawaii Rainbow Wahine women's basketball team
Players
Coaches

Pos.	#	Name	Height	Year	Previous school	Hometown
G	1	Liz Udeze	5 ft 6 in (1.68 m)	Jr	Mt. San Antonio College	Victorville, California
G	2	Teyahna Bond	5 ft 8 in (1.73 m)	So	St Monica's College	Cairns, Australia
G	3	Bailey Flavell	5 ft 10 in (1.78 m)	So	Takapuna Grammar School	Auckland, New Zealand
G	4	Jovi Lefotu	5 ft 8 in (1.73 m)	RS Sr	ʻIolani School	Kāneʻohe, Hawaii
G	5	Taryn Bond	5 ft 9 in (1.75 m)	Fr	St Monica's College	Cairns, Australia
G	6	Kyra Webb	6 ft 1 in (1.85 m)	Fr	Padua College	Melbourne, Australia
G	7	Zyriah Price	6 ft 0 in (1.83 m)	Jr	Siena	Huntsville, Alabama
F	8	Rebecca Moors	6 ft 2 in (1.88 m)	Jr	Westlake Girls High School	Auckland, New Zealand
F	17	Fiamma Serra	6 ft 4 in (1.93 m)	So	IIS G. Bertacchi	La Spezia, Italy
G	22	Jade Peacock	6 ft 0 in (1.83 m)	Sr	Hillcrest Christian College	Gold Coast, Australia
C	24	Ritorya Tamilo	6 ft 5 in (1.96 m)	Jr	Baradene College	Auckland, New Zealand
F	30	Payton Mills	6 ft 2 in (1.88 m)	Fr	Lynden High School	Lynden, Washington

Head coach

- Khalilah Mitchell (LSU)

Assistant coach(es)

- Derrick Florence (Morehouse)
- Chris Straker (San Diego State)
- Mi'cole Cayton (Pepperdine)
- Noah Brown (Tabor)

Legend

- (C) Team captain
- (S) Suspended
- (I) Ineligible
- (W) Walk-on
- Injured
- Current redshirt

Roster

== Schedule and results ==
Date time, TV	Rank^{#}	Opponent^{#}	Result	Record	High points	High rebounds	High assists	Site (attendance) city, state
Exhibition
October 21, 2026*; 7:00 p.m.		Hawaii Pacific	W 90–38		27 – Flavell	12 – Tamilo	3 – Tied	Stan Sheriff Center (327); Honolulu, HI
Non-conference regular season
November 2, 2026*; 1:00 p.m., B1G+		at Oregon	L 54–87	0–1	24 – Flavell	12 – Tamilo	3 – Lefotu	Matthew Knight Arena (3,856); Eugene, OR
November 5, 2026*; 10:00 a.m., ESPN+		at San Francisco	L 79–85 ^{OT}	0–2	27 – Tamilo	19 – Tamilo	5 – Lefotu	Sobrato Center (443); San Francisco, CA
November 13, 2026*; 11:00 a.m., KFVE/MW+		Saint Mary's; Bank of Hawaii Classic	W 93–89 ^{3OT}	1–2	24 – Tamilo	12 – Tied	5 – Tied	Stan Sheriff Center (2,217); Honolulu, HI
November 15, 2026*; 2:30 p.m., KFVE/MW+		Loyola Marymount; Bank of Hawaii Classic	L 49–59	1–3	14 – Tied	10 – Tamilo	4 – Lefotu	Stan Sheriff Center (1,679); Honolulu, HI
November 20, 2026*; 3:00 p.m.		vs. California; North Shore Showcase						George Q. Cannon Activities Center; Laie, HI
November 21, 2026*; 6:30 p.m.		vs. Gonzaga; North Shore Showcase						George Q. Cannon Activities Center; Laie, HI
November 27, 2026*; 12:00 p.m.		San Diego State; Rainbow Wahine Showdown						Stan Sheriff Center; Honolulu, HI
November 28, 2026*; 12:00 p.m.		Columbia; Rainbow Wahine Showdown						Stan Sheriff Center; Honolulu, HI
November 29, 2026*; 11:00 a.m.		Stanford; Rainbow Wahine Showdown						Stan Sheriff Center; Honolulu, HI
December 13, 2026*; 2:00 p.m.		Chaminade						Stan Sheriff Center; Honolulu, HI
December 20, 2026*; TBA		at Pepperdine						Firestone Fieldhouse; Malibu, CA
December 22, 2026*; 11:00 a.m.		at Fresno State						Save Mart Center; Fresno, CA
Mountain West regular season
December 30, 2026; TBA		Nevada						Stan Sheriff Center; Honolulu, HI
January 2, 2027; 12:00 p.m.		at UC Davis						University Credit Union Center; Davis, CA
January 6, 2027; 3:30 p.m., MW+		at Wyoming						Arena-Auditorium; Laramie, WY
January 9, 2027; TBA		at Air Force						Clune Arena; Colorado Springs, CO
January 13, 2027; TBA, MW+		New Mexico						Stan Sheriff Center; Honolulu, HI
January 16, 2027; TBA		UC Davis						Stan Sheriff Center; Honolulu, HI
January 20, 2027; 6:30 p.m.		at UNLV						Cox Pavilion; Paradise, NV
January 23, 2027; 10:00 a.m., MW+		at Grand Canyon						Global Credit Union Arena; Phoenix, AZ
January 30, 2027; TBA, MW+		San Jose State						Stan Sheriff Center; Honolulu, HI
February 3, 2027; 4:00 p.m., MW+		at New Mexico						The Pit; Albuquerque, NM
February 6, 2027; TBA		at UTEP						Don Haskins Center; El Paso, TX
February 10, 2027; TBA		Air Force						Stan Sheriff Center; Honolulu, HI
February 13, 2027; TBA, MW+		Grand Canyon						Stan Sheriff Center; Honolulu, HI
February 17, 2027; 5:00 p.m., MW+		at San Jose State						Provident Credit Union Event Center; San Jose, CA
February 20, 2027; 11:00 a.m., MW+		at Nevada						Lawlor Events Center; Reno, NV
February 24, 2027; TBA		Wyoming						Stan Sheriff Center; Honolulu, HI
February 27, 2027; TBA		UTEP						Stan Sheriff Center; Honolulu, HI
March 2, 2027; TBA		UNLV						Stan Sheriff Center; Honolulu, HI
Mountain West tournament
March 7–10, 2027; TBA		vs.						Thomas & Mack Center; Paradise, NV
*Non-conference game. ^{#}Rankings from AP Poll. (#) Tournament seedings in parentheses. All times are in Hawaii–Aleutian.
