= 2026–27 Colorado State Rams women's basketball team =

American collegiate basketball season

2026–27 Colorado State Rams women's basketball
- Conference: Pac-12 Conference
- Record: 2–2 (0–0 Pac-12)
- Head coach: Ryun Williams (15th season)
- Assistant coaches: Rico Burkett; Linda Sayavongchanh; Rachel Erickson; Annie Brady
- Home arena: Moby Arena

2026–27 Pac-12 Conference women's basketball standings
	Conf.				Overall
Team	W		L	PCT	W		L	PCT
Texas State	0	–	0	–	4	–	0	1.000
Boise State	0	–	0	–	4	–	1	.800
Fresno State	0	–	0	–	3	–	1	.750
Oregon State	0	–	0	–	3	–	2	.600
San Diego State	0	–	0	–	3	–	2	.600
Gonzaga	0	–	0	–	3	–	3	.500
Colorado State	0	–	0	–	2	–	2	.500
Washington State	0	–	0	–	2	–	3	.400
Utah State	0	–	0	–	2	–	4	.333
† 2027 Pac-12 Tournament winner As of November 20, 2026; Rankings from AP poll

The 2026–27 Colorado State Rams women's basketball team represented Colorado State University during the 2026–27 NCAA Division I women's basketball season. The Rams, led by fifteenth-year head coach Ryun Williams, played their home games at Moby Arena in Fort Collins, Colorado as new members of the Pac-12 Conference.

== Previous season ==
The Rams finished the 2025–26 season 27–8, 15–5 in Mountain West play to finish in a tie second place. As a No. 3 seed in the Mountain West tournament, they defeated Grand Canyon, UNLV and Air Force to win the tournament. They received an automatic bid to the NCAA tournament as a No. 12 seed in the Sacramento Region 4, where they lost in the first round to Michigan State.

This was Colorado State's last season as members of the Mountain West Conference, as they were to join the newly reformed Pac-12 Conference, effective July 1, 2026.

== Offseason ==
=== Departures ===
Colorado State departures
Name	Num	Pos.	Height	Year	Hometown	Reason for departure
Madelyn Bragg	0	F	6'3"	Senior	Aberdeen, SD	Graduated
Brooke Carlson	2	G	5'8"	Sophomore	Batavia, IL	Transferred to Washington
Lexus Bargesser	3	G	5'9"	Senior	Grass Lake, MI	Graduated
Jadyn Fife	5	F	6'0"	(redshirt) Junior	North Richland Hills, TX	Transferred to East Texas A&M
Lexi Deden	6	F	6'2"	Gradate student	Missoula, MT	Graduated
Marta Leimane	14	G	6'0"	Senior	Ventspils, Latvia	Graduated
Hannah Ronsiek	30	G	5'11"	Senior	Sioux Falls, SD	Graduated

=== Incoming transfers ===
Colorado State incoming transfers
Name	Num	Pos.	Height	Year	Hometown	Previous school
Camryn Runner	0	G	5'8"	Junior	Cicero, IN	Evansville
Anna Wikstrom	8	G	5'11'	Sophomore	Bergen, Norway	Duke
Heidur Karlsdottir	19	F/C	6'4"	Junior	Reykholt, Iceland	Wyoming
Maryn Archer	44	G	5'7"	(redshirt) Senior	Derby, KS	Arkansas
Sophie Sene	55	F/C	6'3"	Graduate student	Nice, France	Utah State

==== Recruiting ====
There was no recruiting class of 2026.

== Roster ==
2026–27 Colorado State Rams women's basketball team
Players
Coaches

Pos.	#	Name	Height	Year	Previous school	Hometown
G	0	Camryn Runner	5 ft 8 in (1.73 m)	Jr	Hamilton Heights High School; Evansville	Cicero, Indiana
G	3	Elsie Larsen	5 ft 10 in (1.78 m)	Fr	Strafford High School	Springfield, Missouri
G	4	Allie Roden	5 ft 10 in (1.78 m)	So	Clackamas High School	Clackamas, Oregon
G	5	Kloe Froebe	5 ft 10 in (1.78 m)	Jr	Lincoln Community High School	Lincoln, Illinois
G	8	Anna Wikstrom	5 ft 11 in (1.8 m)	So	Ulriken Eagles; Duke	Bergen, Norway
F	9	Emilie Borges-Michaelsen	6 ft 2 in (1.88 m)	Fr	Rungsted Gymnasium	Copenhagen, Denmark
G/F	10	Bree Bowman	6 ft 0 in (1.83 m)	RS Fr	Prior Lake High School	Prior Lake, Minnesota
G	11	Gianna Smith	5 ft 11 in (1.8 m)	So	Arapahoe High School	Littleton, Colorado
F	12	Kyla Hollier	6 ft 2 in (1.88 m)	Fr	Roosevelt High School	Johnstown, Colorado
F/C	19	Heidur Karlsdottir	6 ft 4 in (1.93 m)	Jr	Fjölnir; Wyoming	Reykholt, Iceland
G	23	Caitlin Kramer	6 ft 3 in (1.91 m)	RS So	Air Academy High School	Colorado Springs, Colorado
F	24	Olivia Pawlicki	6 ft 1 in (1.85 m)	RS So	Shakopee High School	Shakopee, Minnesota
G	31	McKenna Murphy	5 ft 11 in (1.8 m)	RS So	Elkhorn North High School	Omaha, Nebraska
G	44	Maryn Archer	5 ft 7 in (1.7 m)	RS Sr	Derby High School; Arkansas	Derby, Kansas
F	55	Sophie Sene	6 ft 3 in (1.91 m)	GS	Lycee Hector Berlioz; Utah State	Nice, France

Head coach

- Ryun Williams (South Dakota)

Assistant coach(es)

- Rico Burkett (North Dakota)
- Linda Sayavongchanh (Drake)
- Rachel Erickson (Black Hills State)
- Annie Brady (Colorado State)

Legend

- (C) Team captain
- (S) Suspended
- (I) Ineligible
- (W) Walk-on
- Injured
- Current redshirt

Roster

== Schedule and results ==
Date time, TV	Rank^{#}	Opponent^{#}	Result	Record	High points	High rebounds	High assists	Site (attendance) city, state
Exhibition
October 28, 2026*; 6:30 p.m.		Chadron State	W 109-38		21 – Runner	7 – Sene	5 – Tied	Moby Arena (1,683); Fort Collins, CO
Non-conference regular season
November 2, 2026*; 5:30 p.m., YouTube		Lindenwood	W 63–48	1–0	14 – Kramer	11 – Kramer	5 – Tied	Moby Arena; Fort Collins, CO
November 6, 2026*; 7:00 p.m., ESPN+		at Utah	L 63–72	1–1	23 – Runner	6 – Kramer	2 – Runner	Jon M. Huntsman Center (1,728); Salt Lake City, UT
November 10, 2026*; 6:00 p.m., ESPN+		at Denver	W 86–50	2–1	20 – Runner	6 – Kramer	4 – Froebe	Hamilton Gymnasium (602); Denver, CO
November 13, 2026*; 6:30 p.m., YouTube		Wyoming; Border War	L 55–58	2–2	21 – Murphy	9 – Froebe	4 – Froebe	Moby Arena (2,019); Fort Collins, CO
November 20, 2026*; 6:30 p.m., YouTube		Harvard						Moby Arena; Fort Collins, CO
November 22, 2026*; 1:00 p.m., YouTube		Weber State						Moby Arena; Fort Collins, CO
November 26, 2026*; 1:00 p.m., ESPN+		vs. Grambling State; Paradise Jam Harbor Division semifinal						UVI Sports and Fitness Center; Charlotte Amalie, USVI
November 27, 2026*; 10:30 a.m./1:00 p.m., ESPN+		vs. Little Rock/Tennessee Tech; Paradise Jam Harbor Division						UVI Sports and Fitness Center; Charlotte Amalie, USVI
December 5, 2026*; 6:30 p.m., YouTube		Southern						Moby Arena; Fort Collins, CO
December 12, 2026*; 2:15 p.m.		vs. Troy; San Diego MTE						Jenny Craig Pavilion; San Diego, CA
December 13, 2026*; 4:30 p.m.		vs. Arizona State; San Diego MTE						Jenny Craig Pavilion; San Diego, CA
December 19, 2026*; 1:00 p.m., YouTube		Northern Colorado						Moby Arena; Fort Collins, CO
December 23, 2026*; 11:00 a.m., ESPN+		at Loyola Chicago						Joseph J. Gentile Arena; Chicago, IL
December 30, 2026*; 6:30 p.m., YouTube		South Dakota Mines						Moby Arena; Fort Collins, CO
Pac-12 regular season
January 7, 2027; 6:30 p.m., YouTube		Fresno State						Moby Arena; Fort Collins, CO
January 13, 2027; 7:00 p.m., YouTube		at Utah State						Smith Spectrum; Logan, UT
January 16, 2027; 7:00 p.m., The CW		San Diego State						Moby Arena; Fort Collins, CO
January 20, 2027; 7:00 p.m., YouTube		at Washington State						Beasley Coliseum; Pullman, WA
January 24, 2027; TBA		at Boise State						ExtraMile Arena; Boise, ID
January 27, 2027; TBA		Texas State						Moby Arena; Fort Collins, CO
January 31, 2027; 1:00 p.m., The CW		at San Diego State						Viejas Arena; San Diego, CA
February 3, 2027; 8:00 p.m., USA		Gonzaga						Moby Arena; Fort Collins, CO
February 7, 2027; TBA		at Fresno State						Save Mart Center; Fresno, CA
February 10, 2027; TBA		at Texas State						Strahan Arena; San Marcos, TX
February 14, 2027; 11:30 a.m., The CW		Washington State						Moby Arena; Fort Collins, CO
February 17, 2027; TBA		Utah State						Moby Arena; Fort Collins, CO
February 21, 2027; 12:00 p.m., The CW		at Oregon State						Gill Coliseum; Corvallis, OR
February 24, 2027; 8:00 p.m., USA		at Gonzaga						McCarthey Athletic Center; Spokane, WA
March 3, 2027; TBA		Boise State						Moby Arena; Fort Collins, CO
March 6, 2027; TBA		Oregon State						Moby Arena; Fort Collins, CO
Pac-12 Women's Tournament
March 9–13, 2027; TBA		vs.						MGM Grand Garden Arena; Paradise, NV
*Non-conference game. ^{#}Rankings from AP Poll. (#) Tournament seedings in parentheses. All times are in Mountain Time.

== See also ==
- 2026–27 Colorado State Rams men's basketball team
