= 2026–27 Utah Tech Trailblazers women's basketball team =

American college basketball season

2026–27 Utah Tech Trailblazers women's basketball
- Conference: Western Athletic Conference
- Record: 2-2 (0–0 Big Sky)
- Head coach: Adam Wardenburg (1st season)
- Assistant coaches: Lauren Brocke; Jessica Richardson; McKenzie Johnston
- Home arena: Burns Arena

2026–27 Big Sky women's basketball standings
	Conf.				Overall
Team	W		L	PCT	W		L	PCT
Weber State	0	–	0	–	3	–	0	1.000
Montana State	0	–	0	–	2	–	0	1.000
Idaho State	0	–	0	–	3	–	1	.750
Northern Colorado	0	–	0	–	3	–	1	.750
Idaho	0	–	0	–	2	–	1	.667
Utah Tech	0	–	0	–	2	–	1	.667
Eastern Washington	0	–	0	–	2	–	2	.500
Southern Utah	0	–	0	–	2	–	2	.500
Montana	0	–	0	–	1	–	3	.250
Northern Arizona	0	–	0	–	0	–	3	.000
Portland State	0	–	0	–	0	–	4	.000
† 2027 Big Sky tournament winner As of November 15, 2026

The 2026–27 Utah Tech Trailblazers women's basketball team will represent Utah Tech University during the 2026–27 NCAA Division I women's basketball season. The Trailblazers, led by first-year head coach Adam Wardenburg, will play their home games at Burns Arena in St. George, Utah, and compete as a first-year member of the Big Sky Conference.

== Previous season ==
The Trailblazers finished the 2025–26 season 9–20 overall and 4–14 in WAC play, finishing in a tie for last in the conference with UT Arlington. As the No. 7 seed in the WAC tournament, they lost 73–77 in the first round to the No. 6 seeded Mavericks to end their season. This was Utah Tech's last season in the Western Athletic Conference, as they became a member of the Big Sky Conference on July 1.

On April 2, 2026, the university announced that head coach JD Gustin would not be returning the following season, ending his tenure after ten seasons with the program. On April 21, Air Force associated head coach Adam Wardenburg was hired as the program's new head coach. In the 2025–26 season, Wardenburg helped lead the Falcons to a 16–19 record, including an unprecedented run to the Mountain West championship game as the No. 9 seed.

== Offseason ==
=== Departures ===
Utah Tech departures
Name	Number	Pos.	Height	Year	Hometown	Reason for departure
Maddie Warren	1	Guard	5'10"	(redshirt) Senior	Lehi, UT	Graduated
Maci Warren	2	Guard	5'10"	(redshirt) Senior	Lehi, UT	Graduated
Calyn Dallas	3	Guard	6'1"	Junior	Lubbock, TX	Transferred to Texas Woman's (D-II)
Brie Crittendon	4	Guard	5'10"	(redshirt) Senior	Union, KY	Graduated
Chardonnay Hartley	5	Guard	5'3"	Senior	Harlem, NY	Graduated
Andjela Colic	10	Guard	5'7"	(redshirt) Freshman	Belgrade, Serbia	Transferred to UIndy (D-II)
Paige Cofer	11	Forward	6'0"	Sophomore	Eagle, ID	Transferred to Rice
Merceius Mili	20	Guard/Forward	6'1"	Freshman	Lehi, UT	Transferred to Wyoming
Kaylee Borden	21	Guard	5'6"	(redshirt) Senior	Anadarko, OK	Graduated
Rose Boisnel	22	Forward	6'1"	Freshman	Caen, France	Transferred to Tarleton State
Lauren Crocker	24	Forward	6'4"	Junior	Calgary, Alberta	Transferred to Utah Valley
Annalyse Shimada	25	Forward	6'0"	Freshman	Kanarraville, UT	Left team, transitioned to Utah Tech volleyball team

=== Incoming transfers ===
Utah Tech incoming transfers
Name	Number	Pos.	Height	Year	Hometown	Previous school
Ava Smith	3	Guard	5'8"	Junior	Camas, WA	Bellarmine
Sophia Zufelt	4	Guard	5'7"	Junior	Coeur d'Alene, ID	UTRGV
Aubrey Cook	8	Center	6'4"	Sophomore	Parker, CO	San Diego State
Calyn Wood	14	Guard	5'8"	Senior	Idaho Falls, ID	Southern Idaho (NJCAA)
Maia Rhay	15	Guard	5'8"	Junior	Draper, UT	Western Wyoming CC (NJCAA)
Savannah Stoker	21	Forward	5'9"	Junior	Winnemucca, NV	Southern Idaho (NJCAA)
Maci Hess	22	Forward	5'10"	Sophomore	Gilbert, AZ	Southern Idaho (NJCAA)
Kendall Dykstra	35	Guard	5'11"	Sophomore	Rocklin, CA	Valdosta State (D-II)

=== Recruiting class ===
There was no 2026 recruiting class.

== Roster ==
2026–27 Utah Tech Trailblazers women's basketball team
Players
Coaches

Pos.	#	Name	Height	Year	Previous school	Hometown
G	0	Ella Seymore	5 ft 11 in (1.8 m)	Fr	Westlake High School	Saratoga Springs, UT
F	1	Kyara Vargas	6 ft 2 in (1.88 m)	Fr	Canyon High School	Santa Ana, CA
G	3	Ava Smith	5 ft 8 in (1.73 m)	Jr	Union High School; Bellarmine	Camas, WA
G	4	Sophia Zufelt	5 ft 7 in (1.7 m)	Jr	Lake City High School; UTRGV	Coeur d'Alene, ID
C	7	Eva Woodward	6 ft 6 in (1.98 m)	Fr	Argyle Secondary School	North Vancouver, British Columbia
C	8	Aubrey Cook	6 ft 4 in (1.93 m)	So	Legend High School; San Diego State	Parker, CO
G	9	Alyssa Bowen	6 ft 0 in (1.83 m)	Fr	Mundaring Christian College	Perth, Australia
G	12	Ellie Taylor	5 ft 10 in (1.78 m)	Jr	Copper Hills High School	West Jordan, UT
G	14	Calyn Wood	5 ft 8 in (1.73 m)	Sr	Idaho Falls High School; College of Southern Idaho	Idaho Falls, ID
G	15	Maia Rhay	5 ft 8 in (1.73 m)	Jr	Corner Canyon High School; Western Wyoming CC	Draper, UT
F	21	Savannah Stoker	5 ft 9 in (1.75 m)	Jr	Lowry High School; College of Southern Idaho	Winnemucca, NV
F	22	Maci Hess	5 ft 10 in (1.78 m)	So	Perry High School; College of Southern Idaho	Gilbert, AZ
G	33	Gabby Gomez	5 ft 7 in (1.7 m)	Fr	Cedar High School	Cedar City, UT
G	35	Kendall Dykstra	5 ft 11 in (1.8 m)	So	Whitney High School; Valdosta State	Rocklin, CA

Head coach

- Adam Wardenburg (Utah State)

Assistant coach(es)

- Lauren Brocke (Colorado State)
- Jessica Richardson (Southern Utah)
- McKenzie Johnston (Montana)

Legend

- (C) Team captain
- (S) Suspended
- (I) Ineligible
- (W) Walk-on
- Injured
- Current redshirt

Roster
Last update: October 12, 2026

== Schedule and results ==
Date time, TV	Rank^{#}	Opponent^{#}	Result	Record	High points	High rebounds	High assists	Site (attendance) city, state
Regular season
November 2, 2026*; 11:00 a.m., ESPN+		Life Pacific	W 107-39	1-0	25 – Zufelt	13 – Woodward	7 – Smith	Burns Arena (841); St. George, UT
November 6, 2026*; 6:00 p.m., ESPN+		California Baptist	L 60-87	1-1	22 – Stoker	8 – Smith	4 – Smith	Burns Arena (350); St. George, UT
November 11, 2026*; 7:00 p.m., ESPN+		Nelson AIC	W 133-47	2-1	23 – Stoker	10 – Cook	5 – Rhay	Burns Arena (533); St. George, UT
November 15, 2026*; 1:00 p.m., YouTube		at Boise State	L 72-85	2-2	24 – Stoker	6 – Dykstra	3 – Smith	ExtraMile Arena (1,970); Boise, ID
November 18, 2026*; 7:30 p.m.		at Cal State Bakersfield						Icardo Center; Bakersfield, CA
November 20, 2026*; 7:00 p.m.		at UC Santa Barbara						The Thunderdome; Santa Barbara, CA
November 25, 2026*; 7:00 p.m.		San Diego						Burns Arena; St. George, UT
November 30, 2026*; 7:00 p.m.		Park–Gilbert						Burns Arena; St. George, UT
December 3, 2026; 6:00 p.m.		at Weber State						Dee Events Center; Ogden, UT
December 5, 2026; 2:00 p.m.		at Idaho State						Reed Gym; Pocatello, ID
December 12, 2026*; 1:00 p.m.		Houston Christian						Burns Arena; St. George, UT
December 15, 2026*; 4:00 p.m.		at Colorado						CU Events Center; Boulder, CO
December 19, 2026*; 1:00 p.m.		Cal Poly						Burns Arena; St. George, UT
December 21, 2026*; 1:00 p.m.		La Sierra						Burns Arena; St. George, UT
December 31, 2026; 2:00 p.m.		Idaho						Burns Arena; St. George, UT
January 2, 2027; 1:00 p.m.		Eastern Washington						Burns Arena; St. George, UT
January 7, 2027; 8:00 p.m.		at Portland State						Viking Pavilion; Portland, OR
January 9, 2027; 2:00 p.m.		at Northern Colorado						Bank of Colorado Arena; Greeley, CO
January 14, 2027; 7:00 p.m.		Northern Arizona						Burns Arena; St. George, UT
January 16, 2027; 2:00 p.m.		at Southern Utah						America First Events Center; Cedar City, UT
January 18, 2027; 2:00 p.m.		at Montana						Dahlberg Arena; Missoula, MT
January 25, 2027; 7:00 p.m.		Montana State						Burns Arena; St. George, UT
January 28, 2027; 7:00 p.m.		Idaho State						Burns Arena; St. George, UT
January 30, 2027; 1:00 p.m.		Weber State						Burns Arena; St. George, UT
February 4, 2027; 12:00 p.m.		at Eastern Washington						Reese Court; Cheney, WA
February 6, 2027; 3:00 p.m.		at Idaho						ICCU Arena; Moscow, ID
February 11, 2027; 6:00 p.m.		at Northern Arizona						Rolle Activity Center; Flagstaff, AZ
February 13, 2027; 1:00 p.m.		Southern Utah						Burns Arena; St. George, UT
February 17, 2027; 7:00 p.m.		Northern Colorado						Burns Arena; St. George, UT
February 20, 2027; 1:00 p.m.		Portland State						Burns Arena; St. George, UT
February 22, 2027; 1:00 p.m.		Montana						Burns Arena; St. George, UT
March 1, 2027; 7:00 p.m.		at Montana State						Worthington Arena; Bozeman, MT
Big Sky tournament
March 5–10, 2027; TBA		vs.						Idaho Central Arena; Boise, ID
*Non-conference game. ^{#}Rankings from AP Poll. (#) Tournament seedings in parentheses. All times are in Mountain.
