= 2026–27 Oregon State Beavers women's basketball team =

American college basketball season

2026–27 Oregon State Beavers women's basketball
- Conference: Pac-12 Conference
- Record: 4–2 (0–0 Pac-12)
- Head coach: Scott Rueck (17th season)
- Assistant coaches: Deven Hunter; Sydney Wiese; Eric Ely; Jared Vedus
- Home arena: Gill Coliseum

2026–27 Pac-12 Conference women's basketball standings
	Conf.				Overall
Team	W		L	PCT	W		L	PCT
Texas State	0	–	0	–	5	–	0	1.000
Boise State	0	–	0	–	4	–	1	.800
Fresno State	0	–	0	–	3	–	1	.750
Oregon State	0	–	0	–	3	–	2	.600
San Diego State	0	–	0	–	3	–	2	.600
Gonzaga	0	–	0	–	3	–	3	.500
Colorado State	0	–	0	–	2	–	3	.400
Washington State	0	–	0	–	2	–	3	.400
Utah State	0	–	0	–	2	–	4	.333
† 2027 Pac-12 Tournament winner As of November 22, 2026; Rankings from AP poll

The 2026–27 Oregon State Beavers women's basketball team represents Oregon State University during the 2026–27 NCAA Division I women's basketball season. The Beavers, led by 17th-year head coach Scott Rueck, play their home games at Gill Coliseum in Corvallis, Oregon as members of the newly Pac-12 Conference.

== Previous season ==
The Beavers finished the 2025–26 season 23–12, 13–5 in WCC play, to finish in a tie for third place. As an No. 4 seed in the West Coast Conference tournament where they defeated Portland in the quarterfinals and Loyola Marymount in the semifinals before losing to Gonzaga in the championship game. They received an at-large bid to the WBIT in the Utah bracket where they lost in the first round to Wisconsin.

This season will mark Oregon State's last season as associate members of the West Coast Conference, as they will be rejoining the newly reformed Pac-12 Conference, effective July 1, 2026.

== Offseason ==
=== Departures ===
Oregon State departures
Name	Num	Pos.	Height	Year	Hometown	Reason for departure
Tiara Bolden	0	G	5'11"	Senior	Eugene, OR	Graduated
Lucia Navarro	7	G	6'0"	Junior	Valencia, Spain	Transferred to Tarleton State
Susana Yepes	10	F	6'0"	(redshirt) Senior	Medellín, Colombia	Graduated
Lizzy Williamson	15	F	6'5"	Senior	Adelaide, Australia	Graduated
Elisa Mehyar	16	F	6'5"	Sophomore	Copenhagen, Denmark	Transferred to Middle Tennessee
Cloe Vecina	31	G	5'8"	Sophomore	Vigo, Spain	Transferred to Yale
Néné Sow	32	C	6'8"	(redshirt) Senior	Brussels, Belgium	Graduated

=== Incoming transfers ===
Oregon State incoming transfers
Name	Num	Pos.	Height	Year	Hometown	Previous school
Maria Ignatchenko	21	F	6'4"	Junior	Mykolaiv, Ukraine	Salt Lake CC

==== 2026 recruiting class ====
College recruiting
Name	Hometown	School	Height	Weight	Commit date
Taylor Young; G	Central Point, OR	Crater High School	5 ft 11 in (1.80 m)	N/A	
Taylor Young; G	Recruit ratings: ESPN: (92)				
Overall recruit ranking:
Note: In many cases, Scout, Rivals, 247Sports, On3, and ESPN may conflict in their listings of height and weight.; In these cases, the average was taken. ESPN grades are on a 100-point scale.; Sources: "2026 Player Commits". ESPN. Archived from the original on September 5, 2026.

==== 2027 recruiting class ====
College recruiting (2027)
Name	Hometown	School	Height	Weight	Commit date
Berkley Jones; F	Eagle, ID	Eagle High School	5 ft 10 in (1.78 m)	N/A	
Berkley Jones; F	Recruit ratings: ESPN: (94)				
Overall recruit ranking:
Note: In many cases, Scout, Rivals, 247Sports, On3, and ESPN may conflict in their listings of height and weight.; In these cases, the average was taken. ESPN grades are on a 100-point scale.; Sources: "2027 Player Commits". ESPN. Archived from the original on August 30, 2026.

== Roster ==
2026–27 Oregon State Beavers women's basketball team
Players
Coaches

Pos.	#	Name	Height	Year	Previous school	Hometown
G	1	Kennedie Shuler	5 ft 10 in (1.78 m)	Sr	Barlow High School	Gresham, Oregon
G	2	Katelyn Field	5 ft 11 in (1.8 m)	So	Casey Cavaliers	Melbourne, Australia
G	3	Jenna Villa	6 ft 1 in (1.85 m)	Sr	Washington State	Arlington, Washington
G	4	Ally Schimel	5 ft 10 in (1.78 m)	Jr	Corbett School	Corbett, Oregon
F	5	Maggie Warpus	6 ft 3 in (1.91 m)	Fr	Chenango Forks High School	Chenango Forks, New York
G	10	Ashley Uusitalo	5 ft 9 in (1.75 m)	Fr	Lake Washington High School	Lake Washington, Washington
G	12	Mackenzie Shivers	5 ft 6 in (1.68 m)	RS Sr	Mesa Community College	Mesa, Arizona
F	21	Mariia Ignatchenko	6 ft 4 in (1.93 m)	Fr	Salt Lake Community College	Mykolaiv, Ukraine
F	22	Lara Alonso-Basurto	6 ft 3 in (1.91 m)	So	Distrito Olimpico	Madrid, Spain
G	25	Keira Lindemans	6 ft 0 in (1.83 m)	So	Bulleen Boomers	Melbourne, Australia
G	30	Catarina Ferreira	6 ft 0 in (1.83 m)	GS	Baylor	São Paulo, Brazil
G	53	Taylor Young	5 ft 9 in (1.75 m)	Fr	Crater High School	Central Point, Oregon

Head coach

- Scott Rueck (Oregon State)

Assistant coach(es)

- Deven Hunter (Oregon State)
- Sydney Wiese (Oregon State)
- Eric Ely (Northwest Nazarene)
- Jared Vedus (Oregon State)

Legend

- (C) Team captain
- (S) Suspended
- (I) Ineligible
- (W) Walk-on
- Injured
- Current redshirt

Roster
Last update: January 6, 2026

== Schedule and results ==
Date time, TV	Rank^{#}	Opponent^{#}	Result	Record	High points	High rebounds	High assists	Site (attendance) city, state
Exhibition
November 1, 2026*; 2:00 p.m.		Seattle Pacific	W 80–48		–	–	–	Gill Coliseum; Corvallis, OR
Non-conference regular season
November 4, 2026*; 6:00 p.m., YouTube		California Baptist	L 77–79	0–1	22 – Young	11 – Alonso	7 – Shuler	Gill Coliseum (2,859); Corvallis, OR
November 8, 2026*; 2:00 p.m., YouTube		Eastern Washington	W 85–64	1–1	33 – Villa	7 – Villa	7 – Shuler	Gill Coliseum (3,086); Corvallis, OR
November 11, 2026*; 6:00 p.m., YouTube		Northwest Nazarene	W 77–53	2–1	15 – Shuler	11 – Tied	7 – Shuler	Gill Coliseum (2,994); Corvallis, OR
November 15, 2026*; 6:00 p.m., ESPN+		at Arizona	L 80–84 ^{OT}	2–2	23 – Shuler	10 – Shuler	6 – Shuler	McKale Center (4,717); Tucson, AZ
November 18, 2026*; 11:00 a.m., YouTube		UC Riverside	W 64–57	3–2	18 – Shuler	8 – Shuler	9 – Shuler	Gill Coliseum (7,665); Corvallis, OR
November 21, 2026*; 12:00 p.m., YouTube		Fairfield	W 71–60	4–2	19 – Shivers	7 – Villa	5 – Young	Gill Coliseum (3,045); Corvallis, OR
November 23, 2026*; 9:00 a.m.		vs. Middle Tennessee; Jacksonville Classic						The Reef; Jacksonville, FL
November 25, 2026*; 3:30 p.m.		vs. Vanderbilt; Jacksonville Classic						The Reef; Jacksonville, FL
November 30, 2026*; 6:00 p.m., YouTube		Southern						Gill Coliseum; Corvallis, OR
December 5, 2026*; 1:30 p.m., The CW		BYU						Gill Coliseum; Corvallis, OR
December 13, 2026*; 1:00 p.m., The CW		Oregon; Rivalry						Gill Coliseum; Corvallis, OR
December 18, 2026*; 7:00 p.m.		vs. Idaho State; Maui Classic						Seabury Hall; Makawao, HI
December 19, 2026*; 8:00 p.m.		vs. Ball State; Maui Classic						Seabury Hall; Makawao, HI
December 29, 2026*; 4:00 p.m., ESPN+		at Columbia						Levien Gymnasium; New York, NY
January 1, 2027*; 10:00 a.m., ESPN+		at Princeton						Jadwin Gymnasium; Princeton, NJ
Pac-12 regular season
January 6, 2027; 6:00 p.m., SWX		at Gonzaga						McCarthey Athletic Center; Spokane, WA
January 9, 2027; 8:00 p.m., The CW		at Utah State						Smith Spectrum; Logan, UT
January 13, 2027; 7:00 p.m., USA		San Diego State						Gill Coliseum; Corvallis, OR
January 17, 2027; 1:00 p.m., The CW		Washington State						Gill Coliseum; Corvallis, OR
January 23, 2027; 8:00 p.m., The CW		at Fresno State						Save Mart Center; Fresno, CA
January 27, 2027; 6:00 p.m., YouTube		Boise State						Gill Coliseum; Corvallis, OR
January 30, 2027; 2:00 p.m., YouTube		Utah State						Gill Coliseum; Corvallis, OR
February 7, 2027; 1:00 p.m., The CW		at Washington State						Beasley Coliseum; Pullman, WA
February 11, 2027; 8:00 p.m., USA		Gonzaga						Gill Coliseum; Corvallis, OR
February 13, 2027; 2:00 p.m., YouTube		at Texas State						Strahan Arena; San Marcos, TX
February 17, 2027; 6:00 p.m., YouTube		at San Diego State						Viejas Arena; San Diego, CA
February 21, 2027; 11:00 a.m., The CW		Colorado State						Gill Coliseum; Corvallis, OR
February 24, 2027; 6:30 p.m., YouTube		at Boise State						ExtraMile Arena; Boise, ID
February 28, 2027; 2:00 p.m., YouTube		Texas State						Gill Coliseum; Corvallis, OR
March 3, 2027; 6:00 p.m., YouTube		Fresno State						Gill Coliseum; Corvallis, OR
March 6, 2027; 5:30 p.m., YouTube		at Colorado State						Moby Arena; Fort Collins, CO
Pac-12 tournament
*Non-conference game. ^{#}Rankings from AP Poll. (#) Tournament seedings in parentheses. All times are in Pacific.
