= 2026–27 Boise State Broncos women's basketball team =

American collegiate basketball season

2026–27 Boise State Broncos women's basketball
- Conference: Pac-12 Conference
- Record: 4–1 (0–0 Pac-12)
- Head coach: Gordy Presnell (22nd season)
- Assistant coaches: Heather Sower; Cariann Ramirez; Mike Petrino; Jackie Robinson
- Home arena: ExtraMile Arena

2026–27 Pac-12 Conference women's basketball standings
	Conf.				Overall
Team	W		L	PCT	W		L	PCT
Texas State	0	–	0	–	4	–	0	1.000
Boise State	0	–	0	–	4	–	1	.800
Fresno State	0	–	0	–	3	–	1	.750
Oregon State	0	–	0	–	3	–	2	.600
San Diego State	0	–	0	–	3	–	2	.600
Gonzaga	0	–	0	–	3	–	3	.500
Colorado State	0	–	0	–	2	–	2	.500
Washington State	0	–	0	–	2	–	3	.400
Utah State	0	–	0	–	2	–	4	.333
† 2027 Pac-12 Tournament winner As of November 20, 2026; Rankings from AP poll

The 2026–27 Boise State Broncos women's basketball team represents Boise State University during the 2026–27 NCAA Division I women's basketball season. The Broncos, led by twenty-second year head coach Gordy Presnell, play their home games at ExtraMile Arena in Boise, Idaho, as first-year members of the Pac-12 Conference.

== Previous season ==
The Broncos finished the 2025–26 season 25–9, 14–6 in Mountain West play, to finish in a tie for fourth place. As a No. 5 seed in the Mountain West tournament, they defeated San Jose State in the first round and New Mexico in the quarterfinals before losing to Air Force in the semifinals. Despite having 25 wins, they were not invited to the postseason tournament.

This was Boise State's last season as members of the Mountain West Conference, as they were to join the newly reformed Pac-12 Conference, effective July 1, 2026.

== Offseason ==
=== Departures ===
Boise State departures
Name	Num	Pos.	Height	Year	Hometown	Reason for departure
Tatum Thompson	0	F	6'1"	Senior	Woodinville, WA	Graduated
Emily Howard	2	C	6'5	(redshirt) Junior	Vancouver, BC	Transferred to Ole Miss
Dani Bayes	4	G	5'11"	Senior	Brisbane, Australia	Graduated
Mya Hansen	14	G	5'9"	Senior	Billings, MT	Graduated
Josee Steadman	25	F	5'11"	(redshirt) Senior	Blackfoot, ID	Graduated
Natalie Pasco	32	G	5'10"	Senior	Danville, CA	Graduated

=== Incoming transfers ===
Boise State incoming transfers
Name	Num	Pos.	Height	Year	Hometown	Previous school
CJ Latta	0	G	5'10"	Junior	Paul, ID	San Diego State
Grace Foster	2	G	5'10"	Junior	Perth, Australia	Utah

==== Recruiting ====
There was no recruiting class of 2026.

== Roster ==
2026–27 Boise State Broncos women's basketball team
Players
Coaches

Pos.	#	Name	Height	Year	Previous school	Hometown
G	0	CJ Latta	5 ft 10 in (1.78 m)	Jr	Minico HS; San Diego State	Paul, ID
G	2	Grace Foster	5 ft 10 in (1.78 m)	Jr	Willetton Tigers; Utah	Perth, Australia
G	3	Morgan Maldonado	5 ft 9 in (1.75 m)	So	Mountain City Christian Academy	Anchorage, AK
F	5	Paige Gilpatrick	6 ft 3 in (1.91 m)	Fr	Broomfield HS	Broomfield, CO
G	6	Milly Sharp	5 ft 9 in (1.75 m)	Jr	Ballarat Miners	Ballarat, Australia
F	7	Izzie Harms	6 ft 1 in (1.85 m)	Jr	Willamette HS	Eugene, OR
F	9	Libby Hutton	6 ft 0 in (1.83 m)	Jr	Perry Lakes Hawks	Perth, Australia
C	10	Madeline Cooke (7th)	6 ft 3 in (1.91 m)	GS	Cole Valley Chrisitan HS; The Master's	Merdian, ID
G	11	Zia-Daye Anderson	5 ft 7 in (1.7 m)	Fr	Nathan Hale HS	Mukilteo, WA
G	13	Mason Quinn	6 ft 3 in (1.91 m)	Fr	Frechtown HS	Frenchtown, MT
C	15	Emerson McCrea	6 ft 4 in (1.93 m)	Fr	Illawarra Hawks	Wollongong, Australia
F	21	Mason Borcherding	6 ft 1 in (1.85 m)	So	Legend HS	Parker, CO
C	22	Kenna Garza	6 ft 2 in (1.88 m)	So	Pocatello HS	Pocatello, ID
G	24	Jayda Lewis	5 ft 10 in (1.78 m)	So	Garfield HS	Seattle, WA
G	35	Keirra Thompson	5 ft 8 in (1.73 m)	So	Camas HS	Camas, WA

Head coach

- Gordy Presnell (Northwest Nazarene)

Assistant coach(es)

- Heather Sower (Boise State)
- Cariann Ramirez (Boise State)
- Mike Petrino (Montana State Billings)
- Jackie Robinson (Evergreen State)

Legend

- (C) Team captain
- (S) Suspended
- (I) Ineligible
- (W) Walk-on
- (7th) Seventh-year senior
- Injured
- Current redshirt

Roster

== Schedule and results ==
Date time, TV	Rank^{#}	Opponent^{#}	Result	Record	High points	High rebounds	High assists	Site (attendance) city, state
Non-conference regular season
November 2, 2026*; 11:00 a.m., YouTube		Bushnell	W 84–48	1–0	21 – Latta	10 – Borcherding	4 – Anderson	ExtraMile Arena (3,764); Boise, ID
November 6, 2026*; 6:30 p.m., YouTube		Portland State	W 83–68	2–0	16 – Hutton	5 – Tied	3 – Tied	ExtraMile Arena (1,773); Boise, ID
November 10, 2026*; 6:30 p.m., YouTube		Cal State Northridge	W 82–59	3–0	16 – Harms	9 – Anderson	7 – Anderson	ExtraMile Arena (1,540); Boise, ID
November 13, 2026*; 6:30 p.m., YouTube		Utah	L 47–78	3–1	12 – Anderson	5 – Maldonado	2 – Anderson	ExtraMile Arena (2,097); Boise, ID
November 15, 2026*; 1:00 p.m., YouTube		Utah Tech	W 85–72	4–1	26 – Maldonado	12 – Quinn	3 – Tied	ExtraMile Arena (1,970); Boise, ID
November 22, 2026*; 2:00 p.m., YouTube		UC Davis						ExtraMile Arena; Boise, ID
November 26, 2026*; 8:00 a.m., BallerTV		vs. Stetson; Daytona Beach Classic						Ocean Center; Daytona Beach, FL
November 28, 2026*; 1:30 p.m., BallerTV		vs. Missouri; Daytona Beach Classic						Ocean Center; Daytona Beach, FL
December 4, 2026*; 7:00 p.m., ESPN+		at San Francisco						Sobrato Center; San Francisco, CA
December 6, 2026*; 3:00 p.m., ESPN+		at Pepperdine						Firestone Fieldhouse; Malibu, CA
December 11, 2026*; 6:30 p.m., YouTube		Sacramento State						ExtraMile Arena; Boise, ID
December 13, 2026*; 2:00 p.m., YouTube		Santa Clara						ExtraMile Arena; Boise, ID
December 20, 2026*; 2:00 p.m., YouTube		UC Riverside						ExtraMile Arena; Boise, ID
December 22, 2026*; 2:00 p.m., YouTube		Saint Mary's						ExtraMile Arena; Boise, ID
December 31, 2026*; 2:00 p.m., YouTube		South Dakota						ExtraMile Arena; Boise, ID
Pac-12 regular season
January 6, 2027; 6:00 p.m., YouTube		at Texas State						Strahan Arena; San Marcos, TX
January 10, 2027; 2:00 p.m., The CW		at San Diego State						Viejas Arena; San Diego, CA
January 14, 2027; 6:30 p.m., YouTube		Washington State						ExtraMile Arena; Boise, ID
January 16, 2027; 2:00 p.m., YouTube		Gonzaga						ExtraMile Arena; Boise, ID
January 20, 2027; TBA, YouTube		at Utah State						Smith Spectrum; Logan, UT
January 24, 2027; 2:00 p.m., YouTube		Colorado State						ExtraMile Arena; Boise, ID
January 27, 2027; 7:00 p.m., YouTube		at Oregon State						Gill Coliseum; Corvallis, OR
February 3, 2027; 7:30 p.m., YouTube		at Fresno State						Save Mart Center; Fresno, CA
February 6, 2027; 2:00 p.m., YouTube		Texas State						ExtraMile Arena; Boise, ID
February 11, 2027; 6:30 p.m., YouTube		Utah State						ExtraMile Arena; Boise, ID
February 14, 2027; 2:00 p.m., YouTube		San Diego State						ExtraMile Arena; Boise, ID
February 20, 2027; TBA, YouTube		at Gonzaga						McCarthey Athletic Center; Spokane, WA
February 24, 2027; 6:30 p.m., YouTube		Oregon State						ExtraMile Arena; Boise, ID
February 28, 2027; 12:00 p.m., The CW		at Washington State						Beasley Coliseum; Pullman, WA
March 3, 2027; TBA, YouTube		at Colorado State						Moby Arena; Fort Collins, CO
March 6, 2027; 2:00 p.m., YouTube		Fresno State						ExtraMile Arena; Boise, ID
Pac-12 tournament
March 9–13, 2027; TBA		vs.						MGM Grand Garden Arena; Paradise, NV
*Non-conference game. ^{#}Rankings from AP Poll. (#) Tournament seedings in parentheses. All times are in Mountain.
