= 2026–27 Gonzaga Bulldogs women's basketball team =

American college basketball season

2026–27 Gonzaga Bulldogs women's basketball
- Conference: Pac-12 Conference
- Record: 3–3 (0–0 Pac-12)
- Head coach: Lisa Fortier (13th season)
- Assistant coaches: Jordan Green; Stacy Clinesmith; Craig Fortier; Chantel Osahor; Jazmine Redmon
- Home arena: McCarthey Athletic Center

2026–27 Pac-12 Conference women's basketball standings
	Conf.				Overall
Team	W		L	PCT	W		L	PCT
Texas State	0	–	0	–	4	–	0	1.000
Boise State	0	–	0	–	4	–	1	.800
Fresno State	0	–	0	–	3	–	1	.750
Oregon State	0	–	0	–	3	–	2	.600
San Diego State	0	–	0	–	3	–	2	.600
Gonzaga	0	–	0	–	3	–	3	.500
Colorado State	0	–	0	–	2	–	2	.500
Washington State	0	–	0	–	2	–	3	.400
Utah State	0	–	0	–	2	–	4	.333
† 2027 Pac-12 Tournament winner As of November 20, 2026; Rankings from AP poll

The 2026–27 Gonzaga Bulldogs women's basketball team represents Gonzaga University during the 2026–27 NCAA Division I women's basketball season. The Bulldogs, led by 13th-year head coach Lisa Fortier, play their home games at the McCarthey Athletic Center in Spokane, Washington, as new members of the Pac-12 Conference.

== Previous season ==
The Bulldogs finished the 2025–26 season 24–10, 14–4 in WCC play, to finish in second place. They defeated Santa Clara and Oregon State to win the WCC tournament. As an result they received an automatic bid to the NCAA tournament as an No. 12 seed in the Sacramento Regional 2 where they lost in the first round to Ole Miss.

This season will mark Gonzaga's last season as members of the West Coast Conference, as they will be joining the newly reformed Pac-12 Conference, effective July 1, 2026.

== Offseason ==
=== Departures ===
Due to COVID-19 disruptions throughout NCAA sports in 2020–21, the NCAA announced that the 2020–21 season would not count against the athletic eligibility of any individual involved in an NCAA winter sport, including women's basketball. This meant that all seniors in 2023–24 had the option to return for 2024–25.

Gonzaga departures
Name	Num	Pos.	Height	Year	Hometown	Reason for departure
Paige Lofing	1	G	5'9"	Freshman	Billings, MT	Transferred to Montana
Vera Gunaydin	2	G	5'9"	Senior	Ankara, Turkey	Transferred to North Alabama
Sierra Lichtie	4	F	6'0"	Graduate Student	Riverton, UT	Graduated

=== Incoming transfers ===
Gonzaga incoming transfers
Name	Num	Pos.	Height	Year	Hometown	Previous school
Emmy Roach	4	G	6'0"	Junior	Littlehampton, Australia	Rider
Jocelyn Medina	8	G	5'6"	Senior	Arbuckle, CA	Denver

==== Recruiting ====
There was no recruiting class of 2026.

== Roster ==
2026–27 Gonzaga Bulldogs women's basketball team
Players
Coaches

Pos.	#	Name	Height	Year	Previous school	Hometown
G	0	Inês Bettencourt	5 ft 9 in (1.75 m)	GS	UConn	São Miguel, Portugal
G	3	Julia Wilson	5 ft 10 in (1.78 m)	So	Rancho Christian School	Temecula, California
G	4	Emmy Roach	6 ft 0 in (1.83 m)	So	Rider	Littlehampton, Australia
G	8	Jocelyn Medina	5 ft 6 in (1.68 m)	Sr	Denver	Arbuckle, California
G	11	Allie Turner	5 ft 8 in (1.73 m)	Jr	John Burroughs School	St. Louis, Missouri
G	12	Christabel Osarobo	5 ft 11 in (1.8 m)	Jr	Ipswich Basketball Academy	Tudela, Spain
F	13	Abby Lusk	6 ft 1 in (1.85 m)	Fr	Pocatello High School	Pocatello, Idaho
F	20	Taylor Smith	6 ft 2 in (1.88 m)	Sr	Weber State	Pocatello, Idaho
F	22	McKynnlie Dalan	6 ft 0 in (1.83 m)	Sr	Minnesota	Montesano, Washington
F	23	Jaiden Haile	6 ft 2 in (1.88 m)	So	West Fargo Horace High School	Fargo, North Dakota
G	24	Teryn Gardner	5 ft 10 in (1.78 m)	Jr	Boise State	Spokane, Washington
F	33	Lauren Whittaker	6 ft 3 in (1.91 m)	RS So	St Andrew's College	Canterbury, New Zealand
G	55	Zeryhia Aokuso	5 ft 10 in (1.78 m)	Sr	Saint Mary's	Amarillo, Texas

Head coach

- Lisa Fortier (Cal State Monterey Bay)

Assistant coach(es)

- Jordan Green (George Fox)
- Stacy Clinesmith (UC Santa Barbara)
- Craig Fortier (Cal State Monterey Bay)
- Chantel Osahor (Washington)
- Jazmine Redmon (Gonzaga)

Legend

- (C) Team captain
- (S) Suspended
- (I) Ineligible
- (W) Walk-on
- Injured
- Current redshirt

Roster
Last update: September 10, 2026

== Schedule and results ==
Date time, TV	Rank^{#}	Opponent^{#}	Result	Record	High points	High rebounds	High assists	Site (attendance) city, state
Exhibition
October 27, 2026*; 6:00 p.m.		Westmont	W 84–43		–	–	–	McCarthey Athletic Center; Spokane, WA
Non-conference regular season
November 2, 2026*; 6:00 p.m., SWX		North Dakota State	W 62–56	1–0	22 – Whittaker	10 – Whittaker	5 – Turner	McCarthey Athletic Center (4,464); Spokane, WA
November 6, 2026*; 6:00 p.m., YouTube		Idaho	L 75–86	1–1	23 – Turner	7 – Whittaker	4 – Tied	McCarthey Athletic Center (4,939); Spokane, WA
November 8, 2026*; 2:00 p.m., YouTube		UC Riverside	W 85–58	2–1	14 – Tied	14 – Whittaker	5 – Whittaker	McCarthey Athletic Center (4,521); Spokane, WA
November 13, 2026*; 5:00 p.m., MW+		at Grand Canyon	L 62–82	2–2	16 – Whittaker	8 – Whittaker	5 – Bettencourt	Global Credit Union Arena (1,722); Phoenix, AZ
November 15, 2026*; 2:00 p.m., ACCNX		at Stanford	L 65–67	2–3	17 – Turner	6 – Whittaker	6 – Smith	Maples Pavilion (2,405); Stanford, CA
November 18, 2026*; 6:00 p.m., SWX		Montana	W 84–61	3–3	25 – Whittaker	14 – Whittaker	4 – Tied	McCarthey Athletic Center (5,100); Spokane, WA
November 21, 2026*; 4:00 p.m., BallerTV		vs. Hawaii; North Shore Showcase						George Q. Cannon Activities Center; Laie, HI
November 23, 2026*; 2:00 p.m., BallerTV		vs. California; North Shore Showcase						George Q. Cannon Activities Center; Laie, HI
November 29, 2026*; 2:00 p.m., SWX		at Eastern Washington						Reese Court; Cheney, WA
December 4, 2026*; 6:00 p.m., YouTube		Yale						McCarthey Athletic Center; Spokane, WA
December 6, 2026*; 1:00 p.m., ESPN+		at Arizona State						Mullett Arena; Tempe, AZ
December 10, 2026*; 6:00 p.m., YouTube		Loyola Marymount						McCarthey Athletic Center; Spokane, WA
December 19, 2026*; 11:00 a.m., CBSSN		vs. Michigan State; Acrisure Series						Acrisure Arena; Thousand Palms, CA
December 30, 2026*; 6:00 p.m., YouTube		South Dakota State						McCarthey Athletic Center; Spokane, WA
January 2, 2027*; 2:00 p.m., YouTube		St. Thomas (MN)						McCarthey Athletic Center; Spokane, WA
Pac-12 regular season
January 6, 2027; 6:00 p.m., SWX		Oregon State						McCarthey Athletic Center; Spokane, WA
January 9, 2027; TBA, YouTube		at Fresno State						Save Mart Arena; Fresno, CA
January 13, 2027; 6:00 p.m., SWX		Texas State						McCarthey Athletic Center; Spokane, WA
January 16, 2027; TBA, YouTube		at Boise State						ExtraMile Arena; Boise, ID
January 21, 2027; TBA, YouTube		at San Diego State						Viejas Arena; San Diego, CA
January 28, 2027; 6:00 p.m., SWX		Utah State						McCarthey Athletic Center; Spokane, WA
January 31, 2027; 2:00 p.m., SWX		Fresno State						McCarthey Athletic Center; Spokane, WA
February 3, 2027; 7:00 p.m., USA		at Colorado State						Moby Arena; Fort Collins, CO
February 6, 2027; 8:00 p.m., The CW		San Diego State						McCarthey Athletic Center; Spokane, WA
February 11, 2027; 8:00 p.m., USA		at Oregon State						Gill Coliseum; Corvallis, OR
February 17, 2027; 7:00 p.m., USA		at Washington State						Beasley Coliseum; Pullman, WA
February 20, 2027; 2:00 p.m., SWX		Boise State						McCarthey Athletic Center; Spokane, WA
February 24, 2027; 7:00 p.m., USA		Colorado State						McCarthey Athletic Center; Spokane, WA
February 27, 2027; TBA, YouTube		at Utah State						Smith Spectrum; Logan, UT
March 3, 2027; TBA, YouTube		at Texas State						Strahan Arena; San Marcos, TX
March 6, 2027; 7:00 p.m., The CW		Washington State						McCarthey Athletic Center; Spokane, WA
Pac-12 tournament
March 9–13, 2027; TBA		vs.						MGM Grand Garden Arena; Paradise, NV
*Non-conference game. ^{#}Rankings from AP Poll. (#) Tournament seedings in parentheses. All times are in Pacific.

== See also ==
- 2026–27 Gonzaga Bulldogs men's basketball team
