= Utah Tech Trailblazers women's basketball =

American women's college basketball team

2026–27 Utah Tech Trailblazers women's basketball team
- University: Utah Tech University
- First season: 2006–07 (NCAA)
- Head coach: Adam Wardenburg (1st season)
- Location: St. George, Utah
- Arena: Burns Arena (capacity: 4,779)
- Conference: Big Sky
- Nickname: Trailblazers
- Colors: Red, navy blue, and white

NCAA Division I tournament appearances
- Division II: 2011

The Utah Tech Trailblazers women's basketball team represents Utah Tech University in St. George, Utah. Starting in 2020–21 season, the Trailblazers play in Division I and are members of the Big Sky Conference. Previously, the school's team participated in the Rocky Mountain Athletic Conference, at the Division II level of the NCAA. The team announced January 5, 2021, that they would suspend their 2020–21 season indefinitely, in wake of continued cancellations due to COVID-19.

The Trailblazers are currently led by head coach Adam Wardenburg, starting his first year.

The team plays its games at the Burns Arena on its campus in St. George.

In 2022, the university changed their name from Dixie State University to Utah Tech University. While the legal change doesn't occur until July 1, 2022, the school has already began using Utah Tech branding in all sites, materials, recruiting etc. The "Trailblazers" nickname will not be affected. The 2021–22 season was the last Trailblazers team to use the "Dixie State" name.

== Postseason ==
=== NCAA Division II tournament results ===
The Trailblazers, then known as the Red Storm, made one appearance in the NCAA Division II women's basketball tournament. They had a record of 0–1.

Year	Round	Opponent	Result
2011	First Round	Cal State Monterey Bay	L 59–68

== Season-by-season record ==
Season	Coach	Overall	Conference	Standing	Postseason
Angela Kristensen (Pacific West Conference) (2006–2013)
2006–07	Angela Kristensen	16–12			
2007–08	Angela Kristensen	16–11	12–6	3rd	
2008–09	Angela Kristensen	17–10	8–4	2nd	
2009–10	Angela Kristensen	17–8	13–3	T–2nd	
2010–11	Angela Kristensen	24–4	14–2	2nd	NCAA First Round
2011–12	Angela Kristensen	18–8	13–5	3rd	
2012–13	Angela Kristensen/Derek Dawes	15–13	12–6	6th	
Angela Kristensen:		123–66 (.651)	72–26 (.735)		
Catherria Turner (PacWest) (2013–2014)
2013–14	Catherria Turner	14–14	11–9	7th	
Catherria Turner:		14–14 (.500)	11–9 (.550)		
Jenny Thigpen (PacWest) (2014–2016)
2014–15	Jenny Thigpen	8–18	7–13	9th	
2015–16	Jenny Thigpen	9–17	9–11	8th	
Jenny Thigpen:		17–35 (.327)	16–24 (.400)		
JD Gustin (PacWest) (2016–2018)
2016–17	JD Gustin	5–21	5–15	11th	
2017–18	JD Gustin	12–15	8–12	9th	
JD Gustin (Rocky Mountain Athletic Conference) (2018–2020)
2018–19	JD Gustin	15–11	11–11	10th	
2019–20	JD Gustin	18–12	12–10	7th	
JD Gustin (Western Athletic Conference) (2020–present)
2020–21	JD Gustin				
JD Gustin:		50–59	37–50		
Total:		198–174 (.532)			
National champion Postseason invitational champion Conference regular season champion Conference regular season and conference tournament champion Division regular season champion Division regular season and conference tournament champion Conference tournament champion
