= Lette =

Lette can refer to:

Geography

- Lette (Coesfeld), a part of Coesfeld, North Rhine-Westphalia, Germany
- Lette (Oelde), a part of Oelde, North Rhine-Westphalia, Germany
- Lette, New South Wales, a locality in New South Wales, Australia

People

- Henry Lette (1829–1892), Australian cricketer
- Kathy Lette (born 1958), Australian author
