= Fresno State Bulldogs women's basketball =

| 2026–27 Fresno State Bulldogs women's basketball team |
- University: California State University, Fresno
- Head coach: Ryan McCarthy (2nd season)
- Location: Fresno, California
- Arena: Save Mart Center (capacity: 14,544)
- Conference: Pac-12
- Nickname: Bulldogs
- Colors: Cardinal red and blue

NCAA Division I tournament appearances
- 2008, 2009, 2010, 2011, 2012, 2013, 2014

Conference tournament champions
- 2008, 2009, 2011, 2012

Conference regular-season champions
- 2008, 2009, 2010, 2012, 2020

Uniforms
| Home | Away | Alternate |

The Fresno State Bulldogs women's basketball team represents California State University, Fresno, located in Fresno, California, in NCAA Division I basketball competition. They play their home games at the Save Mart Center and are members of the Pac-12 Conference (Pac-12).

== History ==
The Bulldogs have an all-time record of 867–704 as of the end of the 2025–26 season. Fresno State has made the NCAA tournament seven times (2008, 2009, 2010, 2011, 2012, 2013, 2014) but have never gone past the first round. Before they left the Western Athletic Conference in 2012, the Bulldogs won four WAC titles.

| Season | Record | Conference Record | Coach |
|---|---|---|---|
| 1971–72 | 10–4 | 8–2 | Donna Pickel |
| 1972–73 | 9–5 | 8–2 | Donna Pickel |
| 1973–74 | 10–11 | 5–5 | Donna Pickel |
| 1974–75 | 8–7 | 5–5 | Donna Pickel |
| 1975–76 | 6–11 | n/a | Donna Pickel |
| 1976–77 | 5–10 | n/a | Donna Pickel |
| 1977–78 | 10–14 | 4–8 | Val Cal (interim) |
| 1978–79 | 11–14 | 3–9 | Donna Pickel |
| 1979–80 | 12–14 | 1–11 | Diane Milutinovich |
| 1980–81 | 4–21 | 1–11 | Diane Milutinovich |
| 1981–82 | 8–7 | 4–8 | Bob Spencer |
| 1982–83 | 15–12 | 6–8 | Bob Spencer |
| 1983–84 | 18–11 | 8–6 | Bob Spencer |
| 1984–85 | 20–9 | 8–4 | Bob Spencer |
| 1985–86 | 21–9 | 8–4 | Bob Spencer |
| 1986–87 | 22–8 | 12–6 | Bob Spencer |
| 1987–88 | 16–12 | 11–7 | Bob Spencer |
| 1988–89 | 18–12 | 9–9 | Bob Spencer |
| 1989–90 | 21–12 | 11–7 | Bob Spencer |
| 1990–91 | 16–13 | 9–9 | Bob Spencer |
| 1991–92 | 13–15 | 7–11 | Bob Spencer |
| 1992–93 | 10–17 | 4–10 | Bob Spencer |
| 1993–94 | 13–15 | 5–9 | Linda Wunder |
| 1994–95 | 14–14 | 5–9 | Linda Wunder |
| 1995–96 | 11–16 | 4–10 | Linda Wunder |
| 1996–97 | 14–13 | 7–9 | Linda Wunder |
| 1997–98 | 12–16 | 6–8 | Linda Wunder |
| 1998–99 | 9–19 | 4–10 | Britt King |
| 1999-00 | 11–18 | 4–10 | Britt King |
| 2000–01 | 10–19 | 6–10 | Britt King |
| 2001–02 | 9–20 | 4–14 | Britt King |
| 2002–03 | 21–13 | 11–7 | Stacy Johnson-Klein |
| 2003–04 | 13–16 | 7–11 | Stacy Johnson-Klein |
| 2004–05 | 20–11 | 10–8 | Stacy Johnson-Klein/Adrian Wiggins |
| 2005–06 | 24–8 | 14–2 | Adrian Wiggins |
| 2006–07 | 18–13 | 9–7 | Adrian Wiggins |
| 2007–08 | 22–11 | 14–2 | Adrian Wiggins |
| 2008–09 | 24–9 | 12–4 | Adrian Wiggins |
| 2009–10 | 27–7 | 16–0 | Adrian Wiggins |
| 2010–11 | 25–8 | 14–2 | Adrian Wiggins |
| 2011–12 | 28–6 | 13–1 | Adrian Wiggins |
| 2012–13 | 24–9 | 13–3 | Raegan Pebley |
| 2013–14 | 22–11 | 13–5 | Raegan Pebley |
| 2014–15 | 23–10 | 13–5 | Jaime White |
| 2015–16 | 22–12 | 15–3 | Jaime White |
| 2016–17 | 18–15 | 8–10 | Jaime White |
| 2017–18 | 17–15 | 11–7 | Jaime White |
| 2018–19 | 19–13 | 11–7 | Jaime White |
| 2019–20 | 25–7 | 12–2 | Jaime White |
| 2020–21 | 17–11 | 12–6 | Jaime White |
| 2021–22 | 11–18 | 7–10 | Jaime White |
| 2022–23 | 10–22 | 3–15 | Jaime White |
| 2023–24 | 15–18 | 7–11 | Jaime White |
| 2024–25 | 19–15 | 8–10 | Jaime White |
| 2025–26 | 15–18 | 8–12 | Ryan McCarthy |

== Postseason results ==
=== NCAA Division I tournament ===
The Bulldogs have made seven appearances in the NCAA Division I women's basketball tournament. They have a combined record of 0–7.

| Year | Seed | Round | Opponent | Result |
|---|---|---|---|---|
| 2008 | #14 | First Round | #3 Baylor | L 67−88 |
| 2009 | #13 | First Round | #4 California | L 47−70 |
| 2010 | #13 | First Round | #4 Baylor | L 55−69 |
| 2011 | #12 | First Round | #5 North Carolina | L 68−82 |
| 2012 | #12 | First Round | #5 Georgetown | L 56−61 |
| 2013 | #15 | First Round | #2 California | L 76−90 |
| 2014 | #13 | First Round | #4 Nebraska | L 55−74 |

=== AIAW Division I tournament ===
The Bulldogs made one appearance in the AIAW National Division I basketball tournament, with a combined record of 0–2.

| Year | Round | Opponent | Result |
|---|---|---|---|
| 1974 | First Round; Consolation First Round | Queens (NY); Tennessee Tech | L 36–50; L 41–53 |
