= Ciba =

Ciba or CIBA may refer to:

== CIBA ==
- Chemical Industry Basel (CIBA), former name of a company (Ciba-Geigy) that merged with "Sandoz" to form Novartis
  - Ciba Specialty Chemicals
  - Ciba Vision
- CIBA, acronym for the California Intercollegiate Baseball Association
- CIBA, acronym for the Connecticut International Baccalaureate Academy
- Confédération International de Billard Artistique of Artistic billiards
- Central Institute of Brackishwater Aquaculture

== Other uses ==
- Ciba cake, cooked glutinous rice pounded into paste – a traditional Chinese food
- Ciba, a village in Crăciunești Commune, Mureș County, Romania
- Ciba, a village in Miercurea-Ciuc city, Harghita County, Romania
- Cíbà, Chinese name for dictionary software called PowerWord
- Ciba, a genus of Caribbean spiders

== See also ==
- Csiba (disambiguation)
