= Don Flanagan =

American retired basketball coach

Biographical details
- Born: November 29, 1943 (age 82); Cambridge, Massachusetts, U.S.

Playing career
- 1967–1971: Fort Lewis
- Position: Guard

Coaching career (HC unless noted)
- 1971–1973: Coronado HS (boys')
- 1973–1975: Pawcatuck MS (boys')
- 1975–1979: Window Rock HS (boys')
- 1979–1995: Eldorado HS
- 1995–2011: New Mexico

Head coaching record
- Overall: 340–168 (.669) (college)
- Tournaments: 3–8 (NCAA); 5–5 (WNIT)

Accomplishments and honors

Championships
- 5× MW Tournament (2003–2005, 2007, 2008); 2× MW regular season (2004, 2005); WAC tournament (1998); WAC Pacific Division (1999); 11× NMAA Class 4A (1980, 1981, 1983, 1984, 1986, 1987, 1989, 1990, 1992, 1993, 1995)

Awards
- MW Coach of the Year (2005); WBCA Region 7 Coach of the Year (2006)

Donald Elliott Flanagan (born November 29, 1943) is an American retired basketball coach. From 1995 to 2011, Flanagan was head coach of the University of New Mexico women's basketball team.

== Early life and college education ==
Born in Cambridge, Massachusetts and raised in the Mayberry Village community of New Hartford, Connecticut, Flanagan graduated from Cornwall Academy after attending East Hartford High School for three years and earned a basketball scholarship to Hartwick College, but he dropped out after one year.

Flanagan worked in Hartford before moving to Durango, Colorado to enroll at Fort Lewis College in 1967. Flanagan graduated from Fort Lewis in 1971 with a double major in elementary education and physical education. Flanagan played at guard for the Fort Lewis Skyhawks, then an NAIA program; he averaged 13.8 points and 5.3 rebounds in his junior season of 1969–70.

== Coaching career ==
Flanagan began his coaching career in 1971 as boys' varsity basketball coach at Coronado High School in Gallina, New Mexico; he also coached cross country and baseball there. In 1973, Flanagan returned to Connecticut to coach at Pawcatuck Middle School in Pawcatuck, Connecticut. At Pawcatabuck, Flanagan had a 15–0 season. Flanagan returned to the Southwest in 1975 as boys' varsity basketball coach at Window Rock High School in Fort Defiance, Arizona. Window Rock went 75–25 and made the state tournament every year under Flanagan, including as state runner-up in 1978.

From 1979 to 1995, Flanagan was the girls' basketball head coach at Eldorado High School in Albuquerque, New Mexico, where he had a record of 401–13 and 11 New Mexico Activities Association Class 4A championships for the years 1980, 1981, 1983, 1984, 1986, 1987, 1989, 1990, 1992, 1993, and 1995. Flanagan was inducted into the Albuquerque Sports Hall of Fame in 1997.

As women's basketball coach at the University of New Mexico, Flanagan coached 508 collegiate games, which as of March 7, 2014, is a feat no coach has done in New Mexico basketball history. As of March 2014, he holds the title of most wins by any coach, men's or women's, at the school with 340 victories. He passed former UNM Men's Basketball coach Dave Bliss's 246 wins on December 9, 2006. From 1998 to 2010, Flanagan's teams made the NCAA tournament or Women's National Invitation Tournament (WNIT) every year. Flanagan's New Mexico teams made seven NCAA Tournaments and six WNITs.

On April 4, 2011, Flanagan announced his resignation, following a 13–18 season and with a year remaining on his contract. He finished his coaching career with the Lobos with a record of 340 wins to 168 losses. Prior to his resignation, five freshmen players left the team. Flanagan responded: "It wasn't fair to the program for me to stay and try to recruit multiple players with one year left on my contract." With that resignation, Flanagan retired from coaching. Assistant coach Yvonne Sanchez, who had been an assistant coach under Flanagan since 2000, succeeded Flanagan as head coach on April 22, 2011.

== Head coaching record ==
Record table
Season	Team	Overall	Conference	Standing	Postseason
New Mexico Lobos (Western Athletic Conference) (1995–1999)
1995–96	New Mexico	14–15	6–8	5th	
1996–97	New Mexico	18–10	8–8	4th (Mountain)	
1997–98	New Mexico	26–7	10–4	T–3rd (Mountain)	NCAA first round
1998–99	New Mexico	24–7	12–2	T–1st (Pacific)	WNIT Third Round
New Mexico (WAC):		82–39 (.678)	36–22 (.621)		
New Mexico Lobos (Mountain West Conference) (1999–2011)
1999–2000	New Mexico	18–11	9–5	T–3rd	WNIT First Round
2000–01	New Mexico	22–13	8–6	T–3rd	WNIT Runner Up
2001–02	New Mexico	22–9	10–4	T–2nd	NCAA first round
2002–03	New Mexico	24–9	9–5	2nd	NCAA Sweet 16
2003–04	New Mexico	23–8	12–2	T–1st	NCAA first round
2004–05	New Mexico	26–5	12–2	T–1st	NCAA first round
2005–06	New Mexico	22–10	11–5	T–3rd	NCAA second round
2006–07	New Mexico	24–9	11–5	T–2nd	NCAA first round
2007–08	New Mexico	20–13	9–7	4th	NCAA first round
2008–09	New Mexico	25–11	9–7	4th	WNIT Quarterfinals
2009–10	New Mexico	19–13	9–7	T–5th	WNIT First Round
2010–11	New Mexico	13–18	5–11	7th	
New Mexico (MW):		258–129 (.667)	114–66 (.633)		
Total:		340–168 (.669)			
National champion Postseason invitational champion Conference regular season champion Conference regular season and conference tournament champion Division regular season champion Division regular season and conference tournament champion Conference tournament champion

Sources:

- WAC standings:
- MW standings:
- Postseason results:
