= New Mexico Lobos women's basketball =

New Mexico Lobos
2026–27 New Mexico Lobos women's basketball team
- University: University of New Mexico
- Head coach: Amy Eagan (1st season)
- Location: Albuquerque, New Mexico
- Arena: The Pit (capacity: 15,411)
- Conference: Mountain West
- Nickname: Lobos
- Colors: Cherry and silver

NCAA Division I tournament Sweet Sixteen
- 2003

NCAA Division I tournament appearances
- 1998, 2002, 2003, 2004, 2005, 2006, 2007, 2008

Conference tournament champions
- 1998, 2003, 2004, 2005, 2007, 2008

Conference regular-season champions
- 2004, 2005, 2021

Uniforms
Home	Away

The New Mexico Lobos women's basketball team represents the University of New Mexico in the Mountain West Conference in the NCAA Division I. The team is coached by first-year head coach Amy Eagan.

== Coaching history ==
=== Pre Varsity Eras ===
The UNM women's basketball team played their first recorded game on December 22, 1898 . It was an intramural game played between teams called the Gladiators and the Olympians; it was an intramural game as both teams were made up of University of New Mexico students. Shortly after this first game was played, the women played the first game in the women's basketball version of what is now known as the Rio Grande Rivalry, as they played Las Cruces College to a 4-2 win at the First Street Armory. After that first season of play, the women's team would late extend invitations to colleges throughout New Mexico; however, in 1912, the UNM faculty refused to allow the women to travel outside of the city.

In the 1970s, with the introduction of Title IX, UNM effectively restarted their women's basketball program, with 2 club seasons in 1972-73 and 1973-74. After the 1973-74 season, the University fully established the basketball team as an official interscholastic athletic team.

=== Kathy Marpe (1974–80) ===
Head coach Kathy Marpe compiled a winning record with UNM women's basketball team to a win 78 games and lose 58 (.577).

=== Doug Hoselton (1980–87) ===
Coach Doug Hoselton compiled a record of 89 wins and 105 (.459). After the 1987 season, facing budget issues, the university shut down the women's basketball program.

=== Maureen Eckroth (1991–95) ===
Maureen Eckroth had an unfortunate record during the four years as head coach, finishing with 14 wins and 96 losses(.13).

=== Don Flanagan (1995–2011) ===
Don Flanagan coached the Lobos for 16 seasons, improving the Lobos' record to a remarkable 340–168 (.669). He announced his retirement in April, 2011.

=== Yvonne Sanchez (2011–2016) ===
Yvonne Sanchez was named head coach on April 22, 2011 replacing Don Flanagan who had been the head coach for 15 years.

=== Mike Bradbury (March 2016–2026) ===
In March 2016, Mike Bradbury took over as the new women's head basketball coach, after former coach Yvonne Sanchez was fired earlier that month.

=== Amy Eagan (March 2026–Present) ===
In March 2026, Lindenwood head coach Amy Eagan took over as the new women's head basketball coach, after former coach Mike Bradbury and UNM parted ways earlier that month.

== NCAA tournament results ==
The Lobos have a record of 3−8 in the NCAA tournament on eight appearances.

Year	Seed	Round	Opponent	Result
1998	#8	First Round	#9 Nebraska	L 59−76
2002	#10	First Round	#7 Notre Dame	L 61−71
2003	#6	First Round; Second Round; Sweet Sixteen	#11 Miami (FL) #3 Mississippi State #2 Texas Tech	W 91−85; W 73−61; L 76−81
2004	#12	First Round	#5 Florida	L 56−68
2005	#8	First Round	#9 Purdue	L 56−68
2006	#11	First Round; Second Round	#6 Florida #3 Baylor	W 83−59; L 67−87
2007	#8	First Round	#9 Green Bay	L 52−59
2008	#12	First Round	#5 West Virginia	L 60−61
