= Stone Academy =

Stone Academy may refer to:

- Stone Academy (Connecticut), a vocational school with several branches
- Stone Academy (Chicago), Illinois
- Stone Academy (Solon, Iowa), a historic schoolhouse listed on the National Register of Historic Places
