= Wickham Park =

Wickham Park may refer to:

- Wickham Park in Brisbane, Australia
- Wickham Park (Manchester, Connecticut) in the United States
- Wickham Park (Melbourne, Florida) in the United States
