= Connecticut River Academy =

Connecticut River Academy @ Goodwin University
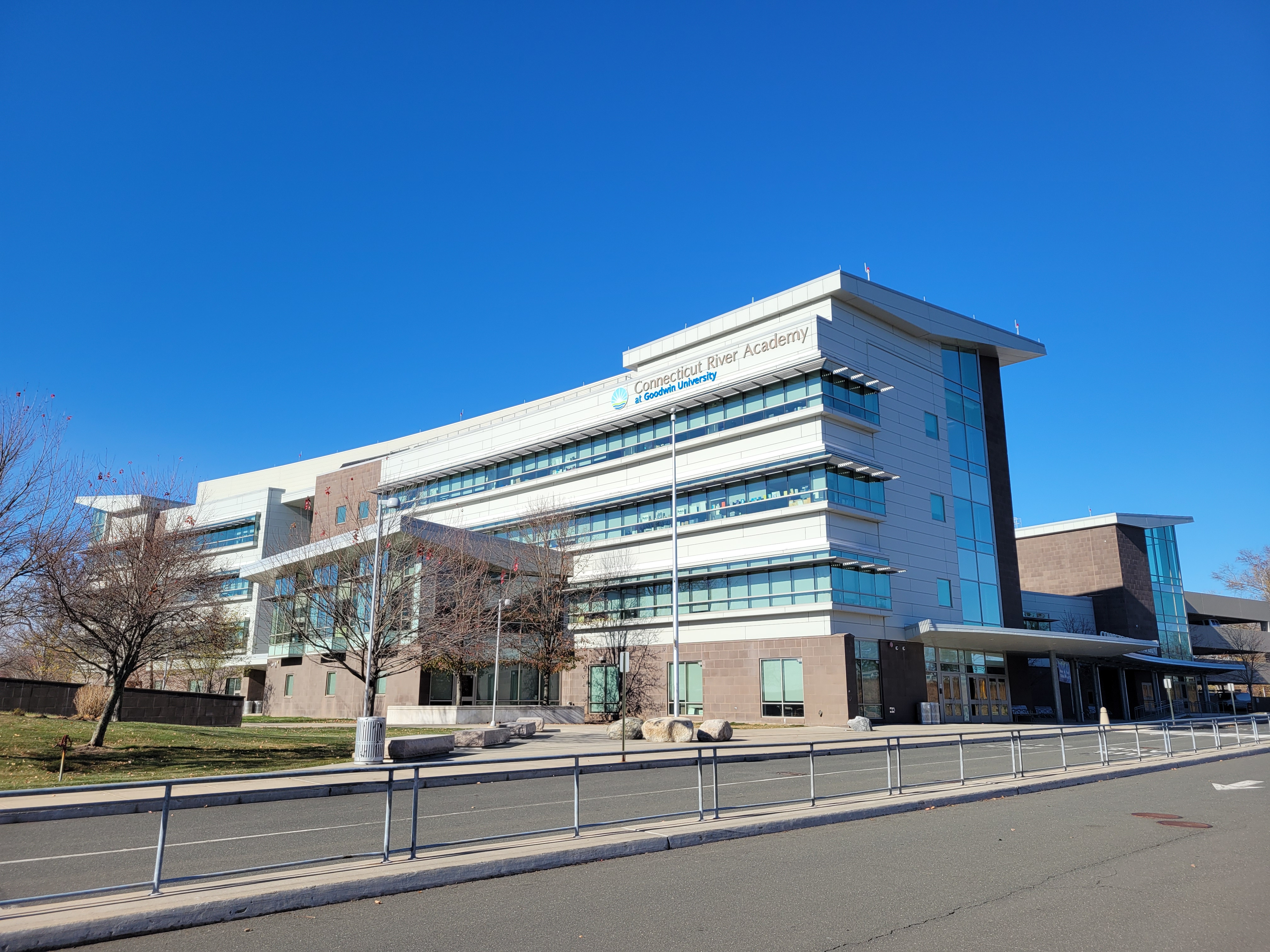

Location
- 9 Riverside Drive; East Hartford, Connecticut; United States
- Coordinates: 41°44′57″N 72°38′35″W

Information
- Other name: CTRA, CT River Academy
- Type: Magnet School
- Established: 2010 (16 years ago)
- CEEB code: 070167
- NCES School ID: 090345001581
- Principal: JT Foster (Interim)
- Grades: 6–12
- Enrollment: 455 (2017)
- Colors: Blue, gray, green
- Mascot: Eagle
- Website: www.ctriveracademy.org

The Connecticut River Academy (CTRA) is a magnet high school for grades 9 – 12, located in East Hartford, Hartford County, Connecticut, United States. It is co-located with Goodwin University, a small 4-year college which moved to the site in 2005. Connecticut River Academy opened in 2010 and graduated its first 4-year class in 2014. CTRA's Sustainability Theme provides hands-on learning in Environmental Studies and Advanced Manufacturing. CTRA's Early College Model offers college and career experiences, including the opportunity to earn tuition-free college credits. The academy is accredited by New England Association of Schools and Colleges (NEASC).
