= Goodwin University =

Private non-profit university in East Hartford, Connecticut, United States

Coordinates: 41.7429°N 72.6394°W

- Former names: Data Institute Business School 1962–1999; Goodwin College 1999–2020
- Type: Private university
- Established: 1962
- Endowment: $9,104,000 (2015–16)
- President: Mark E. Scheinberg
- Faculty: 93
- Students: 3,477 (Fall 2019)
- Location: East Hartford, Connecticut, United States
- Campus: 4 acres (1.6 ha)
- Mascot: The Navigator
- Website: www.goodwin.edu

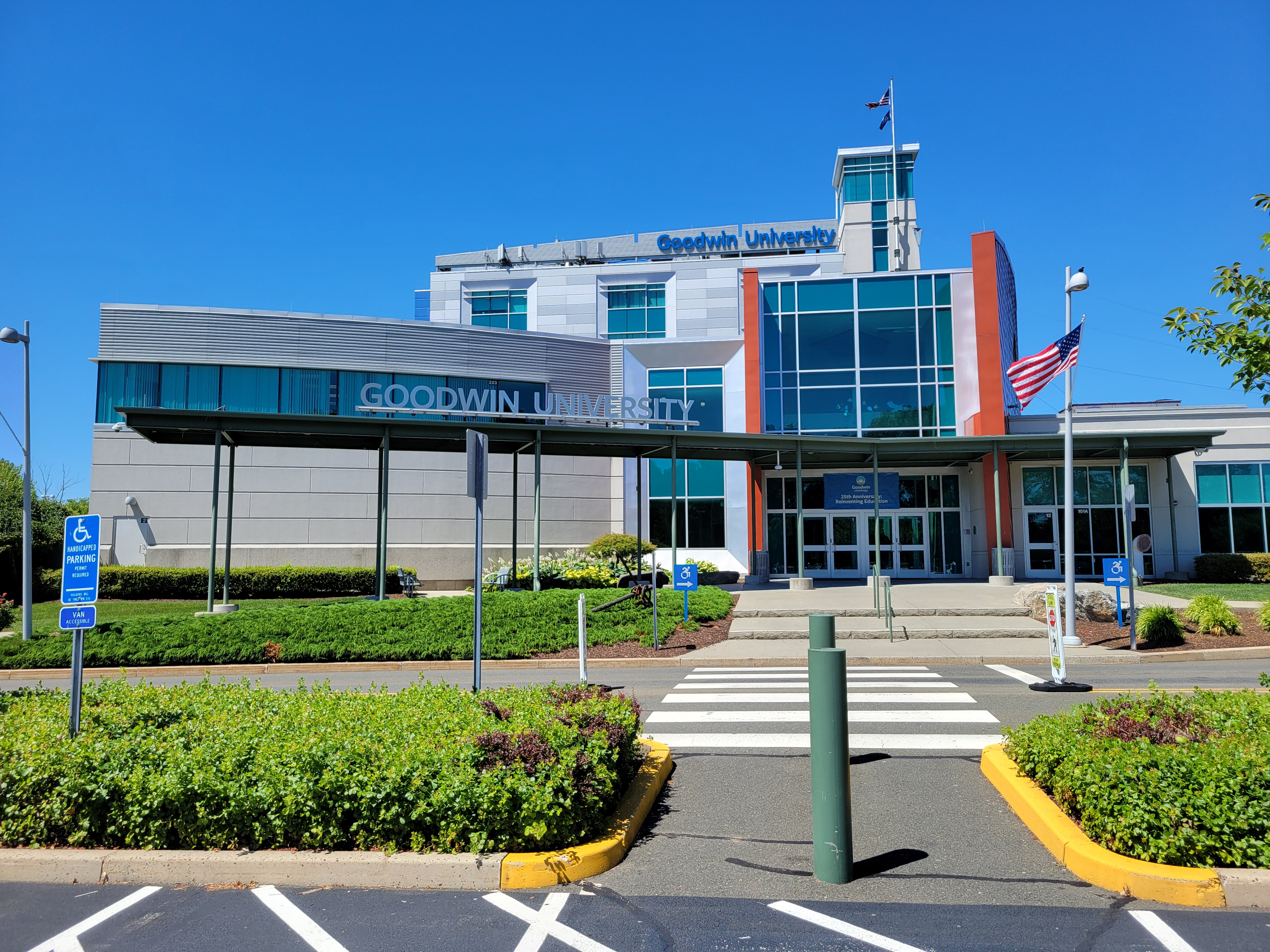
Main Building, One Riverside Drive

Goodwin University is a private university in East Hartford, Connecticut, United States. It was founded in 1962 as the Data Institute Business School. It purchased the University of Bridgeport in January 2021.

== History ==
Goodwin University began as Data Institute Business School in 1962. In 2004, the college gained non-profit status and was granted accreditation by the New England Association of Schools and Colleges (NEASC). In 2008, the Connecticut Board of Governors for Higher Education authorized the institution to offer baccalaureate programs.

In 2005, Goodwin University initiated a major project to construct a new campus along the Connecticut River in East Hartford. The college had purchased riverfront property that was home to a defunct oil terminal, and took steps to redevelop the site in partnership with state and federal environmental agencies and the Connecticut Development Authority (CDA).

Goodwin College became Goodwin University in early 2020. In January 2021, it was announced that Goodwin University would be taking over the University of Bridgeport in Bridgeport, Connecticut, and operating it as a subsidiary, although UB would retain its own name and brand.

== Campus ==
The campus is located in East Hartford, Connecticut. It is located on riverfront property that was the former location of a terminal. The site had been designated as a brown field, or contaminated area, by the Environmental Protection Agency, and the college removed thirty large oil storage tanks and conducted soil remediation with the help of state and federal funding.

The campus includes a sculpture by David Hayes.

== Academics ==
The university has three main schools: the School of Nursing and Health Professions, the School of Business Technology and Advanced Manufacturing, and the School of Applied Liberal Arts and Social Sciences.

=== Accreditation ===
Goodwin University is accredited by the New England Commission of Higher Education (NECHE). Programs accredited by specific accreditors include:

- The Dental Hygiene program is accredited by the Commission on Dental Accreditation.
- The Early Childhood Education program is accredited by the National Association for the Education of Young Children (NAEYC).
- The Funeral Service Associate Degree Program is accredited by the American Board of Funeral Service Education (ABFSE).
- The certificate program in medical assisting is accredited by the Commission on Accreditation of Allied Health Education Programs (CAAHEP).
- The Associate in Science degree in nursing is accredited by the Accreditation Commission for Education in Nursing (ACEN).
- The baccalaureate degree program in nursing (RN-to-BSN and ABSN) is accredited by the Commission on Collegiate Nursing Education (CCNE).
- The Occupational Therapy Assistant Program is accredited by the Accreditation Council for Occupational Therapy Education (ACOTE).
- The Respiratory Care Associate in Science program ais accredited by the Commission on Accreditation for Respiratory Care (CoARC)
- The Vision Care Technology program is accredited by the Commission on Opticianry Accreditation

=== Magnet schools ===
The Goodwin University campus is home to three magnet schools: Connecticut River Academy, an early college and sustainability themed magnet high school; Riverside Magnet School, a Reggio Emilia approach themed magnet elementary school; and Pathways Academy of Design and Technology, a design and technology themed magnet high school.

== Notable alumni ==
- Susan Saint James, actress
- Ernestina Naadu Mills, First Lady of Ghana

== See also ==
- List of colleges and universities in Connecticut
