= Mayberry Village =

Area in east central East Hartford, Connecticut

Coordinates: 41.7787°N 72.5865°W

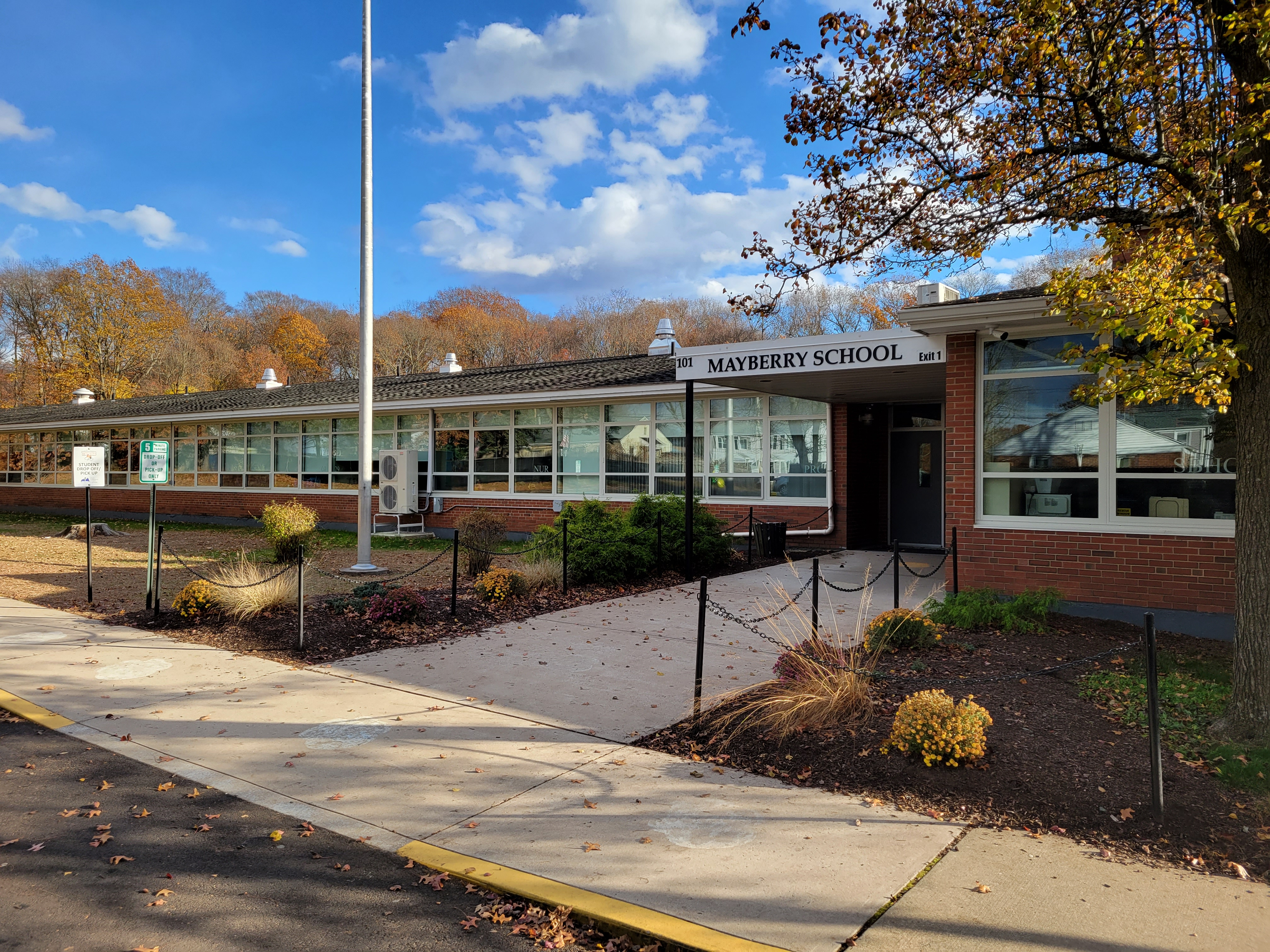
Mayberry School

Mayberry Village is an area in east central East Hartford, Connecticut, United States. The neighborhood was originally developed in the 1940s to house the influx of people who worked at Pratt and Whitney and other defense industries in Connecticut. It is roughly bounded by Burnside Avenue to the north and Wilbur Cross Highway the south. To the east is the Hockanum River, across from which is Wickham Park, mostly in Manchester.

== History ==
Mayberry Village was built in 1941 on what was the Cannon family farm, to house the influx of people who worked at Pratt and Whitney and other defense industries in Connecticut. The upper section of mostly multiple-unit construction was built first was the original neighborhood, bordered by Home Terrace, Highview, Edgewood and Arbutus streets, was called Laurel Park Heights, named after the trolley park that was located where Sunset Hills was developed in the late 1950s. Old trolley tracks can still be seen in the Hockanum River Gorge. The "New Village", single and duplex units, was built later. The complex was named after Doctor Mayberry, a local physician who was killed while crossing railroad tracks under Burnham Street. In 1956, the units were offered for sale to those people living within them. Many of these families did buy their houses and rented the other apartments to the people who continued to live there.

One of the small houses in the New Village served as a local library until it burned in a fire. The Community Building, now the Larson Center after longtime congressman John B. Larson, housed the rental office and two second grade classrooms upstairs.

The neighborhood was served by the Little Red School House, which eventually burned down.
