= The Pit (arena) =

Basketball arena in Albuquerque, New Mexico, United States

- The Pit - Powered by Nusenda
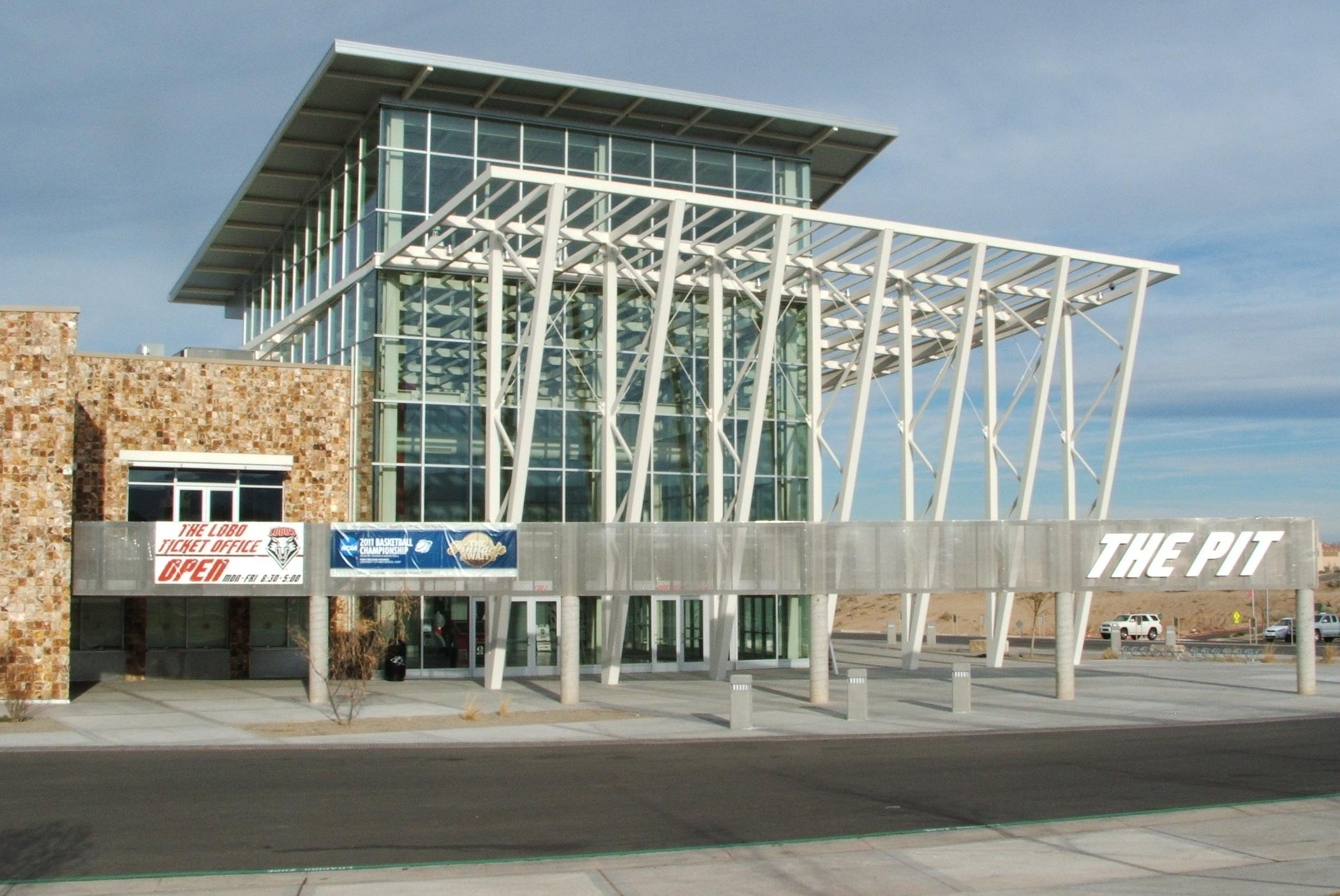
- Northeast entrance in 2011
- Interactive map of The Pit
- Former names: University Arena (1966–2014); WisePies Arena aka The Pit (2014–17); Dreamstyle Arena (2017–2020)
- Location: Stadium Blvd & University Blvd SE, Albuquerque, New Mexico
- Coordinates: 35.067°N 106.632°W
- Owner: University of New Mexico
- Operator: University of New Mexico, Associated Students of UNM
- Capacity: Basketball: 14,831 (1966–1975); 18,018 (1975–2008); 14,586 (2009 renovations); 15,411 (2010–present); Concerts: up to 13,480 (2009–present)

Construction
- Groundbreaking: December 1965
- Opened: December 1, 1966; 59 years ago
- Renovated: 2009
- Expanded: 1975
- Cost: $1.4 million ($13.9 million in 2025) $60 million (renovations)
- Architects: (original) Joe Boehning (2009 renovation) Molzen Corbin, Architect of Record; Sink Combs Dethlefs, Arena Design Consultant

Tenants
- New Mexico Lobos (NCAA) (1966–present); New Mexico Activities Association State Basketball Tournaments (1990–present); 1983 NCAA Men's Division I Basketball Championship

The Pit (also known as The Pit - Powered by Nusenda) is an indoor arena in Albuquerque, New Mexico, serving primarily as the home venue of the University of New Mexico Lobos basketball teams. The facility opened in 1966 as University Arena but gained the nickname "The Pit" due to its innovative subterranean design, with its playing floor 37 feet (11 m) below street level. The arena is located on the UNM South Campus and has a seating capacity of 15,411 for basketball and up to 13,480 for concerts, with 40 luxury suites and 365 club seats.

The Pit has frequently hosted NCAA basketball tournament games, including the 1983 Final Four, which featured North Carolina State's upset win over Houston.

== History ==
Before construction of The Pit, Lobo basketball teams played at Johnson Gymnasium, a 7,800-seat multi-purpose gym on the University of New Mexico main campus. Lobo basketball was unsuccessful at the time that Johnson Gym opened, and it was rarely more than half-full for games. In 1962, UNM hired Bob King as head basketball coach, and he immediately transformed the Lobos into a winning program, reaching the finals of the National Invitation Tournament in his second season. Attendance at Lobo home games doubled, tickets were soon selling out, and plans for a larger arena began to take shape.

University administrators wanted a much larger facility while providing fans an unobstructed view from any seat. A suitably large building would normally require support columns, however, leading chief architect Joe Boehning to incorporate a roof designed by the Behlen company, a "stress skin system" made of light gauge metal supported by a series of trusses. The 338-by-300-foot (103 m × 91 m) roof was constructed first, just above street level, and the ground beneath was then excavated to form the bowl of the arena. The playing surface lies 37 feet (11 m) below grade, giving rise to the now-famous name. There are no supporting pillars in the seating area of the arena, so there are no obstructed views. Its compact area, steep grade, and the proximity of the seats to the floor contribute to its legendary noise level. The subterranean design won international recognition for Boehning. The arena originally had a seating capacity of 14,831 and cost a mere $1.4 million to build, about a fifth the cost of comparable facilities built at the time. The design allowed the foundation to rest directly on earth, eliminating the need for a steel structure to support the concrete, resulting in tremendous cost savings.

The Pit opened on December 1, 1966, with New Mexico defeating Abilene Christian College, 62–53. The building was officially named University Arena, but students were already calling it "The Pit" by the time it opened, and the nickname stuck. The Lobos have enjoyed extraordinary success playing at The Pit, winning over 80 percent of their games there and mounting home winning streaks of over 20 games four times, with the longest streak of 41 straight wins in 1996–98. The Lobos have made 14 NCAA tournament appearances and 17 NIT appearances since the opening of the arena. The Pit has hosted NCAA tournament regionals numerous times and hosted the 1983 Final Four championship. It also serves as the primary venue for New Mexico state high school basketball championship tournaments.

In 1992, the University of New Mexico recognized the coach who made construction of The Pit possible, naming the playing surface Bob King Court in his honor. The court was officially dedicated to King in a formal ceremony on December 1, 1992, the 26th anniversary of the opening of The Pit, a tribute to the contributions King made to Lobo basketball.

=== Atmosphere and reputation ===
The Lobos have been among the nation's attendance leaders since The Pit opened. They have averaged over 15,400 fans per game at The Pit since 1966. They finished in the top five nationally in attendance 16 times in their first 20 years at The Pit, finishing second five times, and they were in the top ten all but one season through 2002. Attendance has averaged an astonishing 95 percent of seating capacity, partially due to standing room only tickets pushing attendance beyond stated capacity at times. The top average attendance for a season prior to the 2008 renovations was 17,625 in 1997–98, and the largest crowd to attend a single game was 19,452 on January 17, 1976, against UNLV. Recent renovations have decreased the seating capacity of The Pit, but the Lobos have continued to rank in the top 25 every season.

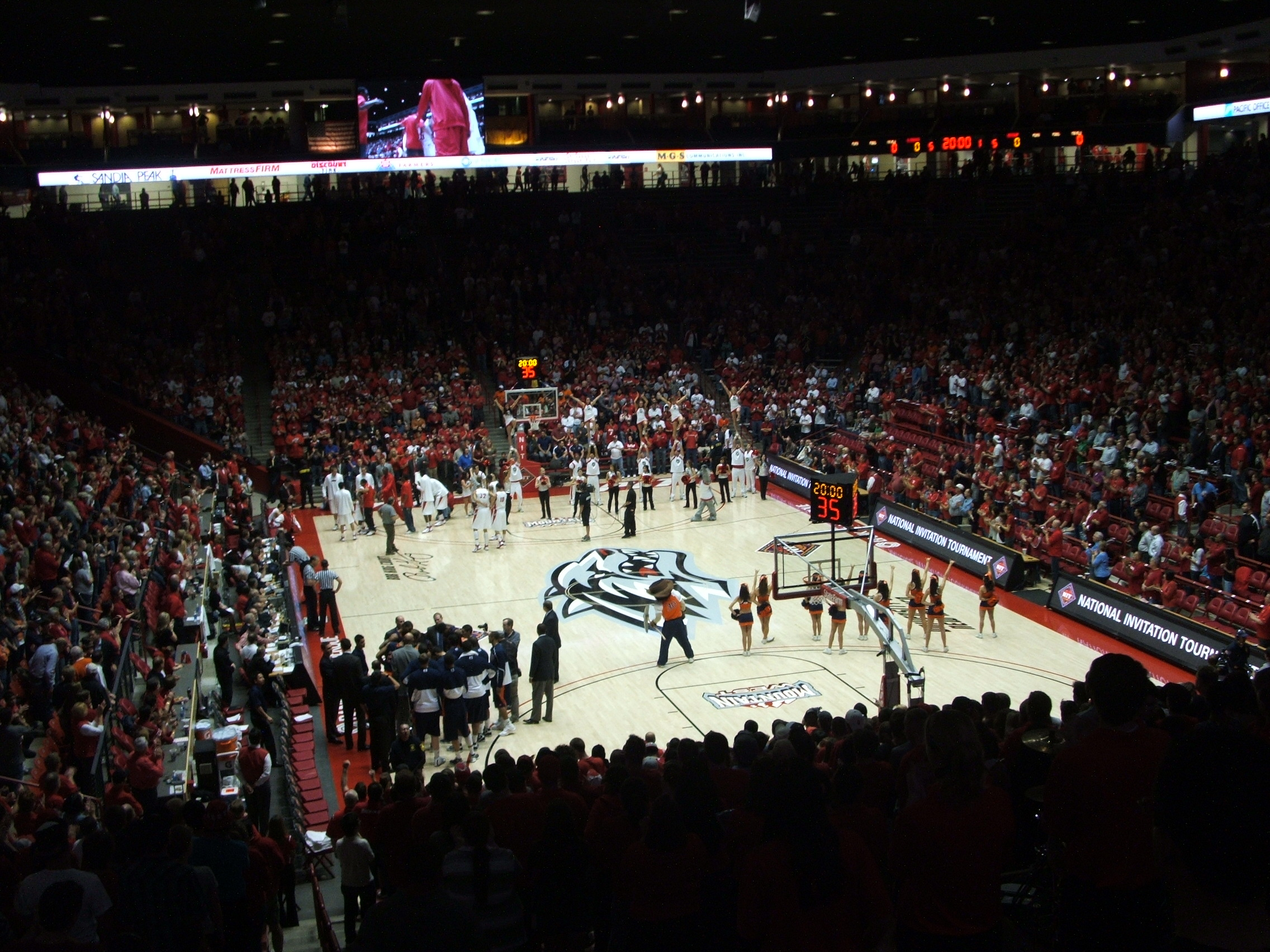
Bob King Court at The Pit

The Pit is known as one of the loudest venues in college basketball. During the 1998–99 season, the St. Petersburg Times conducted a study of decibel levels at collegiate basketball arenas. The Lobo game in The Pit against Arizona registered the loudest at 118 decibels, comparable to a turbofan aircraft at takeoff power. Noise levels up to 125 decibels have been measured, close to the pain threshold for the human ear. Basketball writer John Feinstein once likened the experience of a visiting team in The Pit to "watching Roman gladiators emerging into a wall of sound."

Further contributing to the intimidating environment for visitors is its near-mile-high elevation, where the court is around 5,100 feet (1,555 m) above sea level. This is impressed upon visiting teams with posters in the locker room providing information on the warning signs of altitude sickness and urging victims to seek immediate medical attention. In addition, the tunnel leading from the locker rooms down to the playing floor has a message painted on the wall stating, "Welcome to the legendary Pit, a mile high and louder than..."

The Pit has garnered high praise from sports publications, announcers, and opposing coaches. In 1999, Sports Illustrated listed The Pit as 13th in its feature on the Top 20 Sporting Venues of the 20th Century, ahead of such locations as Daytona Speedway, Notre Dame Stadium, and the Rose Bowl. Sports writers from USA Today, Fox Sports, and Rivals.com have also recognized The Pit among top venues in college basketball. Jim Boeheim has stated that the game he coached in The Pit was one of the most exciting of his career, and Lute Olson has observed that The Pit crowd can dictate the tempo and momentum of a game. Rick Majerus, whose 5–11 record against the Lobos at The Pit ties him with Don Haskins for most wins by a visiting coach, praised the intensity and dedication of Lobo fans and their knowledge of the game, and Steve Fisher has echoed those sentiments.

=== Renovations ===
Logo used prior to 2014

The Pit has undergone two major renovations. In 1975 the arena was expanded at a cost of $2.2 million. A cantilevered deck was extended above the original seating for meeting space, offices, and a mezzanine level with 2,300 additional seats. The concourse was enlarged to allow concession space to be quadrupled, along with dedicated standing-room only space, increasing seating capacity for basketball events to 18,018.

The second renovation, begun in 2009, was completed in time for the 2010–11 basketball season, costing $60 million and bringing the facilities up to state-of-the-art standards. The renovation added 60,000 square feet (5,600 m^{2}) of new space, with new amenities such as forty luxury suites and 365 club seats, digital signage and video boards, expanded concourses, additional restrooms and concession stands, a new ticket office and Lobo store, interactive kiosks, and a UNM Lettermen's Lounge. New locker rooms for both men's and women's squads were added, as well as an upgraded strength and conditioning center and training facilities. Project architect John Pate of Molzen-Corbin in Albuquerque recognized the need to tread gently in designing changes to preserve the historic character of the building. "Players like the noise," he noted. "They want to keep it loud in there." The upgrade reduced seating capacity to 15,411, trading some seating for greater comfort and amenities.

The building facade was transformed from simple red brick to a high-rise look with a 56-foot (17 m) glass tower, lit from within and supported by a steel superstructure. The shape of the roof was curved into a half-figure-8 to be more visually interesting than its former box-like appearance. Extensive glasswork encases the street level, adding light and providing views of the Sandia Mountains to the east and picturesque Southwest sunsets to the west. "We're building a little jewel box around the building," said Pate. "We want the Pit to be seen as an urban destination ... an attractive, up-to-date building with better access for everyone." The building also achieves high environmental standards, with water efficiencies and heating and cooling processes designed to minimize energy loss, while 95 percent of all waste materials from the renovation were recycled.

In 2006, prior to the renovation, UNM dedicated the Rudy Davalos Basketball Center, named after the then-departing athletics director, located adjacent to the south end of The Pit. The 26,000-square-foot (2,400 m^{2}) facility includes practice courts, offices for coaches, a video control room and theater, and a multi-purpose room for press conferences and special events. The recent renovations integrated the Davalos Center with The Pit, allowing players to move seamlessly between the two facilities for practice, games, and training.

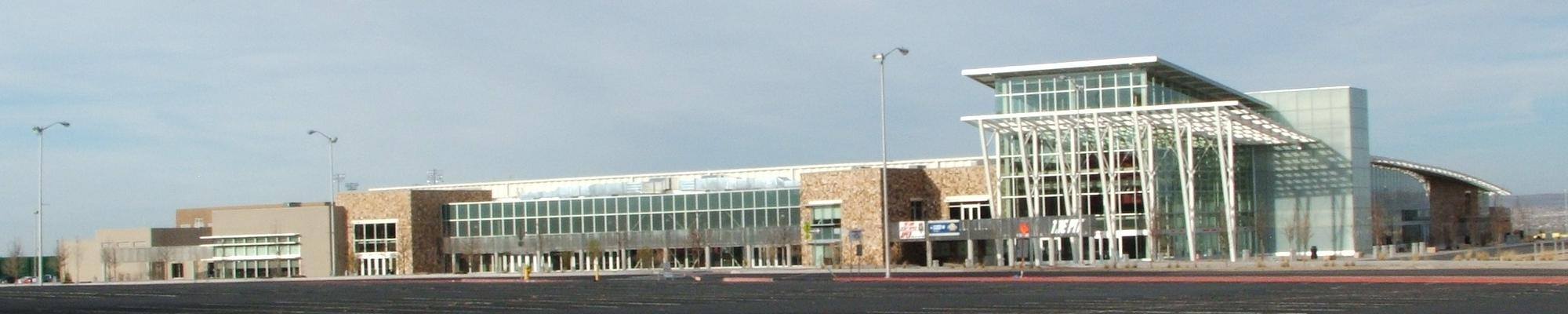
The Pit (east facade, viewed from University Stadium) in 2011

=== Naming rights ===
On December 1, 2014, the University of New Mexico announced that naming rights to the arena had been purchased by Albuquerque-based pizza chain WisePies for $5 million over 10 years. The formal name of the building became "WisePies Arena (aka The Pit)." On April 27, 2017, UNM asked WisePies to relinquish the naming rights, per the terms of the agreement, and WisePies agreed to do so. UNM hoped to get a more lucrative deal.

On May 3, 2017, UNM announced a $10 million naming rights agreement with Dreamstyle Remodeling, a local Albuquerque construction business, covering both The Pit and the UNM football stadium. The official name of the facilities became Dreamstyle Arena and Dreamstyle Stadium.

On September 18, 2020, UNM announced that the naming deal had been discontinued and removed all exterior Dreamstyle signage from the arena and Dreamstyle Stadium "while the two sides are trying to resolve the [naming rights] issue."

On February 26, 2026, UNM announced that Albuquerque-based Nusenda Credit Union had purchased the naming rights for ten years worth $1.74 million each year. The arena's formal name was changed to "The Pit - Powered by Nusenda."

== The Lobos at The Pit ==
Lobo records at The Pit	(entering the 2013–14 season)
The First Game	December 1, 1966
Total Games	825
All-Time W-L Record	674–151 (.817)
Non-Conference Records	409–74 (.847)
Conference Records	265–77 (.775)
Longest winning streak	41 (2/10/96 – 2/19/98)
Best Winning Percentage, Season	18–0 (1996–97); 15–0 (1973–74)
Most Wins, Season	19 (4 times, last 1998–99 (19–1))
Attendance average, per game	15,437

== The Lobos women ==
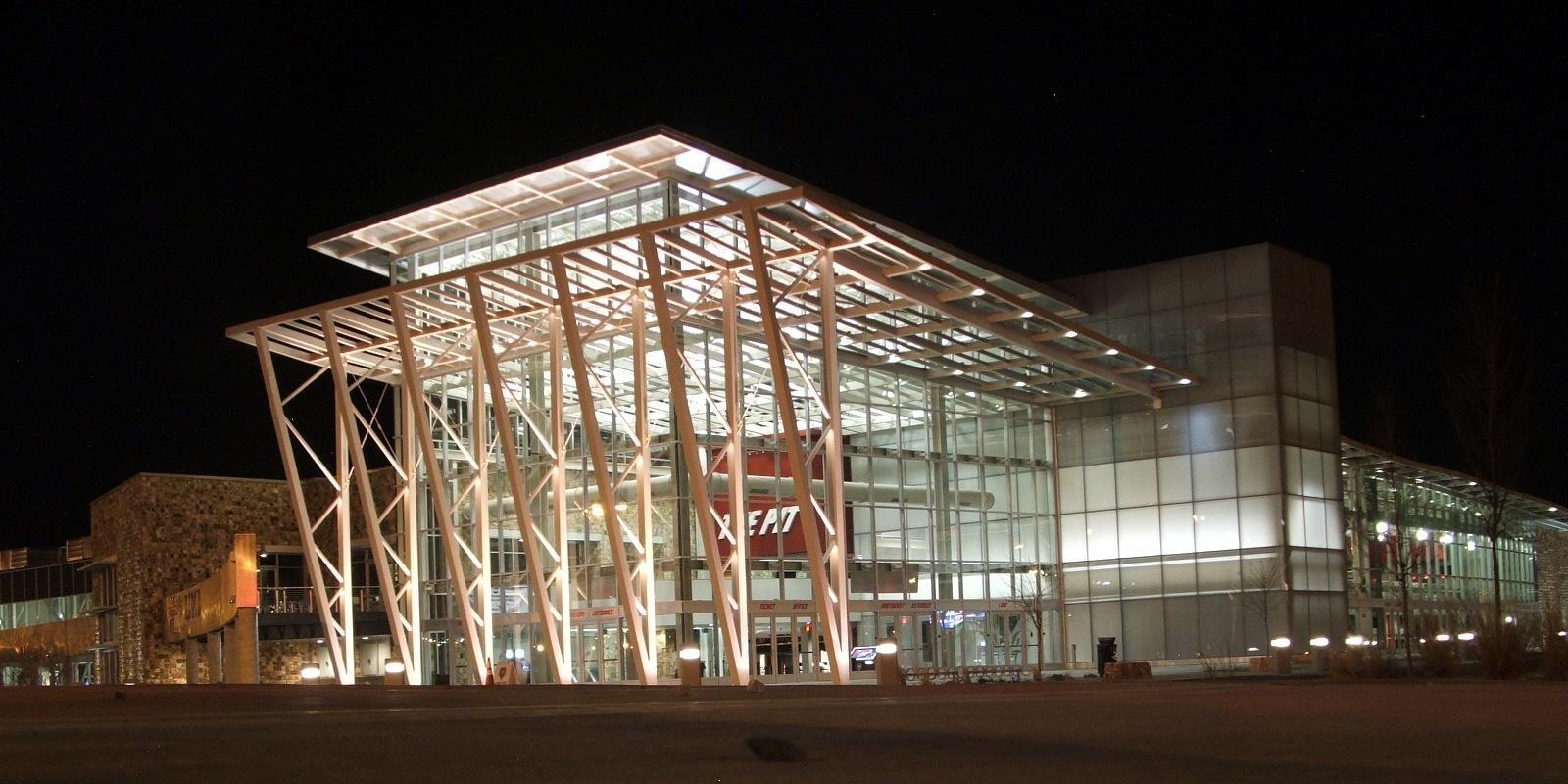
The Pit

The New Mexico women's basketball team also enjoys the home court advantage of The Pit. The Lady Lobos reached national prominence under former head coach Don Flanagan (1995–2011), who compiled an overall record of 340–168 (.669), including 228–59 (.794) at The Pit, making him the winningest coach in New Mexico basketball history. Flanagan's teams won six Mountain West Conference titles and made eight appearances in the NCAA Women's basketball tournament, reaching the Sweet Sixteen in 2003. The Pit hosted Lobos games in the NCAA tournament in 2003, 2004, and 2008, with the team posting a 2–3 record. The Lobos under Flanagan also made five appearances in the post-season Women's National Invitation Tournament, including a 7–3 record in games at The Pit in 1999–2001 and 2010. In 2001 they reached the WNIT championship game, played at The Pit, losing to Ohio State.

The Lobos women have been in the top 10 nationally in average attendance since 1998–99. They have sold out The Pit nine times in that period, filling the arena five times to its former regular season capacity of 18,018. Four times they sold out NCAA tournament games with capacity over 16,000. In 2002–03, UNM ranked fourth nationally, averaging 11,896 per game, their best season total, and they averaged over 8,000 fans per game during Flanagan's tenure.

== Tournament site ==
The Pit hosted the 1983 NCAA Final Four, the scene of a memorable NCAA Final upset by North Carolina State over heavily favored Houston, as Lorenzo Charles dunked the ball off a Dereck Whittenburg miss to win it. This was also the last men's Final Four event held on a college campus, and one of the last not held in an indoor stadium.

The Pit has frequently been a venue for NCAA men's basketball tournaments, hosting games in 1968, 1978, 1985, 1992, 1996, 2000, 2002, 2005, and 2012. It also hosted the Western Athletic Conference men's tournaments in 1987, 1995, and 1996. The Pit has hosted NCAA women's tournament games in 2003, 2004, 2006, 2008, 2009, and 2011.

The Lobos have compiled a 15–6 record in the NIT at The Pit, winning their last ten games since 1990.

=== Men's NCAA tournament games ===
Event	The Game	Attendance
1968 West Regional	UCLA 58 New Mexico State 49 Santa Clara 86 New Mexico 73 New Mexico State 62 New Mexico 58 UCLA 87 Santa Clara 66	15,345 15,010
1978 West Regional	Sweet Sixteen Arkansas 74 UCLA 70 Cal State Fullerton 75 San Francisco 72 Elite Eight Arkansas 61 Cal State Fullerton 58	17,750 18,144
1983 Final Four	Final Four North Carolina State 67 Georgia 60 Houston 94 Louisville 81 Championship North Carolina State 54 Houston 52	17,300 17,327
1985 West First & Second Rounds	First Round UTEP 79 Tulsa 75 North Carolina State 65 Nevada 56 Alabama 50 Arizona 41 Virginia Commonwealth 81 Marshall 65 Second Round Alabama 63 Virginia Commonwealth 59 North Carolina State 86 UTEP 73	11,932 12,256 13,833
1992 West Regional	Sweet Sixteen Indiana 85 Florida State 74 UCLA 85 New Mexico State 78 Elite Eight Indiana 106 UCLA 79	15,914 16,160
1996 West First & Second Rounds	First Round Syracuse 88 Montana State 55 Drexel 75 Memphis 63 Purdue 73 Western Carolina 71 Georgia 81 Clemson 74 Second Round Georgia 76 Purdue 69 Syracuse 69 Drexel 58	14,283 14,762 15,792
2000 West Regional	Sweet 16 Wisconsin 61 LSU 48 Purdue 75 Gonzaga 66 Elite Eight Wisconsin 64 Purdue 60	16,004 16,004
2002 First and Second Rounds	First Round Missouri 93 Miami (FL) 80 Ohio State 69 Davidson 64 Wyoming 73 Gonzaga 66 Arizona 86 UC Santa Barbara 81 Second Round Missouri 83 Ohio State 67 Arizona 68 Wyoming 60	13,661 15,626 15,867
2005 Albuquerque Regional	Sweet 16 Louisville 93 Washington 79 West Virginia 65 Texas Tech 60 Elite Eight Louisville 93 West Virginia 85	15,792 15,896
2012 2nd and 3rd round	Second Round Vanderbilt 79 Harvard 70 Wisconsin 73 Montana 49 Colorado 68 UNLV 64 Baylor 68 South Dakota State 60 Third Round Wisconsin 60 Vanderbilt 57 Baylor 80 Colorado 63	10,774 11,389 12,128

== Other basketball events ==
The Pit hosted one of the eight regionals in the 2022 edition of The Basketball Tournament, a 64-team summer event with a $1 million winner-take-all prize.

== Non-basketball events ==
The arena was the site of the 1992 NCAA Division I women's volleyball tournament. The 2009 renovations increased the viability of the Pit as a multipurpose venue. In recent years it has been the Albuquerque home of WWE and is the site of the Professional Bull Riders Ty Murray Invitational, part of the Unleash the Beast Series. Both events previously were held at Tingley Coliseum.

=== Concerts ===
The Pit has been New Mexico's largest arena since it opened, the largest indoor venue between Dallas and Phoenix, and also hosts major concert tours. Those appearing at the Pit have included Led Zeppelin, Queen (with Paul Rodgers), Foreigner, Billy Graham, Taylor Swift, Bob Seger, Brad Paisley, George Strait, Billy Joel, The Eagles., and Elton John.

== See also ==
- List of NCAA Division I basketball arenas
