= Csiba =

Csiba is the Hungarian name for two villages in Romania:

- Ciba village, Miercurea-Ciuc City, Harghita County
- Ciba village, Câmpeni Commune, Mureș County
