= Central Institute of Brackishwater Aquaculture =

Indian aquaculture research facility

- Other name: CIBA
- Type: Registered society
- Established: 1987; 39 years ago
- Location: Chennai, Tamil Nadu, India; 13°1′30″N 80°15′27″E
- Campus: Raja Annamalai Puram, Chennai
- Website: CIBA

Central Institute of Brackishwater Aquaculture (CIBA) is one of the research institutes under Indian Council of Agricultural Research (ICAR), New Delhi to serve as the nodal agency for catering to the needs of the brackishwater aquaculture research in India. The institute is headquartered at Santhome High Road, Raja Annamalai Puram, Chennai with a research centre at Kakdwip in West Bengal and an experimental field station at Muttukadu, roughly 30 km to the south of Chennai. The institute works under the Ministry of Agriculture, India.

== Service profile ==
The Central Institute of Brackishwater Aquaculture assists small aqua farmers in optimising their finfish and shrimp farming by providing suitable modern technologies. They also offer study courses and research facilities for students, farmers and entrepreneurs. CIBA regularly conducts farmers’ meet, trainings, exhibitions, workshops, and brainstorming sessions.

== Mandate of CIBA ==
CIBA was formed, under Indian Council of Agricultural Research, with a mandate to:

- conduct research for development of techno-economically viable and sustainable culture systems for finfish and shellfish in brackish water.
- act as a repository of information on brackish water fishery resources with a systematic database
- undertake transfer of technology through training, education and extension programmes
- provide consultancy services

== Divisions ==
The organization has the following research divisions for the development of marine science

=== Crustacean Culture Division (CCD) ===
The Division deals with research on crustaceans such as:

- Maturation and seed production
- Nursery rearing and culture
- Area development and impact assessment
- Molecular approach in disease diagnostics and species identification

=== Finfish Culture Division (FCD) ===
FCD deals with brackish water fish such as Asian Seabass, Mullets, King fish and Milk fish with special emphasis on domestication, production under controlled conditions, spawning, breeding, maturation and broodstock management.

=== Nutrition, Genetics and Biotechnology Division (NGBD) ===
The principal focus of NGBD is fish feed development such as Crab feed, Seabass feed, Shrimp feed, Fish meal & fish oil replacement. The Division also conducts research on Genetics and Biotechnology.

=== Aquatic Animal Health and Environment Division (AAHED) ===
One of the 2005-07 studies estimated the national loss of shrimp production at 48717 metric tonnes of product and the economic loss due to diseases at Rs. 1022.13 crore per year. AAHED focuses on research to eliminate/minimise the aquatic health concerns due to Viral and bacterial diseases.

=== Social Sciences Division (SSD) ===
SSD conducts statistical research on:

- Sector analysis
- Extension, stakeholder interaction and requirement analysis
- Fish availability and livelihood analysis, motivating and facilitating factors and time management.

=== Kakdwip Research Centre (KRC) ===
KRC deals with research on shrimp farming in the coastal West Bengal. The Division emphasises the development of various shrimp varieties such as Mugil cephalus, L. tade, L. parsia and P. monodon in one trial and finfish such as Chanos chanos. They have a mechanism to collect extensive data from 400 brackish water aquaculture farms in the coastal districts of West Bengal and maintain a user-friendly relational database management system (RDBMS) for the traditional brackish water aquaculture system in West Bengal.

== Facilities ==
=== Agricultural Knowledge Management Unit (AKMU) ===
The Agricultural Knowledge Management Unit (AKMU) is the online connectivity platform for different research institutes, national centers and State Agricultural Universities. The also maintain databases on coastal aquaculture, provides advanced methods of communication and internet technologies and maintain and update the institute's web site.

=== Library ===
The institute has an extensive library on various disciplines of aquaculture and fisheries such as shrimp and fish grow-out culture technology, hatchery technology, physiology, nutrition, biotechnology, genetics, pathology, aquaculture engineering, pollution, toxicology, socio-economics and extension.

=== Laboratories ===
The institute has three laboratories:

- Health laboratory
- Nutrition laboratory
- KRC laboratory

=== Other facilities ===
CIBA also maintain other facilities such as Hatchery, Trainees' Hostel, Auditorium and Conference hall with video conferencing.

=== Patents ===
Nine patent applications have been filed by Dr. K.K. Krishnani of the Aquatic Animal Health and Environment Division, making him the highest individual applicant at CIBA
