= East Hartford High School =

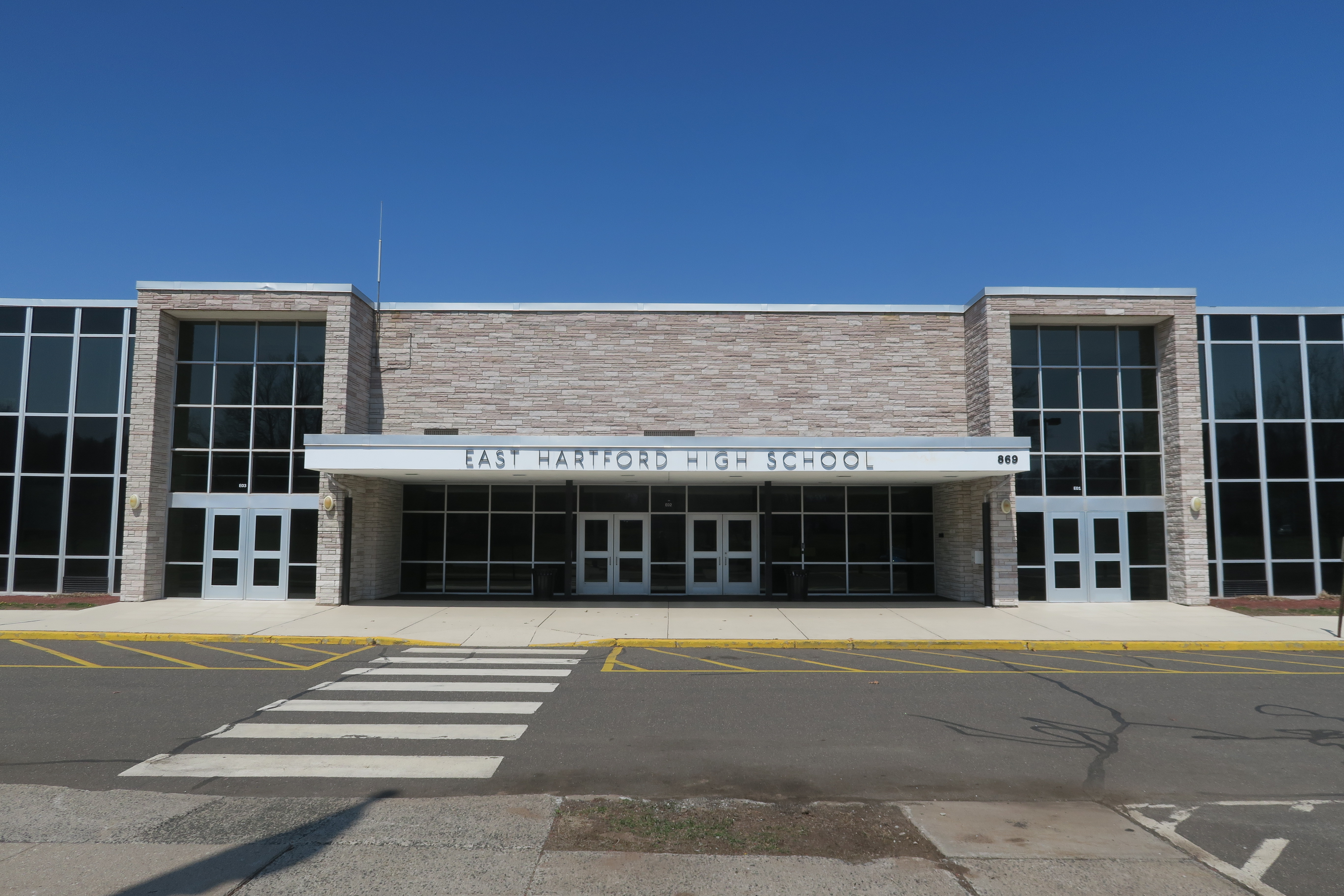

Location
- 869 Forbes Street; East Hartford, Hartford County, Connecticut 06118; United States
- 41°45′16″N 72°36′18″W

Information
- Type: Public school
- School district: East Hartford Public Schools
- Superintendent: Thomas Anderson
- CEEB code: 070170
- Principal: Matthew Ryan
- Teaching staff: 129.40 (on an FTE basis)
- Grades: 9–12
- Enrollment: 1,723 (2023-2024)
- Student to teacher ratio: 13.32
- Colors: Black and Gold
- Team name: Hornets
- Website: ehhs.easthartford.org

East Hartford High School is a public high school of the East Hartford, Connecticut Public Schools. East Hartford High Schools shares its campus and many of its programs with the Connecticut International Baccalaureate Academy (CIBA), an honors college-preparatory high school for grades 9–12.

== History ==
The current East Hartford High was created in 1985 by merging with George J. Penney High School, which originated in 1962, named for a former East Hartford public works director.

== Notable alumni ==
- Patrick Agyemang, soccer player
- John B. Larson, former Chairman of the Democratic Caucus of the United States House of Representatives, graduated in the class of 1967
- Will Solomon, former NBA player and professional basketball player
- Diane Venora, actress and producer, graduated in the class of 1970
