= Connecticut IB Academy =

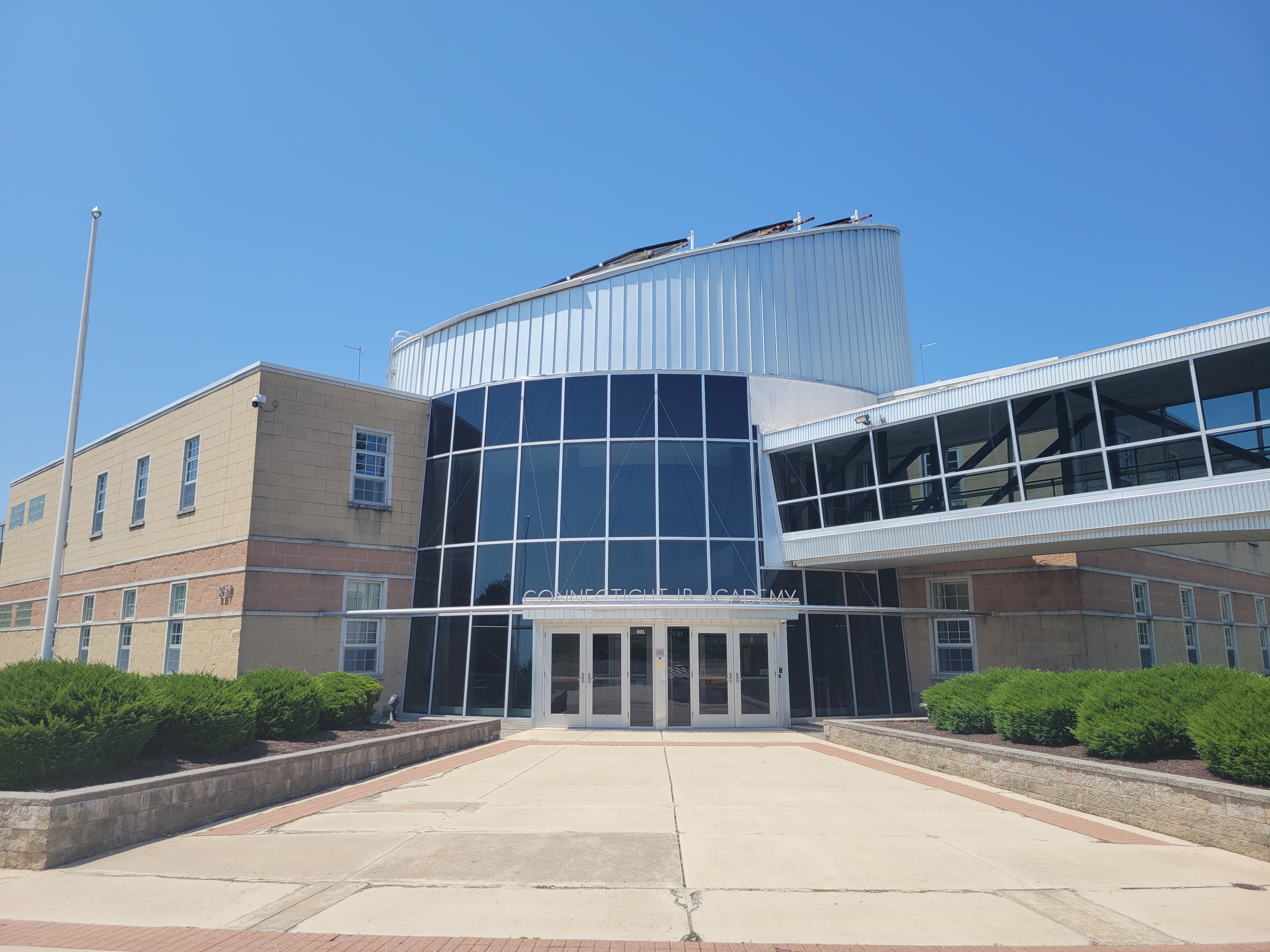

Location
- 857 Forbes Street; East Hartford, Connecticut 06118; United States
- Coordinates: 41°45′08″N 72°36′19″W

Information
- Type: Public school
- CEEB code: 070169
- Principal: Michelle Marion
- Enrollment: 191 (2018-2019)
- Website: ciba.easthartford.org

Connecticut IB Academy (CIBA) is an interdistrict magnet school located in East Hartford, Connecticut. It is next door to East Hartford High School; the two are connected by a bridge.

The Connecticut IB Academy is an International Baccalaureate World School, offering the Diploma Programme in Grades 11 and 12 and the Middle Years Programme in grades 9 and 10. The school is located on the campus of East Hartford High School and the two schools share the same bell schedule, allowing students to take classes in either building. CIBA students also participate in all athletics, band orchestra and drama programs at East Hartford High School. CIBA's current principal is Michelle Marion.

CIBA is part of the East Hartford Public School system and is under the jurisdiction of Mr. Tom Anderson, Superintendent of East Hartford Public Schools.

CIBA is a distinguished Blue Ribbon School, ranked among the best in America by the U.S. Department of Education. In 2009, CIBA was recognized by Magnet Schools of America as "the top secondary magnet school in the country." As of 2024, it is ranked #1 in Connecticut by U.S. News & World Report.
