= Stone Academy (Connecticut) =

Stone Academy was a private, for-profit college in Connecticut focused on educating students for careers in the medical field. It had three branches: East Hartford, West Haven, and Waterbury, Connecticut. It traced its roots to the United States College of Business and Finance founded in 1864.

The college's abrupt closure in early 2023 led the state to open multiple investigations of the college's operations. In July 2023, Connecticut Attorney General William Tong sued the Stone Academy, alleging violations of the Connecticut Unfair Trade Practices Act and demanding millions of dollars in penalties and restitution for students allegedly deceived by the Academy and its owners.
