= Wickham Park (Manchester, Connecticut) =

Park in Connecticut, United States

- Interactive map of Wickham Park
- Type: Urban park
- Location: Manchester, Connecticut
- Coordinates: 41°47′7″N 72°34′44″W
- Area: 280 acres (110 ha)
- Created: 1960

Wickham Park is a nonprofit, private foundation in Manchester and a small part of East Hartford, Connecticut. The park contains 280 acres (1.1 km^{2}) of gardens, open fields, woodlands, ponds, picnic areas and sports facilities, among other attractions.

== History ==
130 acres (0.53 km^{2}) of the park was a gift from Clarence Horace Wickham. Another 67 acres (270,000 m^{2}) were given by Myrtle Williams in 1967, who owned land adjacent to the original property. Olmsted Associates of Brookline, Massachusetts were the designers for the original park layout.

Wickham was an industrialist who invented the window envelope, used in mailing and business. He managed a successful envelope business with his father, Horace John Wickham. He also established the Wickham Memorial Library in East Hartford, Connecticut.

Bank of America finances both the operation and maintenance of the park through a trust established by the Wickham estate.

== Cross Country Racing at Wickham Park ==
=== High School Cross Country ===
Wickham Park hosts the Connecticut State Class Championships, the State Open Championships, and The Wickham Invitational Race every year. In 2006 the course was changed to make the course more of a cross country course and less of a road course. The 5k (3.1 mi.) course at Wickham Park is famous for "The Green Monster" which is the course's most difficult hill located about 1.5-1.75 miles into the race. The finish of the course is slightly uphill.

With the 2006 changes, the best high school runners in Connecticut completed the course in just under 16 minutes. In previous years the winning times were usually 15:25 or less. This increase of about 30–40 seconds is mostly due to a large change in the course after the one-mile (1.6 km) mark, when the course turns onto a wood-chip trail that leads runners downhill around the finish line of the course instead of taking a road down past (in front of) the finish.

Since the course change in 2006, Alex Ostberg of Darien High School has the male course record of 14:58, and Kate Wiser of Pomperaug High School has the female record (set in 2019) of 17:39

=== Summer Grand Prix Series ===
The Manchester-based Silk City Striders running club hosts the Summer Grand Prix Cross Country Race Series, which has been an annual event at Wickham Park since 1991. The series consists of 5 race days in the months of July and August and includes a one-mile children's race and a 2.6 mile open race.
