= 2026–27 Baylor Bears women's basketball team =

Intercollegiate basketball season

2026–27 Baylor Bears women's basketball
- Conference: Big 12 Conference
- Record: 6–1 (0–0 Big 12)
- Head coach: Nicki Collen (6th season)
- Associate head coach: Tony Greene; Johnnie Harris
- Assistant coaches: Aaron Sternecker; Jaelyn Richard Harris; Tez Dumars
- Home arena: Foster Pavilion

2026–27 Big 12 women's basketball standings
	Conf.				Overall
Team	W		L	PCT	W		L	PCT
BYU	0	–	0	–	7	–	0	1.000
No. 15 TCU	0	–	0	–	7	–	0	1.000
Arizona State	0	–	0	–	6	–	0	1.000
Houston	0	–	0	–	6	–	0	1.000
Iowa State	0	–	0	–	6	–	0	1.000
Utah	0	–	0	–	6	–	0	1.000
Colorado	0	–	0	–	5	–	0	1.000
No. 22 West Virginia	0	–	0	–	5	–	0	1.000
No. 25 Oklahoma State	0	–	0	–	6	–	1	.857
Baylor	0	–	0	–	5	–	1	.833
Kansas State	0	–	0	–	5	–	1	.833
Texas Tech	0	–	0	–	5	–	1	.833
Arizona	0	–	0	–	4	–	1	.800
UCF	0	–	0	–	6	–	2	.750
Cincinnati	0	–	0	–	4	–	2	.667
Kansas	0	–	0	–	3	–	2	.600
† 2027 Big 12 tournament winner As of November 22, 2026; Rankings from AP poll

The 2026–27 Baylor Bears women's basketball team currently represents Baylor University during the 2026–27 NCAA Division I women's basketball season. The Bears, led by fifth-year head coach Nicki Collen, play their home games at the Foster Pavilion in Waco, Texas and compete as a member of the Big 12 Conference.

== Previous season ==
The Bears finished the 2025–26 season 25–9 overall and 13–5 in Big 12 play, to finish third in the conference. As the No. 3 seed in the Big 12 tournament, they earned a double-bye to the quarterfinals, where they lost to No. 6 Colorado.

Following the tournament loss, the Bears earned an at-large bid to the NCAA tournament, where they were seeded No. 6 in the Sacramento #2 Regional. They narrowly defeated No. 11 Nebraska 67–62 in the first round before falling to No. 3 Duke in the second round to end their season.

== Offseason ==
=== Departures ===
Baylor Departures
Name	Number	Pos.	Height	Year	Hometown	Reason for Departure
Kiersten Johnson	2	Forward	6'4"	Senior	Duncanville, TX	Graduated
Jana Van Gytenbeek	4	Guard	5'7"	Graduate Student	Greenwood Village, CO	Graduated
Darianna Littlepage-Buggs	5	Guard/Forward	6'1"	Senior	Oklahoma City, OK	Graduated; selected 30th overall by the Washington Mystics in the 2026 WNBA draft
Yuting Deng	7	Guard	6'2"	Sophomore	Hunan, China	Transferred to Oklahoma State
Kiera Pemberton	9	Forward	6'1"	Junior	Langley, BC	Transferred to San Diego
Bella Fontleroy	22	Guard/Forward	6'0"	Senior	Springfield, MO	Graduated; went undrafted in the 2026 WNBA draft, signed a training camp contract with the Atlanta Dream

=== Incoming transfers ===
Baylor incoming transfers
Name	Number	Pos.	Height	Year	Hometown	Previous School
Skylar Jones	4	Guard	6'0"	Senior	Chicago, IL	Louisville
Kate Koval	13	Forward	6'5"	Junior	Kyiv, Ukraine	LSU
Reece Ross	20	Forward	6'1"	Senior	Rapid City, SD	Utah
Tianna Thompson	35	Guard	5'10"	Junior	Atlanta, GA	Ole Miss
Trinity Turner	55	Guard	5'6"	Junior	Orlando, FL	Georgia

=== Recruiting class ===
There was no 2026 recruiting class.

== Preseason ==
On October 8, 2026, the Big 12 Conference released its annual preseason coaches poll and awards. Baylor was picked to finish third in the conference, along with two first place votes.

=== Preseason rankings ===
Big 12 Preseason Coaches Poll
Place	Team	Votes
1	Oklahoma State	215 (11)
2	TCU	212 (6)
3	Baylor	199 (2)
4	West Virginia	186 (1)
5	Kansas	160
6	Arizona State	143
7	BYU	137
8	Colorado	126
9	Kansas State	121
10	Texas Tech	103
11	Iowa State	78
12	Utah	77
13	Arizona	55
14	Cincinnati	43
15	Houston	38
16	UCF	27
(#) first-place votes

=== Preseason All-Big 12 Team ===
Preseason All-Big 12 Team
Player	Year	Position
Taliah Scott^{#}	Senior	Guard
^{#} unanimous selection

== Roster ==
Note: Years are listed according to new NCAA five-in-five eligibility regulations.

2026–27 Baylor Bears women's basketball team
Players
Coaches

Pos.	#	Name	Height	Year	Previous school	Hometown
G	0	Taliah Scott	5 ft 9 in (1.75 m)	Sr	St. Johns Country Day School; Auburn	Jacksonville, FL
G	1	Ines Goryanova	5 ft 8 in (1.73 m)	Jr	DME Academy	Sofia, Bulgaria
G	3	Ella Brow (5th)	5 ft 8 in (1.73 m)	Sr	Palm Beach Currumbin State High School; SMU	Palm Beach, Australia
G	4	Skylar Jones	6 ft 0 in (1.83 m)	Sr	Whitney Young High School; Louisville	Chicago, IL
F	8	Kayla Nelms	6 ft 1 in (1.85 m)	Jr	Miami Country Day School	Miami, FL
C	11	Lorena Awou	6 ft 5 in (1.96 m)	Jr	United Township High School; NC State	East Moline, IL
F	12	Kyla Abraham (5th)	6 ft 3 in (1.91 m)	Sr	Smithfield High School	Carrollton, VA
F	13	Kate Koval	6 ft 5 in (1.96 m)	Jr	Long Island Lutheran High School; LSU	Kyiv, Ukraine
F	20	Reece Ross	6 ft 1 in (1.85 m)	Sr	St. Thomas More High School; Utah	Rapid City, SD
G	21	Marcayla Johnson	6 ft 0 in (1.83 m)	So	Booker T. Washington High School	Tulsa, OK
G	35	Tianna Thompson	5 ft 10 in (1.78 m)	Jr	The Galloway School; Ole Miss	Atlanta, GA
G	55	Trinity Turner	5 ft 6 in (1.68 m)	Jr	Dr. Phillips High School; Georgia	Orlando, FL

Head coach

- Nicki Collen (Marquette)

Assistant coach(es)

- Tony Greene (Langston)
- Johnnie Harris (Arkansas Baptist)
- Aaron Sternecker (Florida)
- Jaelyn Richard Harris (LSU)
- Tez Dumars (West Texas A&M)

Legend

- (C) Team captain
- (S) Suspended
- (I) Ineligible
- (W) Walk-on
- (5th) Fifth-year
- Injured
- Current redshirt

Roster
Last update: August 6, 2026

== Schedule and results ==
Date time, TV	Rank^{#}	Opponent^{#}	Result	Record	High points	High rebounds	High assists	Site (attendance) city, state
Exhibition
October 25, 2026*; 2:00 p.m.		West Texas A&M	W 96–56		19 – Awou	8 – Nelms	11 – Turner	Foster Pavilion; Waco, TX
October 29, 2026*; 7:00 p.m.		No. 6 Texas	L 64–85		20 – Turner	5 – Ross	3 – Turner	Moody Center; Austin, TX
Non-conference regular season
November 2, 2026*; 6:00 p.m., ESPN+		Fairleigh Dickinson	W 87–66	1–0	15 – Scott	13 – Ross	10 – Turner	Foster Pavilion (2,843); Waco, TX
November 5, 2026*; 7:00 p.m., ESPN+		Central Arkansas	W 72–44	2–0	14 – Scott	9 – Turner	11 – Turner	Foster Pavilion (3,031); Waco, TX
November 8, 2026*; 2:00 p.m., ESPN+		Texas A&M–Corpus Christi	W 112–40	3–0	23 – Thompson	12 – Koval	8 – Turner	Foster Pavilion (2,878); Waco, TX
November 12, 2026*; 7:00 p.m., ESPN+		Prairie View A&M	W 121–43	4–0	25 – Nelms	12 – Koval	9 – Turner	Foster Pavilion (2,638); Waco, TX
November 15, 2026*; 2:00 p.m., ESPN+		East Texas A&M	W 100–66	5–0	20 – Scott	13 – Koval	5 – Scott	Foster Pavilion; Waco, TX
November 20, 2026*; 10:00 p.m., BTN		vs. No. 4 USC; Hollywood Hardwood Classic	L 68–79	5–1	24 – Scott	11 – Ross	10 – Turner	Intuit Dome (3,390); Inglewood, CA
November 22, 2026*; 2:00 p.m., ESPN+		Northern Kentucky	W 96–42	6–1	18 – Koval	11 – Ross	6 – Scott	Foster Pavilion; Waco, TX
November 27, 2026*; 4:30 p.m., ESPN+		vs. Penn State; Paradise Jam Reef Division semifinal						UVI Sports and Fitness Center; Charlotte Amalie, USVI
November 28, 2026*; 4:30 or 7:00 p.m., ESPN+		vs. Seton Hall or South Florida; Paradise Jam Reef Division						UVI Sports and Fitness Center; Charlotte Amalie, USVI
December 2, 2026*; 6:30 p.m., ESPN+		at North Texas						The Super Pit; Denton, TX
December 6, 2026*; 2:00 p.m., ESPN+		UTSA						Foster Pavilion; Waco, TX
December 9, 2026*; 11:00 a.m., ESPN+		Texas Southern						Foster Pavilion; Waco, TX
December 18, 2026*; 5:00 p.m., ESPN2		vs. Tennessee; Bad Boy Mower Series – Nashville						Bridgestone Arena; Nashville, TN
Big 12 regular season
December 21, 2026; 7:00 p.m., ESPN+		at Houston						Fertitta Center; Houston, TX
December 30, 2026; 6:00 p.m., ESPN+		Texas Tech						Foster Pavilion; Waco, TX
January 2, 2027; 5:00 p.m., CBSSN		at Colorado						CU Events Center; Boulder, CO
January 6, 2027; 7:00 p.m., ESPN+		BYU						Foster Pavilion; Waco, TX
January 9, 2027; 7:30 p.m., CBSSN		at Kansas						Allen Fieldhouse; Lawrence, KS
January 14, 2027; 8:00 p.m., ESPN2		at TCU						Schollmaier Arena; Fort Worth, TX
January 17, 2027; 4:00 p.m., ESPN		West Virginia						Foster Pavilion; Waco, TX
January 20, 2027; 6:00 p.m., ESPN+		at Texas Tech						United Supermarkets Arena; Lubbock, TX
January 23, 2027; 5:00 p.m., ESPN+		Utah						Foster Pavilion; Waco, TX
January 30, 2027; 3:00 p.m., FS1		Iowa State						Foster Pavilion; Waco, TX
February 3, 2027; 7:00 p.m., ESPN+		Cincinnati						Foster Pavilion; Waco, TX
February 7, 2027; 1:00 p.m., ESPN+		at UCF						Addition Financial Arena; Orlando, FL
February 10, 2027; 7:00 p.m., ESPN+		Kansas State						Foster Pavilion; Waco, TX
February 13, 2027; 3:00 p.m., ESPN+		at Arizona						McKale Center; Tucson, AZ
February 16, 2027; 9:00 p.m., FS1		at Arizona State						Desert Financial Arena; Tempe, AZ
February 21, 2027; 3:00 p.m., ESPN/ESPN2		Oklahoma State						Foster Pavilion; Waco, TX
February 25, 2027; 7:30 p.m., FS1		at Kansas State						Bramlage Coliseum; Manhattan, KS
February 28, 2027; 3:00 p.m., FS1		TCU						Foster Pavilion; Waco, TX
Big 12 tournament
March 3–8, 2027; TBA		vs.						T-Mobile Center; Kansas City, MO
*Non-conference game. ^{#}Rankings from AP Poll. (#) Tournament seedings in parentheses. All times are in Central.

== Rankings ==
Ranking movements Legend: RV = Received votes
	Week																				
Poll	Pre	1	2	3	4	5	6	7	8	9	10	11	12	13	14	15	16	17	18	19	Final
AP	RV	RV	RV																		
Coaches	RV	RV	RV																		
