= 2026–27 Arizona Wildcats women's basketball team =

American collegiate basketball season

2026–27 Arizona Wildcats women's basketball
- Conference: Big 12 Conference
- Record: 4–1 (0–0 Big 12)
- Head coach: Becky Burke (2nd season)
- Associate head coach: Todd Starkey (1st season)
- Assistant coaches: Julie Hairgrove (2nd season); James Ewing (2nd season); Jenna Knudson (2nd season); Devan Newman (1st season)
- Home arena: McKale Center

2026–27 Big 12 women's basketball standings
	Conf.				Overall
Team	W		L	PCT	W		L	PCT
No. 15 TCU	0	–	0	–	7	–	0	1.000
BYU	0	–	0	–	6	–	0	1.000
Iowa State	0	–	0	–	6	–	0	1.000
Arizona State	0	–	0	–	5	–	0	1.000
Baylor	0	–	0	–	5	–	0	1.000
Colorado	0	–	0	–	5	–	0	1.000
Houston	0	–	0	–	5	–	0	1.000
Utah	0	–	0	–	5	–	0	1.000
No. 22 West Virginia	0	–	0	–	5	–	0	1.000
UCF	0	–	0	–	6	–	1	.857
Kansas State	0	–	0	–	5	–	1	.833
No. 25 Oklahoma State	0	–	0	–	5	–	1	.833
Arizona	0	–	0	–	4	–	1	.800
Cincinnati	0	–	0	–	4	–	1	.800
Texas Tech	0	–	0	–	4	–	1	.800
Kansas	0	–	0	–	3	–	2	.600
† 2027 Big 12 tournament winner As of November 20, 2026; Rankings from AP poll

The 2026–27 Arizona Wildcats women's basketball team currently represents the University of Arizona during the 2026–27 NCAA Division I women's basketball season. The Wildcats, led by second-year head coach Becky Burke, play their games at the McKale Center in Tucson, Arizona as a member of the Big 12 Conference.

== Previous season ==
The Wildcats finished the 2025–26 season 12–18 overall and 3–15 in Big 12 play, to finish in a tie for fourteenth in the conference with UCF. As the No. 14 seed in the Big 12 tournament, they lost in the first round to rival No. 10 Arizona State.

== Offseason ==
=== Departures ===
Arizona departures
Name	Num	Pos.	Height	Year	Hometown	Reason for departure
Mickayla Perdue	0	Guard	5'7"	Graduate Student	Springfield, OH	Graduated
Kamryn Kitchen	1	Guard	5'9"	Junior	Charlotte, NC	Transferred to Coastal Carolina
Noelani Cornfield	4	Guard	5'6"	Graduate Student	Gowanda, NY	Graduated
Mireia Jurado	8	Guard	6'0"	Freshman	Avinyó, Spain	Transferred to Loyola Chicago
Freddie Wallace	10	Forward	6'2"	Senior	Lincoln, NE	Graduated
Tanyuel Welch	11	Guard	5'10"	(redshirt) Senior	Indianapolis, IN	Transferred to Missouri
Montaya Dew	12	Forward	6'2"	(redshirt) Junior	Las Vegas, NV	Medically retired
Nora Francois	13	Center	6'2"	Graduate Student	Minneapolis, MN	Graduated
Blessing Adebanjo	14	Forward	6'3"	Sophomore	Lagos, Nigeria	Transferred to Georgia
Achol Magot	20	Center	6'7"	Junior	Tucson, AZ	Transferred to Sacramento State
Daniah Trammell	33	Forward	6'1"	Freshman	Cincinnati, OH	Transferred to Arkansas

=== Incoming transfers ===
Arizona incoming transfers
Name	Num	Pos.	Height	Year	Hometown	Previous School
Gerda Raulušaityte	8	Forward/Center	6'2"	Junior	Varėna, Lithuania	USC
Aliyahna "Puff" Morris	25	Guard	5'5"	Freshman	Rancho Cucamonga, CA	California
Anastasiia Semenova	31	Forward	6'2"	Graduate Student	Saint Petersburg, Russia	Boston University
Breanna Williams	40	Forward	6'2"	(redshirt) Freshman	Billings, MT	Maryland

=== Recruiting class ===
College recruiting
Name	Hometown	School	Height	Weight	Commit date
Arynn Finley; G	Rancho Cucamonga, CA	Etiwanda High School	5 ft 10 in (1.78 m)	N/A	Mar 26, 2026
Arynn Finley; G	Recruit ratings: Rivals: 247Sports: ESPN: (94)				
Jasleen Green; G	Ocala, FL	Grandview Prep	5 ft 8 in (1.73 m)	N/A	Aug 30, 2025
Jasleen Green; G	Recruit ratings: Rivals: 247Sports: ESPN: (93)				
Makayla Presser-Palmer; G	East Springfield, PA	Northwestern Senior High School	5 ft 11 in (1.80 m)	N/A	Sep 13, 2025
Makayla Presser-Palmer; G	Recruit ratings: 247Sports: ESPN: (93)				
Callie Hinder; C	Chandler, AZ	Phoenix PPH Prep	6 ft 6 in (1.98 m)	N/A	
Callie Hinder; C	Recruit ratings: Rivals:				
Overall recruit ranking: ESPN: 17
Note: In many cases, Scout, Rivals, 247Sports, On3, and ESPN may conflict in their listings of height and weight.; In these cases, the average was taken. ESPN grades are on a 100-point scale.; Sources: "2026 Player Commits". ESPN. Archived from the original on April 20, 2026.; "2026 Team Ranking". Rivals.

== Preseason ==
On October 8, 2026, the Big 12 Conference released its annual preseason coaches poll and awards. Arizona was picked to finish thirteenth in the conference.

=== Preseason rankings ===
Big 12 Preseason Coaches Poll
Place	Team	Votes
1	Oklahoma State	215 (1)
2	TCU	212 (6)
3	Baylor	199 (2)
4	West Virginia	186 (1)
5	Kansas	160
6	Arizona State	143
7	BYU	137
8	Colorado	126
9	Kansas State	121
10	Texas Tech	103
11	Iowa State	78
12	Utah	77
13	Arizona	55
14	Cincinnati	43
15	Houston	38
16	UCF	27
(#) first-place votes

=== Preseason All-Big 12 Team ===
No players were named to the Preseason All-Big 12 Team.

== Roster ==
2026–27 Arizona Wildcats women's basketball team
Players
Coaches

Pos.	#	Name	Height	Year	Previous school	Hometown
G	2	Arynn Finley	5 ft 10 in (1.78 m)	Fr	Etiwanda High School	Rancho Cucamonga, CA
G	3	Sumayah Sugapong	5 ft 7 in (1.7 m)	Sr	La Jolla Country Day School; UC San Diego	San Diego, CA
G	5	Molly Ladwig	5 ft 9 in (1.75 m)	So	Skutt Catholic	Omaha, NE
F	8	Gerda Raulušaityte	6 ft 3 in (1.91 m)	Sr	Vilnius Ozas Gymnasium; USC	Varėna, Lithuania
F	10	Callie Hinder	6 ft 6 in (1.98 m)	Fr	Phoenix PPH Prep (AZ)	Chandler, AZ
G/F	12	Makayla Presser-Palmer	5 ft 11 in (1.8 m)	Fr	Northwestern Senior High School	East Springfield, PA
G	13	Karolina Ulan	6 ft 1 in (1.85 m)	Fr	VBW Gdynia	Warsaw, Poland
G	24	Priyanka Ponnam	6 ft 2 in (1.88 m)	Fr	Blair Academy	Pennington, NJ
G	25	Aliyahna Morris	5 ft 5 in (1.65 m)	So	Etiwanda High School; California	Rancho Cucamonga, CA
F	31	Anastasiia Semenova	6 ft 2 in (1.88 m)	GS	College of Olympic Reserve No. 1 Boston University	Saint Petersburg, Russia
G	35	Jasleen Green	5 ft 8 in (1.73 m)	Fr	Grandview Prep	Ocala, FL
G	40	Breanna Williams	6 ft 2 in (1.88 m)	RS So	Skyview High School; Maryland	Billings, MT

Head coach

- Becky Burke (Louisville)

Assistant coach(es)

- Todd Starkey (Montreat)
- James Ewing (Mercyhurst)
- Julie Hairgrove (Arizona)
- Devan Newman (Louisville)

Legend

- (C) Team captain
- (S) Suspended
- (I) Ineligible
- (W) Walk-on
- Injured
- Current redshirt

Roster
Last update: August 5, 2026

== Schedule and results ==
Date time, TV	Rank^{#}	Opponent^{#}	Result	Record	High points	High rebounds	High assists	Site (attendance) city, state
Exhibition
October 22, 2026*; 6:00 p.m.		Embry–Riddle	W 117–44		–	–	–	McKale Center; Tucson, AZ
October 27, 2026*; 6:00 p.m.		Cal State Monterey Bay	W 92–54		–	–	–	McKale Center; Tucson, AZ
Non-conference regular season
November 2, 2026*; 10:30 a.m., CBSSN		vs. Stanford; Women's Basketball Hall of Fame Series	W 84–69	1–0	23 – Williams	9 – Williams	5 – Morris	T-Mobile Arena; Paradise, NV
November 8, 2026*; 2:00 p.m., ESPN+		Iona	W 74–61	2–0	12 – Williams	7 – Williams	3 – Tied	McKale Center (4,841); Tucson, AZ
November 12, 2026*; 7:30 p.m., BTN		at No. 10т UCLA	L 44–76	2–1	8 – Tied (2)	5 – Tied (2)	4 – Presser-Palmer	Pauley Pavilion (2,578); Los Angeles, CA
November 15, 2026*; 7:00 p.m., ESPN+		Oregon State	W 84–80 ^{OT}	3–1	17 – Green	6 – Green	4 – Morris	McKale Center (4,717); Tucson, AZ
November 19, 2026*; 6:00 p.m., ESPN+		New Mexico State	W 62–55	4–1	17 – Morris	5 – Raulusaityte	3 – Sugapong	McKale Center (4,658); Tucson, AZ
November 23, 2026*; 3:00 p.m., Spiideo		vs. Vanderbilt; Jacksonville Classic						The Reef; Jacksonville, FL
November 25, 2026*; 11:30 a.m., Spiideo		vs. George Washington; Jacksonville Classic						The Reef; Jacksonville, FL
November 29, 2026*; 2:00 p.m., ESPN+		Sacramento State						McKale Center; Tucson, AZ
December 5, 2026*; 8:30 p.m., The CW		at New Mexico						The Pit; Albuquerque, NM
December 9, 2026*; 11:00 a.m., ESPN+		Southeast Missouri State						McKale Center; Tucson, AZ
December 13, 2026*; 2:00 p.m., ESPN+		Northern Arizona						McKale Center; Tucson, AZ
December 16, 2026*; 6:00 p.m., ESPN+		Oakland						McKale Center; Tucson, AZ
Big 12 regular season
December 19, 2026; 2:00 p.m., ESPN+		BYU						McKale Center; Tucson, AZ
December 30, 2026; 5:30 p.m., ESPN+		at Oklahoma State						Gallagher-Iba Arena; Stillwater, OK
January 3, 2027; 2:00 p.m., ESPN+		Iowa State						McKale Center; Tucson, AZ
January 6, 2027; 5:30 p.m., ESPN+		at Kansas						Allen Fieldhouse; Lawrence, KS
January 9, 2027; 4:00 p.m., ESPN+		at Kansas State						Bramlage Coliseum; Manhattan, KS
January 13, 2027; 6:00 p.m., ESPN+		Texas Tech						McKale Center; Tucson, AZ
January 17, 2027; 2:00 p.m., ESPN+		TCU						McKale Center; Tucson, AZ
January 20, 2027; 4:30 p.m., ESPN+		at UCF						Addition Financial Arena; Orlando, FL
January 23, 2027; 12:00 p.m., ESPN+		at Houston						Fertitta Center; Houston, TX
January 27, 2027; 6:00 p.m., ESPN+		Utah						McKale Center; Tucson, AZ
January 30, 2027; 2:00 p.m., ESPN+		at Arizona State						Desert Financial Arena; Tempe, AZ
February 6, 2027; 7:00 p.m., ESPN+		West Virginia						McKale Center; Tucson, AZ
February 10, 2027; 7:00 p.m., ESPN+		at BYU						Marriott Center; Provo, UT
February 13, 2027; 2:00 p.m., ESPN+		Baylor						McKale Center; Tucson, AZ
February 16, 2027; 6:00 p.m., ESPN+		Cincinnati						McKale Center; Tucson, AZ
February 20, 2027; 1:00 p.m., ESPN+		at Colorado						CU Events Center; Boulder, CO
February 24, 2027; 7:00 p.m., ESPN+		at Utah						Jon M. Huntsman Center; Salt Lake City, UT
February 28, 2027; 2:00 p.m., ESPN+		Arizona State						McKale Center; Tucson, AZ
Big 12 tournament
March 3–8, 2027; TBA		vs. TBD						T-Mobile Center; Kansas City, MO
*Non-conference game. ^{#}Rankings from AP Poll. (#) Tournament seedings in parentheses. All times are in Mountain.

== Rankings ==
Ranking movements
	Week																				
Poll	Pre	1	2	3	4	5	6	7	8	9	10	11	12	13	14	15	16	17	18	19	Final
AP																					
Coaches																					

== See also ==
- 2026–27 Arizona Wildcats men's basketball team
