= 2026–27 Texas Tech Lady Raiders basketball team =

Intercollegiate basketball season team

2026–27 Texas Tech Lady Raiders basketball
- Conference: Big 12 Conference
- Record: 4–1 (0–0 Big 12)
- Head coach: Krista Gerlich (7th season)
- Associate head coach: Adrian Walters; Erik DeRoo
- Assistant coaches: Jaida Williams; Ketara Chapel; Renae Boone
- Home arena: United Supermarkets Arena

2026–27 Big 12 women's basketball standings
	Conf.				Overall
Team	W		L	PCT	W		L	PCT
No. 15 TCU	0	–	0	–	7	–	0	1.000
BYU	0	–	0	–	6	–	0	1.000
Iowa State	0	–	0	–	6	–	0	1.000
Arizona State	0	–	0	–	5	–	0	1.000
Baylor	0	–	0	–	5	–	0	1.000
Colorado	0	–	0	–	5	–	0	1.000
Houston	0	–	0	–	5	–	0	1.000
Utah	0	–	0	–	5	–	0	1.000
No. 22 West Virginia	0	–	0	–	5	–	0	1.000
UCF	0	–	0	–	6	–	1	.857
Kansas State	0	–	0	–	5	–	1	.833
No. 25 Oklahoma State	0	–	0	–	5	–	1	.833
Arizona	0	–	0	–	4	–	1	.800
Cincinnati	0	–	0	–	4	–	1	.800
Texas Tech	0	–	0	–	4	–	1	.800
Kansas	0	–	0	–	3	–	2	.600
† 2027 Big 12 tournament winner As of November 20, 2026; Rankings from AP poll

The 2026–27 Texas Tech Lady Raiders basketball team currently represents Texas Tech University for the 2026–27 NCAA Division I women's basketball season. The Lady Raiders, led by seventh-year head coach Krista Gerlich, play their home games at the United Supermarkets Arena in Lubbock, Texas and compete as a member of the Big 12 Conference.

== Previous season ==
The Lady Raiders finished the 2025–26 season with their best record in over twenty years, going 26–8 overall and 12–6 in Big 12 play, to finish in a tie for fifth in the conference along with Oklahoma State. The team also earned their best start in program history, going 19–0, undefeated in non-conference play and winning their first six Big 12 games, before losing to Kansas State. On December 23, 2025, the Lady Raiders were ranked for the first time in the Associated Press poll since 2012, coming in at No. 21.

As the No. 5 seed in the Big 12 tournament, they were upset by No. 12 Kansas State 51–58 in the second round. The Lady Raiders led by as much as 14 points in the fourth, when Kansas State went on a 21–0 run for the comeback win.

Following the tournament elimination, the Lady Raiders earned an at-large bid to the NCAA tournament, making their first appearance since 2013. They were seeded No. 7 in the Sacramento #2 Regional, where they defeated No. 10 Villanova 57–52 in the first round before suffering a 47–101 loss to No. 2 LSU in the second round to end their season.

== Offseason ==
=== Departures ===
Texas Tech departures
Name	Number	Pos.	Height	Year	Hometown	Reason for departure
Snudda Collins	0	Guard	6'1"	Senior	Brookhaven, MS	Graduated
Gemma Núñez	2	Guard	5'7"	Senior	Almeria, Spain	Graduated
Julie Nekolná	3	Forward	6'3"	Junior	Prague, Czech Republic	Transferred to West Texas A&M (D-II)
Denae Fritz	5	Guard	5'11"	(redshirt) Senior	Maryville, TN	Exhausted eligibility
Kalysta "Bird" Martin	7	Guard	6'2"	Sophomore	San Antonio, TX	Transferred to North Texas
Adlee Blacklock	8	Guard	6'0"	Senior	Lubbock, TX	Graduated
Sidney Love	10	Guard	5'8"	Senior	San Antonio, TX	Graduated
Sarengbe Sanogo	11	Forward/Center	6'3"	Senior	Paris, France	Graduated
Mariam Sanogo	17	Forward/Guard	Senior	6'2"	Paris, France	Graduated
Bailey Maupin	20	Guard	5'10"	Senior	Gruver, TX	Graduated; went undrafted in the 2026 WNBA draft, signed a training camp contract with the Golden State Valkyries
Jada Malone	23	Forward	6'3"	(redshirt) Senior	Spring, TX	Exhausted eligibility

=== Incoming transfers ===
Texas Tech incoming transfers
Name	Number	Pos.	Height	Year	Hometown	Previous school
Destinee Hooks	3	Guard	5'9"	Senior	Indianapolis, IN	New Mexico
Mya Petticord	7	Guard	5'9"	5th Year	Detroit, MI	Auburn (Note: As part of an ongoing lawsuit challenging the new NCAA age-based eligibility model which excluded the class of 2022, Petticord was granted an additional year of eligibility from a temporary restraining order filed in Indiana.)
Jalayah Ingram	10	Guard	5'9"	Senior	Houston, TX	UTRGV
Kiki Smith	23	Guard	5'7"	Senior	Topeka, KS	Purdue
Tahys Da Silva	25	Guard	6'0"	Junior	Paris, France	Salt Lake City CC (NJCAA)
Rhema Collins	35	Forward	6'2"	Senior	Nassau, Bahamas	FIU

=== Recruiting class ===
College recruiting
Name	Hometown	School	Height	Weight	Commit date
Gianna Jordan; G	Dallas, TX	Kingdom Collegiate Academy	5 ft 7 in (1.70 m)	N/A	
Gianna Jordan; G	Recruit ratings: Rivals: ESPN: (93)				
Ambrosia Cole; G	Lubbock, TX	Monterey High School	5 ft 6 in (1.68 m)	N/A	
Ambrosia Cole; G	Recruit ratings: 247Sports: ESPN: (92)				
Overall recruit ranking:
Note: In many cases, Scout, Rivals, 247Sports, On3, and ESPN may conflict in their listings of height and weight.; In these cases, the average was taken. ESPN grades are on a 100-point scale.; Sources: "2026 Player Commits". ESPN. Archived from the original on August 6, 2026.

== Preseason ==
On October 8, 2026, the Big 12 Conference released its annual preseason coaches poll and awards. Texas Tech was picked to finish tenth in the conference.

=== Preseason rankings ===
Big 12 Preseason Coaches Poll
Place	Team	Votes
1	Oklahoma State	215 (1)
2	TCU	212 (6)
3	Baylor	199 (2)
4	West Virginia	186 (1)
5	Kansas	160
6	Arizona State	143
7	BYU	137
8	Colorado	126
9	Kansas State	121
10	Texas Tech	103
11	Iowa State	78
12	Utah	77
13	Arizona	55
14	Cincinnati	43
15	Houston	38
16	UCF	27
(#) first-place votes

=== Preseason All-Big 12 Team ===
No players were named to the Preseason All-Big 12 Team.

== Roster ==
Years are listed according to the new NCAA age-based eligibility model.

2026–27 Texas Tech Lady Raiders women's basketball team
Players
Coaches

Pos.	#	Name	Height	Year	Previous school	Hometown
G	0	Milania Jordan	5 ft 10 in (1.78 m)	Fr	Kingdom Collegiate Academy	Dallas, TX
G/F	1	Jalynn Bristow	6 ft 2 in (1.88 m)	Sr	Holliday High School; Iowa State	Holliday, TX
G	2	Gianna Jordan	5 ft 7 in (1.7 m)	Fr	Kingdom Collegiate Academy	Dallas, TX
G	3	Destinee Hooks	5 ft 9 in (1.75 m)	Sr	North Central High School; New Mexico	Indianapolis, IN
G	4	Natalia Jordan	5 ft 8 in (1.73 m)	Fr	Kingdom Collegiate Academy	Dallas, TX
C	5	Jayda Kearney	6 ft 5 in (1.96 m)	Fr	Caney Creek High School	Caldwell, TX
G	7	Mya Petticord (5th)	5 ft 9 in (1.75 m)	Sr	Arbor Prep; Auburn	Detroit, MI
F	8	Martina Anyango	6 ft 4 in (1.93 m)	So	Uganda Christian University	Kampala, Uganda
G	10	Jalayah Ingram	5 ft 9 in (1.75 m)	Sr	Houston Christian High School; UTRGV	Houston, TX
G	11	Ambrosia Cole	5 ft 7 in (1.7 m)	Fr	Monterey High School	Lubbock, TX
F	12	Moriyah Douglass	6 ft 4 in (1.93 m)	Fr	John Burroughs School	St. Louis, MO
G	23	Kiki Smith	5 ft 7 in (1.7 m)	Sr	Topeka High School; Purdue	Topeka, KS
F	24	Stephanie Okechukwu	7 ft 1 in (2.16 m)	So	Fukuchiyama Seibi	Umunneochi, Nigeria
G	25	Tahys Da Silva	6 ft 0 in (1.83 m)	Jr	Lycée De L'elorn; Salt Lake City Community College	Paris, France
F	35	Rhema Collins	6 ft 2 in (1.88 m)	Sr	The Weber School; FIU	Nassau, Bahamas

Head coach

- Krista Gerlich (Texas Tech)

Assistant coach(es)

- Adrian Walters (Saint Francis (PA))
- Erik Deroo (Fresno State)
- Jaida Williams (Cal Poly Pomona)
- Ketara Chapel (Mississippi State)
- Renae Boone (Central Missouri)

Legend

- (C) Team captain
- (S) Suspended
- (I) Ineligible
- (W) Walk-on
- (5th) Fifth year senior
- Injured
- Current redshirt

Roster
Last update: October 19, 2026

== Schedule and results ==
Date time, TV	Rank^{#}	Opponent^{#}	Result	Record	High points	High rebounds	High assists	Site (attendance) city, state
Exhibition
October 18, 2026*; 1:00 p.m.		Angelo State	W 81–40		26 – Bristow	9 – Bristow	6 – Cole	United Supermarkets Arena; Lubbock, TX
Non-conference regular season
November 5, 2026*; 5:00 p.m., ESPN+		Charlotte	W 64–37	1–0	16 – Hooks	10 – Okechukwu	2 – Hooks	United Supermarkets Arena (4,776); Lubbock, TX
November 9, 2026*; 6:00 p.m., ESPN+		Lamar	W 78–28	2–0	21 – Okechukwu	11 – Cole	5 – Bristow	United Supermarkets Arena (3,638); Lubbock, TX
November 13, 2026*; 6:00 p.m., ESPN+		Auburn	W 73–71	3–0	13 – Bristow	10 – Bristow	5 – Coke	United Supermarkets Arena (4,740); Lubbock, TX
November 15, 2026*; 2:00 p.m., ESPN+		Southeastern Louisiana	W 85–51	4–0	28 – Okechukwu	13 – Okechukwu	5 – Cole	United Supermarkets Arena (4,387); Lubbock, TX
November 19, 2026*; 5:00 p.m., ESPN2		vs. No. 24 North Carolina; WBCA Showcase	L 47–61	4–1	15 – Cole	9 – Tied	4 – Cole	State Farm Field House; Orlando, FL
November 21, 2026*; 1:30 p.m., ESPN+		vs. Purdue; WBCA Showcase						State Farm Field House; Orlando, FL
November 22, 2026*; 12:00 p.m., ESPN+		vs. Florida State; WBCA Showcase						State Farm Field House; Orlando, FL
November 26, 2026*; 4:30 p.m., ESPN+		vs. Air Force; Paradise Jam Island Division semifinal						UVI Sports and Fitness Center; St. Thomas, USVI
November 28, 2026*; 11:30 a.m./ 2:00 p.m., ESPN+		vs. Xavier or Santa Clara; Paradise Jam Island Division						UVI Sports and Fitness Center; St. Thomas, USVI
December 1, 2026*; 6:00 p.m., ESPN+		Texas Southern						United Supermarkets Arena; Lubbock, TX
December 13, 2026*; 2:00 p.m., SECN+/ESPN+		at Mississippi State						Humphrey Coliseum; Starkville, MS
December 16, 2026*; 11:30 a.m., ESPN+		North Florida						United Supermarkets Arena; Lubbock, TX
Big 12 regular season
December 20, 2026; 1:00 p.m., ESPN+		Colorado						United Supermarkets Arena; Lubbock, TX
December 30, 2026; 6:00 p.m., ESPN+		at Baylor						Foster Pavilion; Waco, TX
January 2, 2027; 6:00 p.m., ESPN+		at TCU						Schollmaier Arena; Fort Worth, TX
January 5, 2027; 6:00 p.m., ESPN+		Cincinnati						United Supermarkets Arena; Lubbock, TX
January 9, 2027; 2:00 p.m., ESPN+		Utah						United Supermarkets Arena; Lubbock, TX
January 13, 2027; 7:00 p.m., ESPN+		at Arizona						McKale Center; Tucson, AZ
January 16, 2027; 3:00 p.m., ESPN+		at Arizona State						Desert Financial Arena; Tempe, AZ
January 20, 2027; 6:00 p.m., ESPN+		Baylor						United Supermarkets Arena; Lubbock, TX
January 23, 2027; 5:00 p.m., ESPN+		at UCF						Addition Financial Arena; Orlando, FL
January 27, 2027; 6:00 p.m., ESPN+		West Virginia						United Supermarkets Arena; Lubbock, TX
January 30, 2027; 7:30 p.m., ESPN+		BYU						United Supermarkets Arena; Lubbock, TX
February 3, 2027; 6:30 p.m., ESPN+		at Iowa State						Hilton Coliseum; Ames, IA
February 7, 2027; 1:00 p.m., ESPN+		at Kansas State						Bramlage Coliseum; Manhattan, KS
February 13, 2027; 12:30 p.m., ESPN+		UCF						United Supermarkets Arena; Lubbock, TX
February 17, 2027; 6:00 p.m., ESPN+		Houston						United Supermarkets Arena; Lubbock, TX
February 20, 2027; 1:00 p.m., ESPN+		at West Virginia						Hope Coliseum; Morgantown, WV
February 24, 2027; 5:30 p.m., CBSSN		Oklahoma State						United Supermarkets Arena; Lubbock, TX
February 28, 2027; 2:00 p.m., ESPN+		at Kansas						Allen Fieldhouse; Lawrence, KS
Big 12 tournament
March 3–8, 2027; TBA		vs.						T-Mobile Center; Kansas City, MO
*Non-conference game. ^{#}Rankings from AP Poll. (#) Tournament seedings in parentheses. All times are in Central.

== Rankings ==
Ranking movements Legend: — = Not ranked RV = Received votes
	Week																				
Poll	Pre	1	2	3	4	5	6	7	8	9	10	11	12	13	14	15	16	17	18	19	Final
AP	—																				
Coaches	RV																				
