= 2026–27 Arizona State Sun Devils women's basketball team =

American college basketball season

2026–27 Arizona State Sun Devils women's basketball
- Conference: Big 12 Conference
- Record: 3–0 (0–0 Big 12)
- Head coach: Molly Miller (2nd season)
- Associate head coach: Stephanie Norman; Jason Glover; Daniel Barber
- Assistant coach: Daejah Bernard
- Home arena: Desert Financial Arena

2026–27 Big 12 women's basketball standings
	Conf.				Overall
Team	W		L	PCT	W		L	PCT
No. 15 TCU	0	–	0	–	6	–	0	1.000
Baylor	0	–	0	–	5	–	0	1.000
BYU	0	–	0	–	5	–	0	1.000
Iowa State	0	–	0	–	5	–	0	1.000
Colorado	0	–	0	–	4	–	0	1.000
Houston	0	–	0	–	4	–	0	1.000
Texas Tech	0	–	0	–	4	–	0	1.000
Utah	0	–	0	–	4	–	0	1.000
No. 22 West Virginia	0	–	0	–	4	–	0	1.000
Arizona State	0	–	0	–	3	–	0	1.000
Kansas State	0	–	0	–	4	–	1	.800
No. 25 Oklahoma State	0	–	0	–	4	–	1	.800
UCF	0	–	0	–	4	–	1	.800
Arizona	0	–	0	–	3	–	1	.750
Cincinnati	0	–	0	–	3	–	1	.750
Kansas	0	–	0	–	3	–	1	.750
† 2027 Big 12 tournament winner As of November 16, 2026; Rankings from AP poll

The 2026–27 Arizona State women's basketball team currently represents Arizona State University during the 2026–27 NCAA Division I women's basketball season. The Sun Devils, led by second-year head coach Molly Miller, play their home games at the Desert Financial Arena in Tempe, Arizona and compete as second year members of the Big 12 Conference.

== Previous season ==
The Sun Devils finished the 2025–26 season 24–11 overall and 9–9 in Big 12 play, to finish in a tie for ninth in the conference with BYU. As the No. 10 seed in the Big 12 tournament, they narrowly defeated rivals No. 15 Arizona 57–54 in the first round and beat No. 7 Iowa State in the second round, before falling to eventual tournament winners No. 2 West Virginia in the quarterfinals.

Following their tournament elimination, the Sun Devils earned an automatic bid to the NCAA tournament, their first since 2019, where they were placed into the First Four. They could not advance to the field of 64 as they lost 55–57 to the other No. 10 seed in Virginia to end their season.

The Sun Devils under head coach Molly Miller had their best turnaround in program history, going from 10–22 in the 2024–25 season to their first winning season in six years.

== Offseason ==
=== Departures ===
Arizona State Departures
Name	Num	Pos.	Height	Year	Hometown	Reason for Departure
Gabby Elliot	0	Guard	5'10"	Graduate Student	Detroit, Michigan	Graduated
Jyah LoVett	4	Guard	5'8"	Junior	San Gabriel, California	Transferred to Toledo
Acacia Hayes	10	Guard	5'7"	Senior	Murfreesboro, Tennessee	Transferred to Utah State (Note: Did not play in the 2025–26 season due to injury.)
Marley Washenitz	11	Guard	5'7"	Senior	Fairmont, West Virginia	Graduated
Makayla Moore	12	Guard	6'0"	Senior	San Jose, California	Graduated
Last-Tear Poa	13	Guard	5'11"	Fifth Year	Melbourne, Australia	Exhaused eligibility
Timya Grace	22	Center	6'5"	(redshirt) Freshman	Katy, Texas	Transferred to Temple
Jordan Jones	23	Guard	6'0"	Senior	Sylmar, California	Transferred to Florida

=== Incoming transfers ===
Arizona State incoming transfers
Name	Num	Pos.	Height	Year	Hometown	Previous School
Madison Morson	0	Guard	5'8"	Junior	Canton, Michigan	Central Michigan
Ruby Whitehorn	2	Guard	6'0"	Senior	Detroit, Michigan	Tennessee
Rashunda Jones	4	Guard	5'8"	Senior	South Bend, Indiana	Michigan State
Ella Ryan	22	Guard	5'8"	Sophomore	Brentwood, Tennessee	Quinnipiac
Ayanna-Sarai Darrington	25	Forward	6'2"	Junior	Lexington, Kentucky	Central Michigan

=== Recruiting class ===
College recruiting
Name	Hometown	School	Height	Weight	Commit date
Averie Lower; G	North Liberty, Iowa	Clear Creek-Amana High School	5 ft 11 in (1.80 m)	N/A	
Averie Lower; G	Recruit ratings: ESPN: (95)				
Londyn Parker; G	Kansas City, Missouri	Staley High School	5 ft 9 in (1.75 m)	N/A	
Londyn Parker; G	Recruit ratings: 247Sports: ESPN: (91)				
Overall recruit ranking: ESPN: 25
Note: In many cases, Scout, Rivals, 247Sports, On3, and ESPN may conflict in their listings of height and weight.; In these cases, the average was taken. ESPN grades are on a 100-point scale.; Sources: "2026 Player Commits". ESPN. Archived from the original on August 5, 2026.

== Preseason ==
On October 8, 2026, the Big 12 Conference released its annual preseason coaches poll and awards. Arizona State was picked to finish sixth in the conference.

=== Preseason rankings ===
Big 12 Preseason Coaches Poll
Place	Team	Votes
1	Oklahoma State	215 (1)
2	TCU	212 (6)
3	Baylor	199 (2)
4	West Virginia	186 (1)
5	Kansas	160
6	Arizona State	143
7	BYU	137
8	Colorado	126
9	Kansas State	121
10	Texas Tech	103
11	Iowa State	78
12	Utah	77
13	Arizona	55
14	Cincinnati	43
15	Houston	38
16	UCF	27
(#) first-place votes

=== Preseason All-Big 12 Team ===
Preseason All-Big 12 Team
Player	Year	Position
McKinna Brackens	Junior	Forward
^{#} unanimous selection

== Roster ==
2026–27 Arizona State Sun Devils women's basketball team
Players
Coaches

Pos.	#	Name	Height	Year	Previous school	Hometown
G	0	Madison Morson	5 ft 8 in (1.73 m)	Fr	Salem High School; Central Michigan	Canton, MI
G	1	Amaya Williams	5 ft 8 in (1.73 m)	So	Mater Dei High School	Mission Viejo, CA
G	2	Ruby Whitehorn	6 ft 0 in (1.83 m)	Sr	Detroit Edison Public Academy; Tennessee	Detroit, MI
G	4	Rashunda Jones	5 ft 8 in (1.73 m)	Sr	Washington High School; Michigan State	South Bend, IN
G	5	Quin'nya Gray de Sanders	5 ft 8 in (1.73 m)	Fr	Winter Haven High School	Winter Haven, FL
C	7	Martina Fantini	6 ft 3 in (1.91 m)	So	U20 Italian National Team	Florence, Italy
G	8	Londyn Parker	5 ft 9 in (1.75 m)	Fr	Staley High School	Kansas City, MO
G	10	Averie Lower	6 ft 0 in (1.83 m)	Fr	Clear Creek-Amana High School	North Liberty, IA
F	14	Heloisa Carrera	6 ft 2 in (1.88 m)	Jr	IMG Academy; Ole Miss	São Paulo, Brazil
F	21	McKinna Brackens	6 ft 1 in (1.85 m)	Jr	Fairfield High School; UNLV	Fairfield, TX
G	22	Ella Ryan	5 ft 8 in (1.73 m)	So	Brentwood High School; Quinnipiac	Brentwood, TN
G/F	24	Deborah Davenport	6 ft 2 in (1.88 m)	RS Sr	Woodward High School; Northwest Florida State College	Cincinnati, OH
F	25	Ayanna-Sarai Darrington	6 ft 2 in (1.88 m)	Jr	Frederick Douglass High School; Central Michigan	Lexington, KY

Head coach

- Molly Miller (Drury)

Assistant coach(es)

- Stephanie Norman (Arizona State)
- Jason Glover (Grand Canyon)
- Daniel Barber (Florida)
- Abi Olajuwon (Oklahoma)
- Daejah Bernard (Drury)

Legend

- (C) Team captain
- (S) Suspended
- (I) Ineligible
- (W) Walk-on
- Injured
- Current redshirt

Roster
Last update: August 5, 2026

== Schedule and results ==
Date time, TV	Rank^{#}	Opponent^{#}	Result	Record	High points	High rebounds	High assists	Site (attendance) city, state
Non-conference regular season
November 2, 2026*; 5:00 p.m., ESPN+		Jackson State	W 84-41	1-0	15 – Tied	9 – Carrera	6 – Tied	Desert Financial Arena (2,015); Tempe, AZ
November 5, 2026*; 6:30 p.m., ESPN+		Northern Arizona	W 79-52	2-0	25 – Whitehorn	10 – Whitehorn	6 – Jones	Desert Financial Arena (2,179); Tempe, AZ
November 10, 2026*; 7:30 p.m., MW+		at UNLV	W 65-58	3-0	17 – Morson	10 – Whitehorn	7 – Jones	Cox Pavilion (1,510); Paradise, NV
November 16, 2026*; 2:00 p.m., ESPN+		Penn State						Desert Financial Arena; Tempe, AZ
November 17, 2026*; 6:30 p.m., ESPN+		San Diego						Desert Financial Arena; Tempe, AZ
November 20, 2026*; 6:30 p.m., ESPN+		Santa Clara						Mullett Arena; Tempe, AZ
November 24, 2026*; 6:30 p.m., ESPN+		San Jose State						Desert Financial Arena; Tempe, AZ
November 28, 2026*; 2:30 p.m., ESPN+		Cal State Bakersfield; Briann January Classic						Desert Financial Arena; Tempe, AZ
November 29, 2026*; 12:30 p.m., ESPN+		Wake Forest; Briann January Classic						Desert Financial Arena; Tempe, AZ
December 6, 2026*; 2:00 p.m., ESPN+		Gonzaga						Mullett Arena; Tempe, AZ
December 8, 2026*; 5:00 p.m., ESPN+		UT Rio Grande Valley						Desert Financial Arena; Tempe, AZ
December 12, 2026*; 4:30 p.m.		vs. Washington State; San Diego MTE						Jenny Craig Pavilion; San Diego, CA
December 13, 2026*; 4:30 p.m.		vs. Colorado State; San Diego MTE						Jenny Craig Pavilion; San Diego, CA
December 17, 2026; 8:00 p.m., ACCNX/ESPN+		at Stanford						Maples Pavilion; Stanford, CA
Big 12 regular season
December 21, 2026; 1:00 p.m., ESPN+		Utah						Desert Financial Arena; Tempe, AZ
December 30, 2026; 6:00 p.m., ESPN+		at Colorado						CU Events Center; Boulder, CO
January 2, 2027; 11:00 a.m., ESPN+		at UCF						Addition Financial Arena; Orlando, FL
January 6, 2027; 6:30 p.m., ESPN+		Iowa State						Desert Financial Arena; Tempe, AZ
January 9, 2027; 4:00 p.m., ESPN+		at BYU						Marriott Center; Provo, UT
January 16, 2027; 2:00 p.m., ESPN+		Texas Tech						Desert Financial Arena; Tempe, AZ
January 20, 2027; 5:00 p.m., CBSSN		TCU						Desert Financial Arena; Tempe, AZ
January 24, 2027; 12:00 p.m., ESPN+		at Kansas State						Bramlage Coliseum; Manhattan, KS
January 27, 2027; 5:30 p.m., ESPN+		at Kansas						Allen Fieldhouse; Lawrence, KS
January 30, 2027; 2:00 p.m., ESPN+		Arizona						Desert Financial Arena; Tempe, AZ
February 3, 2027; 8:00 p.m., ESPNU		West Virginia						Desert Financial Arena; Tempe, AZ
February 7, 2027; 4:00 p.m., ESPN		at Oklahoma State						Gallagher-Iba Arena; Stillwater, OK
February 10, 2027; 6:00 p.m., ESPN+		at Houston						Fertitta Center; Houston, TX
February 13, 2027; 12:30 p.m., ESPN+		Cincinnati						Desert Financial Arena; Tempe, AZ
February 16, 2027; 8:00 p.m., FS1		Baylor						Desert Financial Arena; Tempe, AZ
February 21, 2027; 2:00 p.m., ESPN+		at Utah						Jon M. Huntsman Center; Salt Lake City, UT
February 24, 2027; 6:30 p.m., ESPN+		Colorado						Desert Financial Arena; Tempe, AZ
February 28, 2027; 2:00 p.m., ESPN+		at Arizona						McKale Center; Tucson, AZ
Big 12 tournament
March 3–8, 2027; TBA		vs.						T-Mobile Center; Kansas City, MO
*Non-conference game. ^{#}Rankings from AP Poll. (#) Tournament seedings in parentheses. All times are in Mountain.

== Rankings ==
Ranking movements Legend: RV = Received votes
	Week																				
Poll	Pre	1	2	3	4	5	6	7	8	9	10	11	12	13	14	15	16	17	18	19	Final
AP	RV																				
Coaches	RV																				
