= 2026–27 Houston Cougars women's basketball team =

2026–27 Houston Cougars women's basketball
- Conference: Big 12 Conference
- Record: 5–0 (0–0 Big 12)
- Head coach: Matthew Mitchell (2nd season)
- Associate head coach: Damitria Buchanan
- Assistant coaches: DeNesha Stallworth; Marqu'es Webb; Dominique Dillingham
- Home arena: Fertitta Center

2026–27 Big 12 women's basketball standings
	Conf.				Overall
Team	W		L	PCT	W		L	PCT
No. 15 TCU	0	–	0	–	7	–	0	1.000
BYU	0	–	0	–	6	–	0	1.000
Iowa State	0	–	0	–	6	–	0	1.000
Arizona State	0	–	0	–	5	–	0	1.000
Baylor	0	–	0	–	5	–	0	1.000
Colorado	0	–	0	–	5	–	0	1.000
Houston	0	–	0	–	5	–	0	1.000
Utah	0	–	0	–	5	–	0	1.000
No. 22 West Virginia	0	–	0	–	5	–	0	1.000
UCF	0	–	0	–	6	–	1	.857
Kansas State	0	–	0	–	5	–	1	.833
No. 25 Oklahoma State	0	–	0	–	5	–	1	.833
Arizona	0	–	0	–	4	–	1	.800
Cincinnati	0	–	0	–	4	–	1	.800
Texas Tech	0	–	0	–	4	–	1	.800
Kansas	0	–	0	–	3	–	2	.600
† 2027 Big 12 tournament winner As of November 20, 2026; Rankings from AP poll

The 2026–27 Houston Cougars women's basketball team currently represents the University of Houston during the 2026–27 NCAA Division I women's basketball season. The Cougars, led by second-year head coach Matthew Mitchell, play their home games at the Fertitta Center and compete as a member of the Big 12 Conference.

== Previous season ==
The Cougars finished the 2025–26 season 7–23 overall and 1–17 in Big 12 play, to finish last in the conference for the second straight season. Their only conference win came on February 1, when the Cougars defeated Cincinnati 72–70 with a game-winning three pointer at the buzzer from guard Kyndall Hunter. As the No. 16 seed in the Big 12 tournament, they lost 66–76 to No. 9 BYU in the first round to end their season.

== Offseason ==
=== Departures ===
Houston departures
Name	Number	Pos.	Height	Year	Hometown	Reason for departure
TK Pitts	0	Guard	6'1"	Senior	Tulsa, OK	Graduated
Brianna Peguero	1	Guard	5'7"	Graduate Student	Houston, TX	Graduated
Kierra Merchant	2	Guard	5'9"	Junior	Houston, TX	Transferred to UTSA
Kateri Poole	5	Guard	5'8"	Graduate Student	The Bronx, NY	Transferred to Arkansas
Kyndall Hunter	7	Guard	5'7"	Senior	Houston, TX	Transferred to Purdue
Summer Bostock	8	Guard	6'1"	Junior	Toronto, ON	Transferred to Northeastern
Amari Bartlett	12	Forward	6'3"	Graduate Student	Cleveland, TX	Graduated
Jade Jones	14	Forward	5'10"	Freshman	Palm Beach, FL	Transferred to Cincinnati
Amirah Abdur-Rahim	23	Forward	6'3"	Graduate Student	Marietta, GA	Graduated
Shun'teria Anumele	24	Guard	5'8"	Sophomore	Houston, TX	Transferred to Alabama A&M

=== Incoming transfers ===
Houston incoming transfers
Name	Number	Pos.	Height	Year	Hometown	Previous school
Esmeralda Enriquez	0	Guard	5'8"	Junior	Yakima, WA	Eastern Arizona College (NJCAA)
Justice Carlton	11	Forward	6'1"	Junior	Katy, TX	Texas
Kaelyn Hamilton	12	Guard	5'9"	Junior	McKinney, TX	San Diego State
Raegan McCowan	21	Guard	6'0"	Senior	Lebanon, MO	Western Illinois
Janiyah Williams	22	Guard	5'9"	Sophomore	Edmond, OK	Oregon
Elodie Lutbert	27	Center	6'6"	Sophomore	Sainte-Luce, Martinique	Tarleton State

=== Recruiting class ===
College recruiting
Name	Hometown	School	Height	Weight	Commit date
Madison Carlton; F	Katy, TX	Seven Lakes High School	6 ft 1 in (1.85 m)	N/A	
Madison Carlton; F	Recruit ratings: ESPN: (91)				
Overall recruit ranking:
Note: In many cases, Scout, Rivals, 247Sports, On3, and ESPN may conflict in their listings of height and weight.; In these cases, the average was taken. ESPN grades are on a 100-point scale.; Sources: "2026 Player Commits". ESPN. Archived from the original on September 18, 2026.

== Preseason ==
On October 8, 2026, the Big 12 Conference released its annual preseason coaches poll and awards. Houston was picked to finish fifteenth in the conference.

=== Preseason rankings ===
Big 12 Preseason Coaches Poll
Place	Team	Votes
1	Oklahoma State	215 (1)
2	TCU	212 (6)
3	Baylor	199 (2)
4	West Virginia	186 (1)
5	Kansas	160
6	Arizona State	143
7	BYU	137
8	Colorado	126
9	Kansas State	121
10	Texas Tech	103
11	Iowa State	78
12	Utah	77
13	Arizona	55
14	Cincinnati	43
15	Houston	38
16	UCF	27
(#) first-place votes

=== Preseason All-Big 12 Team ===
No players were named to the Preseason All-Big 12 Team.

== Roster ==
2026–27 Houston Cougars women's basketball team
Players
Coaches

Pos.	#	Name	Height	Year	Previous school	Hometown
G	0	Esmeralda Enriquez	5 ft 8 in (1.73 m)	Jr	A.C. Davis High School; Eastern Arizona College	Yakima, WA
G	2	Alyvia McCorkle	5 ft 7 in (1.7 m)	Fr	Bettendorf High School	Bettendorf, IA
F	4	Madison Carlton	6 ft 1 in (1.85 m)	Fr	Seven Lakes High School	Katy, TX
G	5	Kayla King	5 ft 10 in (1.78 m)	So	Judson High School	San Antonio, TX
F	7	Jemma Hunter	6 ft 5 in (1.96 m)	RS Fr	Euroa Secondary College	Gold Coast, Australia
F	11	Justice Carlton (injured)	6 ft 1 in (1.85 m)	Jr	Seven Lakes High School; Texas	Katy, TX
G	12	Kaelyn Hamilton	5 ft 9 in (1.75 m)	Jr	McKinney North High School; San Diego State	McKinney, TX
G	14	Maria Llompart	5 ft 8 in (1.73 m)	Fr		Mallorca, Spain
F	15	Tamia King	6 ft 1 in (1.85 m)	Fr	Westlake High School	Austin, TX
G	21	Raegan McCowan	6 ft 0 in (1.83 m)	Sr	Lebanon High School; Western Illinois	Lebanon, MO
G	22	Janiyah Williams	5 ft 9 in (1.75 m)	So	Edmond Memorial High School; Oregon	Edmond, OK
F	26	Jorynn Ross	6 ft 3 in (1.91 m)	Sr	Summer Creek; Arizona	Milwaukee, WI
C	27	Elodie Luthbert	6 ft 6 in (1.98 m)	So	ESB Villeneuve-d'Ascq; Tarleton	Sainte-Luce, Martinique

Head coach

- Matthew Mitchell (Mississippi State)

Assistant coach(es)

- Damitria Buchanan (Texas A&M)
- DeNesha Stallworth (Kentucky)
- Marqu'es Webb (Vanderbilt)
- Dominique Dillingham (Mississippi State)

Legend

- (C) Team captain
- (S) Suspended
- (I) Ineligible
- (W) Walk-on
- Injured
- Current redshirt

Roster
Last update: September 18, 2026

== Schedule and results ==
Date time, TV	Rank^{#}	Opponent^{#}	Result	Record	High points	High rebounds	High assists	Site (attendance) city, state
Exhibition
October 28, 2026*; 6:30 p.m., ESPN+		Eastern New Mexico	W 91–32		18 – Hamilton	10 – Lutbert	8 – Llompart	Fertitta Center; Houston, TX
Non-conference regular season
November 2, 2026*; 12:00 p.m., ESPN+		Hampton	W 73–65	1–0	20 – Enriquez	13 – Lutbert	6 – Llompart	Fertitta Center; Houston, TX
November 5, 2026*; 7:00 p.m., ESPN+		Sam Houston	W 78–50	2–0	18 – Enriquez	10 – McCowan	8 – Llompart	Fertitta Center (1,009); Houston, TX
November 10, 2026*; 7:00 p.m., ESPN+		Stephen F. Austin	W 89–59	3–0	27 – McCowan	10 – McCowan	5 – Llompart	Fertitta Center (835); Houston, TX
November 13, 2026*; 8:00 p.m.		at Montana	W 81–73	4–0	35 – Enriquez	9 – Enriquez	8 – Llompart	Dahlberg Arena (2,083); Missoula, MT
November 17, 2026*; 7:00 p.m., ESPN+		Texas A&M–Corpus Christi	W 70–57	5–0	24 – Tied	10 – Tied	5 – Lutbert	Fertitta Center (751); Houston, TX
November 21, 2026*; 1:00 p.m., ESPN+		Houston Christian						Fertitta Center; Houston, TX
November 23, 2026*; 7:00 p.m., ESPN+		Prairie View A&M						Fertitta Center; Houston, TX
November 27, 2026*; 3:30 p.m., BDG Live		vs. Creighton; Coconut Hoops Great Egert Division semifnals						Alico Arena; Fort Myers, FL
November 29, 2026*; 3:00 p.m./5:30 p.m., BDG Live		vs. Tennessee/Florida Gulf Coast; Coconut Hoops Great Egert Division						Alico Arena; Fort Myers, FL
December 3, 2026*; 11:00 a.m., ESPN+		Texas Southern						Fertitta Center; Houston, TX
December 7, 2026*; 7:00 p.m., ESPN+		Montana State						Fertitta Center; Houston, TX
December 11, 2026*; 11:15 a.m., ESPN+		at Rice; Rivalry						Tudor Fieldhouse; Houston, TX
December 13, 2026*; 12:00 p.m., ESPN		vs. LSU; Houston Hoopfest						Toyota Center; Houston, TX
Big 12 regular season
December 21, 2026; 7:00 p.m., ESPN+		Baylor						Fertitta Center; Houston, TX
December 30, 2027; 8:00 p.m., ESPN+		at Utah						Jon M. Huntsman Center; Salt Lake City, UT
January 2, 2027; 3:00 p.m., ESPN+		at BYU						Marriott Center; Provo, UT
January 6, 2027; 7:00 p.m., ESPN+		West Virginia						Fertitta Center; Houston, TX
January 9, 2027; 1:00 p.m., ESPN+		at Cincinnati						Fifth Third Arena; Cincinnati, OH
January 16, 2027; 1:00 p.m., ESPN+		UCF						Fertitta Center; Houston, TX
January 20, 2027; 6:30 p.m., ESPN+		at Kansas State						Bramlage Coliseum; Manhattan, KS
January 23, 2027; 1:00 p.m., ESPN+		Arizona						Fertitta Center; Houston, TX
January 27, 2027; 6:30 p.m., ESPN+		at Iowa State						Hilton Coliseum; Ames, IA
January 31, 2027; 2:00 p.m., ESPN+		Oklahoma State						Fertitta Center; Houston, TX
February 3, 2027; 7:00 p.m., ESPN+		at Colorado						CU Events Center; Boulder, CO
February 7, 2027; 2:00 p.m., ESPN+		at TCU						Schollmaier Arena; Fort Worth, TX
February 10, 2027; 7:00 p.m., ESPN+		Arizona State						Fertitta Center; Houston, TX
February 13, 2027; 7:30 p.m., ESPN+		Kansas						Fertitta Center; Houston, TX
February 17, 2027; 6:00 p.m., ESPN+		at Texas Tech						United Supermarkets Arena; Lubbock, TX
February 20, 2027; 1:00 p.m., ESPN+		TCU						Fertitta Center; Houston, TX
February 23, 2027; 7:00 p.m., ESPN+		Cincinnati						Fertitta Center; Houston, TX
February 27, 2027; 3:00 p.m., ESPN+		at UCF						Addition Financial Arena; Orlando, FL
Big 12 tournament
March 3–8, 2027; TBA		vs.						T-Mobile Center; Kansas City, MO
*Non-conference game. ^{#}Rankings from AP Poll. (#) Tournament seedings in parentheses. All times are in Central.
