= 2026–27 Kansas State Wildcats women's basketball team =

Collegiate basketball team season

2026–27 Kansas State Wildcats women's basketball
- Conference: Big 12 Conference
- Record: 4–1 (0–0 Big 12)
- Head coach: Jeff Mittie (13th season)
- Associate head coach: Ebony Gilliam
- Assistant coaches: Ebony Haliburton; Dylan Geisert; Madison Pahls
- Home arena: Bramlage Coliseum

2026–27 Big 12 women's basketball standings
	Conf.				Overall
Team	W		L	PCT	W		L	PCT
No. 15 TCU	0	–	0	–	6	–	0	1.000
Baylor	0	–	0	–	5	–	0	1.000
BYU	0	–	0	–	5	–	0	1.000
Iowa State	0	–	0	–	5	–	0	1.000
Utah	0	–	0	–	5	–	0	1.000
Arizona State	0	–	0	–	4	–	0	1.000
Colorado	0	–	0	–	4	–	0	1.000
Houston	0	–	0	–	4	–	0	1.000
Texas Tech	0	–	0	–	4	–	0	1.000
No. 22 West Virginia	0	–	0	–	4	–	0	1.000
Kansas State	0	–	0	–	4	–	1	.800
No. 25 Oklahoma State	0	–	0	–	4	–	1	.800
UCF	0	–	0	–	4	–	1	.800
Arizona	0	–	0	–	3	–	1	.750
Cincinnati	0	–	0	–	3	–	1	.750
Kansas	0	–	0	–	3	–	1	.750
† 2027 Big 12 tournament winner As of November 18, 2026; Rankings from AP poll

The 2026–27 Kansas State Wildcats women's basketball team currently represents Kansas State University in the 2026–27 NCAA Division I women's basketball season. The Wildcats, led by 13th-year head coach Jeff Mittie, play their home games at the Bramlage Coliseum in Manhattan, Kansas as a member of the Big 12 Conference.

== Previous season ==
The Wildcats finished the 2025–26 season 19–18 overall and 8–10 in Big 12 play, to finish in a tie for eleventh in the conference along with rival Kansas. As the No. 12 seed in the Big 12 tournament, they defeated No. 13 Cincinnati in the first round, upset No. 5 Texas Tech 58–51 and No. 4 Oklahoma State 74–73 in the second round and quarterfinals respectively, before losing 62–74 to top-seeded TCU in the semifinals. They became the lowest seed to make it to the semifinals in tournament history.

Following their unprecedented tournament run and eventual elimination, the Wildcats earned an at-large bid to the WBIT, where they were seeded No. 2 in the North Dakota State Bracket. They narrowly defeated unseeded Georgia Tech 69–65 in the first round, before falling to No. 3 California in the second round to end their season.

== Offseason ==
=== Departures ===
Kansas State Departures
Name	Number	Pos.	Height	Year	Hometown	Reason for Departure
Izela Arenas	0	Guard	5'8"	Sophomore	Los Angeles, CA	Transferred to SMU
Aniya' Foy	5	Guard	5'11"	Freshman	Katy, TX	Transferred to Colorado
Jordan Speiser	23	Guard	6'1"	Freshman	Warrenton, MO	Transferred to Oklahoma
Jenessa Cotton	24	Forward	6'1"	Sophomore	Orange, CA	Transferred to Sacramento State
Tess Heal	34	Guard	5'10"	Senior	Melbourne, Australia	Graduated
Alexis Hess	35	Forward	6'1"	(redshirt) Freshman	Blandon, PA	Transferred to Sacramento State

=== Incoming transfers ===
Kansas State incoming transfers
Name	Number	Pos.	Height	Year	Hometown	Previous School
Téa Cléante	25	Guard	5'9"	Sophomore	Dunkirk, France	Penn State

=== Recruiting class ===
There was no 2026 recruiting class.

== Preseason ==
On October 8, 2026, the Big 12 Conference released its annual preseason coaches poll and awards. Kansas State was picked to finish ninth in the conference.

=== Preseason rankings ===
Big 12 Preseason Coaches Poll
Place	Team	Votes
1	Oklahoma State	215 (1)
2	TCU	212 (6)
3	Baylor	199 (2)
4	West Virginia	186 (1)
5	Kansas	160
6	Arizona State	143
7	BYU	137
8	Colorado	126
9	Kansas State	121
10	Texas Tech	103
11	Iowa State	78
12	Utah	77
13	Arizona	55
14	Cincinnati	43
15	Houston	38
16	UCF	27
(#) first-place votes

=== Preseason All-Big 12 Team ===
No players were named to the Preseason All-Big 12 Team.

== Roster ==
2026–27 Kansas State Wildcats women's basketball team
Players
Coaches

Pos.	#	Name	Height	Year	Previous school	Hometown
G	3	Brandie Harrod	6 ft 1 in (1.85 m)	So	Putnam City North High School	Oklahoma City, OK
G	4	Nastja Claessens	6 ft 1 in (1.85 m)	Sr		Waregem, Belgium
G	6	Gina Garcia	5 ft 10 in (1.78 m)	So	Segle XXI	Barcelona, Spain
F	7	Cristina Osazuwa	6 ft 4 in (1.93 m)	Fr		Verona, Italy
G	10	Mikayla Parks	5 ft 10 in (1.78 m)	Jr	Norman High School	Norman, OK
G	11	Taryn Sides	5 ft 7 in (1.7 m)	Sr	Phillipsburg High School	Phillipsburg, KS
F	14	Shaila Nde	6 ft 2 in (1.88 m)	Fr	Segle XXI	Barcelona, Spain
C	22	Ramiya White	6 ft 5 in (1.96 m)	Jr	Butler Traditional High School; Virginia Tech	Louisville, KY
G	24	Sage Henry	5 ft 9 in (1.75 m)	Fr	Hamilton High School	Gilbert, AZ
G	25	Téa Cléante	5 ft 9 in (1.75 m)	So	Penn State	Dunkirk, France
C	27	Tzoana Tampakou	6 ft 5 in (1.96 m)	Fr		Lesbos, Greece
C	99	Ivona Šćekić	6 ft 3 in (1.91 m)	So		Ljubljana, Slovenia

Head coach

- Jeff Mittie (Missouri Western)

Assistant coach(es)

- Ebony Gilliam (TCU)
- Dylan Geissert (Emporia State)
- Madison Pahls (Fort Hays State)

Legend

- (C) Team captain
- (S) Suspended
- (I) Ineligible
- (W) Walk-on
- Injured
- Current redshirt

Roster
Last update: August 7, 2026

== Schedule and results ==
Date time, TV	Rank^{#}	Opponent^{#}	Result	Record	High points	High rebounds	High assists	Site (attendance) city, state
Non-conference regular season
November 2, 2026*; 6:30 p.m., ESPN+		Wichita State	W 61–41	1–0	15 – Sides	9 – Nde	6 – Garcia	Bramlage Coliseum (2,872); Manhattan, KS
November 5, 2026*; 6:30 p.m., ESPN+		Southern Indiana	W 61–47	2–0	16 – Sides	11 – Nde	5 – Sides	Bramlage Coliseum (2,783); Manhattan, KS
November 8, 2026*; 12:00 p.m., ESPN+		UTRGV	W 68–39	3–0	16 – Tampakou	6 – Nde	8 – Sides	Bramlage Coliseum (3,100); Manhattan, KS
November 10, 2026*; 11:00 a.m., ESPN+		Montana	W 67–62	4–0	18 – Sides	8 – Nde	6 – Garcia	Bramlage Coliseum (7,812); Manhattan, KS
November 14, 2026*; 1:00 p.m., B1G+		vs. No. 18 Minnesota; MarketBeat Invitational	L 65–68	4–1	20 – Classens	8 – Nde	7 – Garcia	Sanford Pentagon; Sioux Falls, SD
November 17, 2026*; 6:30 p.m., ESPN+		SMU	W 61-51	5-1	13 – Tied	12 – Nde	4 – Garcia	Bramlage Coliseum (3,145); Manhattan, KS
November 22, 2026*; 6:30 p.m.		vs. Missouri; 28.5 Hoops Women's Invitational						T-Mobile Center; Kansas City, MO
November 27, 2026*; 6:00 p.m., ION		vs. NC State; Fort Myers Tip-Off Island Division						Suncoast Credit Union Arena; Fort Myers, FL
November 28, 2026*; 6:00 p.m., ION		vs. Villanova; Fort Myers Tip-Off Island Division						Suncoast Credit Union Arena; Fort Myers, FL
December 1, 2026*; 6:30 p.m., ESPN+		Central Arkansas						Bramlage Coliseum; Manhattan, KS
December 3, 2026*; 6:30 p.m., ESPN+		Northern Iowa						Bramlage Coliseum; Manhattan, KS
December 6, 2026*; 1:00 p.m., ESPN+		Stephen F. Austin						Bramlage Coliseum; Manhattan, KS
December 8, 2026*; 5:30 p.m., ESPN+		Western Illinois						Bramlage Coliseum; Manhattan, KS
December 12, 2026*; 5:00 p.m.		vs. Creighton; Bill Snyder Classic						St. Joseph Civic Arena; St. Joseph, MO
Big 12 regular season
December 19, 2026; 4:00 p.m., ESPN+		Iowa State						Bramlage Coliseum; Manhattan, KS
December 30, 2026; 8:00 p.m., ESPN+		at BYU						Marriott Center; Provo, UT
January 2, 2027; 6:00 p.m., ESPN+		at Utah						Jon M. Huntsman Center; Salt Lake City, UT
January 6, 2027; 6:30 p.m., ESPN+		UCF						Bramlage Coliseum; Manhattan, KS
January 9, 2027; 5:00 p.m., ESPN+		Arizona						Bramlage Coliseum; Manhattan, KS
January 13, 2027; 4:00 p.m., CBSSN		at West Virginia						Hope Coliseum; Morgantown, WV
January 16, 2027; 2:00 p.m., ESPN+		at Iowa State						Hilton Coliseum; Ames, IA
January 20, 2027; 6:30 p.m., ESPN+		Houston						Bramlage Coliseum; Manhattan, KS
January 24, 2027; 1:00 p.m., ESPN+		Arizona State						Bramlage Coliseum; Manhattan, KS
January 27, 2027; 5:30 p.m., ESPN+		at Cincinnati						Fifth Third Arena; Cincinnati, OH
January 31, 2027; 2:00 p.m., ESPN+		at Kansas; Sunflower Showdown						Allen Fieldhouse; Lawrence, KS
February 4, 2027; 7:00 p.m., FS1		TCU						Bramlage Coliseum; Manhattan, KS
February 7, 2027; 1:00 p.m., ESPN+		Texas Tech						Bramlage Coliseum; Manhattan, KS
February 10, 2027; 7:00 p.m., ESPN+		at Baylor						Foster Pavilion; Waco, TX
February 15, 2027; 12:00 p.m., FOX		at Oklahoma State						Gallagher-Iba Arena; Stillwater, OK
February 20, 2027; 5:00 p.m., CBSSN		Kansas State; Sunflower Showdown						Bramlage Coliseum; Manhattan, KS
February 25, 2027; 7:30 p.m., FS1		Baylor						Bramlage Coliseum; Manhattan, KS
February 28, 2027; 2:00 p.m., ESPN+		at Colorado						CU Events Center; Boulder, CO
Big 12 tournament
March 3–7, 2027; TBA		vs.						T-Mobile Center; Kansas City, MO
*Non-conference game. ^{#}Rankings from AP Poll. (#) Tournament seedings in parentheses. All times are in Central.
