= 2026–27 Iowa State Cyclones women's basketball team =

American college basketball season

2026–27 Iowa State Cyclones women's basketball
- Conference: Big 12 Conference
- Record: 6–0 (0–0 Big 12)
- Head coach: Bill Fennelly (32nd season)
- Associate head coach: Caroline McCombs
- Assistant coaches: Billy Fennelle; Emily Hatfield; Rob Jenkins; Emily Ryan
- Home arena: Hilton Coliseum

2026–27 Big 12 women's basketball standings
	Conf.				Overall
Team	W		L	PCT	W		L	PCT
No. 15 TCU	0	–	0	–	7	–	0	1.000
BYU	0	–	0	–	6	–	0	1.000
Iowa State	0	–	0	–	6	–	0	1.000
Arizona State	0	–	0	–	5	–	0	1.000
Baylor	0	–	0	–	5	–	0	1.000
Colorado	0	–	0	–	5	–	0	1.000
Houston	0	–	0	–	5	–	0	1.000
Utah	0	–	0	–	5	–	0	1.000
No. 22 West Virginia	0	–	0	–	5	–	0	1.000
Texas Tech	0	–	0	–	4	–	0	1.000
Kansas State	0	–	0	–	5	–	1	.833
No. 25 Oklahoma State	0	–	0	–	5	–	1	.833
UCF	0	–	0	–	5	–	1	.833
Cincinnati	0	–	0	–	4	–	1	.800
Arizona	0	–	0	–	3	–	1	.750
Kansas	0	–	0	–	3	–	2	.600
† 2027 Big 12 tournament winner As of November 19, 2026; Rankings from AP poll

The 2026–27 Iowa State Cyclones women's basketball team currently represents Iowa State University during the 2026–27 NCAA Division I women's basketball season. The Cyclones, led by thirty-second year head coach Bill Fennelly, play their home games at the Hilton Coliseum in Ames, Iowa and compete as a member of the Big 12 Conference.

== Previous season ==
The Cyclones finished the 2025–26 season 22–10 overall and 10–8 in Big Ten play, to finish in a tie for seventh in the conference with BYU. As the No. 7 seed in the Big 12 tournament, they earned a double-bye to the quarterfinals, where they lost 68–77 to No. 10 Arizona State.

Following their tournament elimination, the Cyclones earned an at-large bid to the NCAA tournament, where they were the No. 8 seed in the Fort Worth #1 Regional. They lost in the first round 63–72 to No. 9 Syracuse to end their season.

== Offseason ==
=== Departures ===
Iowa State Departures
Name	Number	Pos.	Height	Year	Hometown	Reason for Departure
Reese Beaty	0	Guard	5'8"	Freshman	Jamestown, TN	Transferred to Mississippi State
Alissa Williams	3	Forward	6'2"	(redshirt) Junior	Denton, TX	Transferred to Indiana
Jada Williams	8	Guard	5'8"	Junior	Kansas City, MO	Transferred to LSU
Lily Taulelei	9	Center/Forward	6'3"	Junior	Wellington, New Zealand	Transferred to Rice
Kenzie Hare	12	Guard	5'9"	(redshirt) Junior	Bartlett, IL	Graduated, transferred to Indiana
Reagan Wilson	22	Guard	5'8"	Sophomore	Noblesville, IN	Transferred to Toledo
Addy Brown	24	Forward	6'2"	Junior	Derby, KS	Transferred to UCLA
Sydney Harris	25	Guard/Forward	6'1"	Senior	Edwardsville, IL	Graduated
Aili Tanke	32	Guard	5'11"	Sophomore	Johnston, IA	Transferred to Nevada
Audi Crooks	55	Center	6'3"	Junior	Algona, IA	Transferred to Oklahoma State

=== Incoming transfers ===
Iowa State incoming transfers
Name	Number	Pos.	Height	Year	Hometown	Previous School
Sienna Harvey	1	Guard	5'10"	Sophomore	Wodonga, Australia	Washington
Mya Babbitt	3	Guard	5'8"	Senior	Papillion, NE	Kent State
Emilija Dakic	8	Guard	5'10"	Sophomore	Melbourne, Australia	Florida
Alex-Anne Bessette	10	Guard/Forward	6'2"	Sophomore	Quebec City, QC	Loyola Chicago
Ashleigh Connor	15	Guard	5'11"	(redshirt) Senior	Pittsburgh, PA	La Salle
Gift Ezekiel	21	Forward	6'1"	Senior	Edo, Nigeria	Florida
Reggi Spotts	22	Guard	5'8"	Junior	Nora Springs, IA	North Iowa Area CC (NJCAA)
Xiao Zhang	24	Center	6'6"	Senior	Suzhou, China	Beijing Normal University (China)

=== Recruiting class ===
College recruiting
Name	Hometown	School	Height	Weight	Commit date
Macy Comito; G	Carlisle, IA	Carlisle High School	5 ft 8 in (1.73 m)	N/A	
Macy Comito; G	Recruit ratings: ESPN: (91)				
Overall recruit ranking:
Note: In many cases, Scout, Rivals, 247Sports, On3, and ESPN may conflict in their listings of height and weight.; In these cases, the average was taken. ESPN grades are on a 100-point scale.; Sources: "2026 Player Commits". ESPN. Archived from the original on August 6, 2026.

== Preseason ==
On October 8, 2026, the Big 12 Conference released its annual preseason coaches poll and awards. Iowa State was picked to finish eleventh in the conference.

=== Preseason rankings ===
Big 12 Preseason Coaches Poll
Place	Team	Votes
1	Oklahoma State	215 (1)
2	TCU	212 (6)
3	Baylor	199 (2)
4	West Virginia	186 (1)
5	Kansas	160
6	Arizona State	143
7	BYU	137
8	Colorado	126
9	Kansas State	121
10	Texas Tech	103
11	Iowa State	78
12	Utah	77
13	Arizona	55
14	Cincinnati	43
15	Houston	38
16	UCF	27
(#) first-place votes

=== Preseason All-Big 12 Team ===
No players were named to the Preseason All-Big 12 Team.

== Roster ==
2026–27 Iowa State Cyclones women's basketball team
Players
Coaches

Pos.	#	Name	Height	Year	Previous school	Hometown
G	1	Sienna Harvey	5 ft 10 in (1.78 m)	So	UC Senior Secondary College Lake Ginninderra; Washington	Wodonga, Australia
G	2	Arianna Jackson	5 ft 9 in (1.75 m)	Sr	Theodore Roosevelt High School	Des Moines, IA
G	3	Mya Babbitt	5 ft 8 in (1.73 m)	Sr	Millard South High School; Kent State	Papillion, NE
G	5	Evangelia Paulk	6 ft 0 in (1.83 m)	Sr	Asheville High School; Wofford	Asheville, NC
G	7	Freya Jensen	5 ft 10 in (1.78 m)	So	Risskov Gymnasium	Risskov, Denmark
G	8	Emilija Dakic	5 ft 10 in (1.78 m)	So	Rowville Secondary College; Florida	Melbourne, Australia
G/F	10	Alex-Anne Bessette	6 ft 2 in (1.88 m)	So	Cairine Wilson Secondary School; Loyola Chicago	Quebec City, QC
G	15	Ashleigh Connor	5 ft 11 in (1.8 m)	RS Sr	Mount Lebanon High School; La Salle	Pittsburgh, PA
F	21	Gift Ezekiel	6 ft 1 in (1.85 m)	Sr	Florida	Edo, Nigeria
G	22	Reggi Spotts	5 ft 8 in (1.73 m)	Jr	Mason City High School; North Iowa Area Community College	Nora Springs, IA
G	23	Macy Comito	5 ft 9 in (1.75 m)	Fr	Carlisle High School	Carlisle, IA
C	24	Xiao Zhang	6 ft 6 in (1.98 m)	Sr	Xi'an Tieyi High School; Beijing Normal University	Suzhou, China
F	46	Tjaša Turnšek	6 ft 2 in (1.88 m)	Fr	Šolski center Rogaška Slatina	Rogaska Slatina, Slovenia

Head coach

- Bill Fennelly (William Penn)

Assistant coach(es)

- Caroline McCombs (Youngstown State)
- Billy Fennelly (Iowa State)
- Emily Hatfield (Western Carolina)
- Rob Jenkins (North Carolina)
- Emily Ryan (Iowa State)

Legend

- (C) Team captain
- (S) Suspended
- (I) Ineligible
- (W) Walk-on
- Injured
- Current redshirt

Roster
Last update: August 6, 2026

== Schedule and results ==
Date time, TV	Rank^{#}	Opponent^{#}	Result	Record	High points	High rebounds	High assists	Site (attendance) city, state
Exhibition
October 28, 2026*; 6:30 p.m.		Upper Iowa	W 90–32	–	16 – Turnšek	8 – Ezekiel	4 – Harvey	Hilton Coliseum (8,791); Ames, IA
Non-conference regular season
November 2, 2026*; 6:30 p.m., ESPN+		Grambling State	W 90–61	1–0	19 – Turnšek	8 – Tied (2)	9 – Harvey	Hilton Coliseum (8,802); Ames, IA
November 5, 2026*; 6:30 p.m., ESPN+		Nicholls	W 68–44	2–0	18 – Turnšek	13 – Turnšek	4 – Harvey	Hilton Coliseum (8,819); Ames, IA
November 8, 2026*; 2:00 p.m., ESPN+		Eastern Illinois	W 77–61	3–0	20 – Turnšek	4 – Turnšek	9 – Harvey	Hilton Coliseum (8,895); Ames, IA
November 12, 2026*; 6:30 p.m., ESPN+		Howard	W 77–55	4–0	20 – Turnšek	12 – Turnšek	5 – Turnšek	Hilton Coliseum (8,786); Ames, IA
November 15, 2026*; 5:00 p.m., ESPN+		UIC	W 69–64	5–0	19 – Turnšek	7 – Connor	5 – Harvey	Hilton Coliseum (8,886); Ames, IA
November 18, 2026*; 6:00 p.m., ESPN+		at Northern Iowa	W 72–57	6–0	16 – Turnšek	7 – Turnšek	4 – Harvey	McLeod Center (3,102); Cedar Falls, IA
November 22, 2026*; 2:00 p.m., ESPN+		Drake						Hilton Coliseum; Ames, IA
November 27, 2026*; 3:00 p.m., BDG Live		vs. Belmont; Baha Mar Hoops Nassau Championship						Baha Mar Convention Center; Nassau, Bahamas
November 29, 2026*; 12:30 p.m., BDG Live		vs. USC; Baha Mar Hoops Nassau Championship						Baha Mar Convention Center; Nassau, Bahamas
December 1, 2026*; 11:00 a.m., ESPN+		Norfolk State						Hilton Coliseum; Ames, IA
December 6, 2026*; 2:00 p.m., ESPN+		Loyola Chicago						Hilton Coliseum; Ames, IA
December 9, 2026*; 7:00 p.m., FS1		at Iowa; Rivalry						Carver–Hawkeye Arena; Iowa City, IA
December 13, 2026*; 12:00 p.m., ESPN+		Chicago State						Hilton Coliseum; Ames, IA
Big 12 regular season
December 19, 2026; 4:00 p.m., ESPN+		at Kansas State						Bramlage Coliseum; Manhattan, KS
December 30, 2026; 6:30 p.m., ESPN+		TCU						Hilton Coliseum; Ames, IA
January 3, 2027; 3:00 p.m., ESPN+		at Arizona						McKale Center; Tucson, AZ
January 6, 2027; 7:30 p.m., ESPN+		at Arizona State						Desert Financial Arena; Tempe, AZ
January 9, 2027; 7:00 p.m., FS1		Oklahoma State						Hilton Coliseum; Ames, IA
January 16, 2027; 2:00 p.m., ESPN+		Kansas State						Hilton Coliseum; Ames, IA
January 20, 2027; 6:30 p.m., ESPN+		at Kansas						Allen Fieldhouse; Lawrence, KS
January 23, 2027; 1:00 p.m., ESPN+		at West Virginia						Hope Coliseum; Morgantown, WV
January 27, 2027; 6:30 p.m., ESPN+		Houston						Hilton Coliseum; Ames, IA
January 30, 2027; 3:00 p.m., FS1		at Baylor						Foster Pavilion; Waco, TX
February 3, 2027; 6:30 p.m., ESPN+		Texas Tech						Hilton Coliseum; Ames, IA
February 6, 2027; 2:00 p.m., ESPN+		Colorado						Hilton Coliseum; Ames, IA
February 10, 2027; 5:30 p.m., ESPN+		at Cincinnati						Fifth Third Arena; Cincinnati, OH
February 13, 2027; 6:00 p.m., ESPN+		BYU						Hilton Coliseum; Ames, IA
February 17, 2027; 6:30 p.m., ESPN+		Utah						Hilton Coliseum; Ames, IA
February 20, 2027; 1:00 p.m., ESPN+		at UCF						Addition Financial Arena; Orlando, FL
February 24, 2027; 6:30 p.m., ESPN+		Kansas						Hilton Coliseum; Ames, IA
February 27, 2027; 1:30 p.m., FS1		at Oklahoma State						Gallagher-Iba Arena; Stillwater, OK
Big 12 tournament
March 3–7, 2027; TBA		vs.						T-Mobile Center; Kansas City, MO
*Non-conference game. ^{#}Rankings from AP Poll. (#) Tournament seedings in parentheses. All times are in Central.
