= 2026–27 UCF Knights women's basketball team =

American college basketball season

2026–27 UCF Knights women's basketball
- Conference: Big 12 Conference
- Record: 3–1 (0–0 Big 12)
- Head coach: Gabe Lazo (1st season)
- Assistant coaches: Lynn Bria; Bett Shelby; Sydnei McCaskill; Josh Theis
- Home arena: Addition Financial Arena

2026–27 Big 12 women's basketball standings
	Conf.				Overall
Team	W		L	PCT	W		L	PCT
BYU	0	–	0	–	4	–	0	1.000
Kansas State	0	–	0	–	4	–	0	1.000
No. 15 TCU	0	–	0	–	4	–	0	1.000
Arizona State	0	–	0	–	3	–	0	1.000
Baylor	0	–	0	–	3	–	0	1.000
Colorado	0	–	0	–	3	–	0	1.000
Houston	0	–	0	–	3	–	0	1.000
Iowa State	0	–	0	–	3	–	0	1.000
Kansas	0	–	0	–	3	–	0	1.000
No. 19т Oklahoma State	0	–	0	–	3	–	0	1.000
Utah	0	–	0	–	3	–	0	1.000
No. 24 West Virginia	0	–	0	–	3	–	0	1.000
Arizona	0	–	0	–	2	–	0	1.000
Texas Tech	0	–	0	–	2	–	0	1.000
UCF	0	–	0	–	3	–	1	.750
Cincinnati	0	–	0	–	2	–	1	.667
† 2027 Big 12 tournament winner As of November 13, 2026; Rankings from AP poll

The 2026–27 UCF Knights women's basketball team currently represents the University of Central Florida during the 2026–27 NCAA Division I women's basketball season. The Knights, led by first-year head coach Gabe Lazo, play their home games at the Addition Financial Arena in Orlando, Florida, and compete as a member of the Big 12 Conference.

== Previous season ==
The Knights finished the 2025–26 season 11–19 overall and 3–15 in Big 12 play, to finish in a tie for fourteenth place in the conference with Arizona. As the No. 15 seed in the Big 12 tournament, they lost in the first round to No. 11 Kansas 35–56 to end their season. Their 11–19 record was their worst in a decade, when the 2015–16 team went 7–23.

On March 30, 2026, head coach Sytia Messer was fired after four seasons with the program, in which she went 49–69 and never posted a winning record. Five days later, on April 4, the program announced the hiring of Tennessee assistant coach Gabe Lazo as the team's new head coach. He had previously been announced as a new assistant coach for LSU on March 31, but decided not to join the team, to instead become the head coach at UCF.

== Offseason ==
=== Departures ===
UCF departures
Name	Number	Pos.	Height	Year	Hometown	Reason for departure
Samari Bankhead	1	Guard	6'0"	Freshman	Los Angeles, CA	Transferred to Seton Hall
Kristol Ayson	2	Guard	5'8"	Fifth year	Tacoma, WA	Exhausted eligibility
Jacorriah Bracey	3	Guard	5'9"	Graduate student	Drew, MS	Graduated
Logan Reed	5	Guard/Forward	6'0"	(redshirt) Freshman	Godley, TX	Transferred to Texas Woman's (D-II)
Meja Hänsel	9	Forward	6'2"	Freshman	Stockholm, Sweden	Transferred to Jacksonville State
Kayanna Cox	12	Guard	5'10"	Sophomore	Tenaha, TX	Transferred to Incarnate Word
Summer Yancy	13	Guard/Forward	5'11"	Sophomore	Kansas City, MO	Transferred to George Mason
Audreonia Benson	14	Guard	5'7"	Junior	Trussville, AL	Transferred to Arkansas State
Savannah Scott	30	Center	6'4"	(redshirt) Sophomore	Conway, AR	Transferred to Auburn
Khyala Ngodu	35	Center	6'3"	Junior	Fort Lauderdale, FL	Transferred to West Virginia
Leah Harmon	42	Guard	5'6"	Sophomore	Paterson, NJ	Transferred to Minnesota

=== Incoming transfers ===
UCF incoming transfers
Name	Number	Pos.	Height	Year	Hometown	Previous school
Key Roseby	0	Guard	6'0"	Junior	Dallas, TX	Stephen F. Austin
Kya Hurt	2	Guard	5'8"	Sophomore	Indianapolis, IN	Illinois State
Candace Kpetikou	3	Center	6'3"	(redshirt) Junior	Niamey, Niger	Miami (FL)
Caitlyn Jones	5	Guard	5'8"	Sophomore	Wake Forest, NC	Wake Forest
Nyla McFadden	8	Guard	6'0"	Sophomore	Fort Lauderdale, FL	Penn State
Vittoria Blasigh	10	Guard	5'9"	Senior	Udine, Italy	Miami (FL)
Mikayla Johnson	23	Guard	6'1"	(redshirt) Senior	Anchorage, AK	Pittsburgh

=== Recruiting class ===
There was no 2026 recruiting class.

== Preseason ==
On October 8, 2026, the Big 12 Conference released its annual preseason coaches poll and awards. UCF was picked to finish last in the conference.

=== Preseason rankings ===
Big 12 Preseason Coaches Poll
Place	Team	Votes
1	Oklahoma State	215 (1)
2	TCU	212 (6)
3	Baylor	199 (2)
4	West Virginia	186 (1)
5	Kansas	160
6	Arizona State	143
7	BYU	137
8	Colorado	126
9	Kansas State	121
10	Texas Tech	103
11	Iowa State	78
12	Utah	77
13	Arizona	55
14	Cincinnati	43
15	Houston	38
16	UCF	27
(#) first-place votes

=== Preseason All-Big 12 Team ===
No players were named to the Preseason All-Big 12 Team.

== Roster ==
2026–27 UCF Knights women's basketball team
Players
Coaches

Pos.	#	Name	Height	Year	Previous school	Hometown
G	0	Key Roseby	6 ft 0 in (1.83 m)	Jr	Frisco Liberty High School; Stephen F. Austin	Dallas, TX
F	1	Salomé Boyomo	6 ft 2 in (1.88 m)	Fr		Poitiers, France
G	2	Kya Hurt	5 ft 8 in (1.73 m)	So	Lawrence North High School; Illinois State	Indianapolis, IN
C	3	Candace Kpetikou	6 ft 3 in (1.91 m)	RS Jr	St. Joseph High School; Miami (FL)	Niamey, Niger
G	5	Caitlyn Jones	5 ft 8 in (1.73 m)	So	Rolesville High School; Wake Forest	Wake Forest, NC
G	7	Felicia Schölander	5 ft 9 in (1.75 m)	So		Stockholm, Sweden
G	8	Nyla McFadden	6 ft 0 in (1.83 m)	So	St. Thomas Aquinas High School; Penn State	Fort Lauderdale, FL
G	10	Vitoria Blasigh	5 ft 9 in (1.75 m)	Sr	Libertas Sporting; Miami (FL)	Udine, Italy
G	12	Jabria Lindsey	5 ft 9 in (1.75 m)	Fr	Central High School	Phenix City, AL
G	23	Mikayla Johnson	6 ft 1 in (1.85 m)	RS Sr	Bartlett High School; Pittsburgh	Anchorage, AK
F	24	Jasmynne Gibson	6 ft 1 in (1.85 m)	Jr	Colonial High School; North Florida	Orlando, FL
F	33	Mahogany Chandler-Roberts	6 ft 2 in (1.88 m)	Jr	Benson Polytechnic High School	Portland, OR
G	55	Maria Cintas	5 ft 4 in (1.63 m)	Fr		Barcelona, Spain

Head coach

- Gabe Lazo (Barry)

Assistant coach(es)

- Lynn Bria (College of Charleston)
- Bett Shelby (Greensboro)
- Sydnei McCaskill (Florida Gulf Coast)
- Josh Theis (Xavier)

Legend

- (C) Team captain
- (S) Suspended
- (I) Ineligible
- (W) Walk-on
- Injured
- Current redshirt

Roster
Last update: August 7, 2026

== Schedule and results ==
Date time, TV	Rank^{#}	Opponent^{#}	Result	Record	High points	High rebounds	High assists	Site (attendance) city, state
Exhibition
October 14, 2026*; 1:00 p.m., YouTube		vs. Auburn; Ballin' in Boutwell	L 59–65		19 – Blasigh	7 – Blasigh	6 – Jones	Boutwell Auditorium; Birmingham, AL
October 25, 2026*; 1:00 p.m.		Saint Leo	W 99–50		–	–	–	Addition Financial Arena; Orlando, FL
Non-conference regular season
November 3, 2026*; 6:30 p.m., ESPN+		Florida A&M	W 85–56	1–0	22 – Roseby	8 – Gibson	5 – Jones	Addition Financial Arena (912); Orlando, FL
November 5, 2026*; 4:30 p.m., SECN+		at Florida	L 65–95	1–1	20 – Chandler-Roberts	7 – Chandler-Roberts	4 – Tied	O'Connell Center (1,486); Gainesville, FL
November 9, 2026*; 6:30 p.m., ESPN+		South Alabama	W 85–59	2–1	21 – Chandler-Roberts	11 – McFadden	6 – Jones	Addition Financial Arena (722); Orlando, FL
November 11, 2026*; 6:30 p.m., ESPN+		Austin Peay	W 64–59	3–1	18 – Blasigh	6 – Tied (2)	3 – Blasigh	Addition Financial Arena (813); Orlando, FL
November 13, 2026*; 5:30 p.m., ESPN+		Le Moyne						Addition Financial Arena; Orlando, FL
November 17, 2026*; 11:00 a.m., ESPN+		North Florida						Addition Financial Arena; Orlando, FL
November 19, 2026*; 6:30 p.m., ESPN+		Stetson						Addition Financial Arena; Orlando, FL
November 21, 2026*; 12:00 p.m., ESPN+		vs. Florida State; WBCA Showcase						State Farm Field House; Orlando, FL
November 24, 2026*; 6:30 p.m., ESPN+		Jacksonville						Addition Financial Arena; Orlando, FL
November 27, 2026*; TBA		vs. Charlotte; Florida Gulf Classic						Community School of Naples; Naples, FL
November 28, 2026*; TBA		vs. Central Michigan; Florida Gulf Classic						Community School of Naples; Naples, FL
December 2, 2026*; 6:30 p.m., ESPN+		Tulane						Addition Financial Arena; Orlando, FL
December 7, 2026*; 6:30 p.m., ESPN+		Morgan State						Addition Financial Arena; Orlando, FL
December 15, 2026*; 6:30 p.m., ESPN+		Florida Atlantic						Addition Financial Arena; Orlando, FL
Big 12 regular season
December 20, 2026; 2:00 p.m., ESPN+		West Virginia						Addition Financial Arena; Orlando, FL
December 30, 2026; 6:30 p.m., ESPN+		at Cincinnati						Fifth Third Arena; Cincinnati, OH
January 2, 2027; 1:00 p.m., ESPN+		Arizona State						Addition Financial Arena; Orlando, FL
January 6, 2027; 7:30 p.m., ESPN+		at Kansas State						Bramlage Coliseum; Manhattan, KS
January 9, 2027; 8:00 p.m., ESPN+		at Colorado						CU Events Center; Boulder, CO
January 12, 2027; 6:30 p.m., ESPN+		Cincinnati						Addition Financial Arena; Orlando, FL
January 16, 2027; 2:00 p.m., ESPN+		at Houston						Fertitta Center; Houston, TX
January 20, 2027; 6:30 p.m., ESPN+		Arizona						Addition Financial Arena; Orlando, FL
January 23, 2027; 6:00 p.m., ESPN+		Texas Tech						Addition Financial Arena; Orlando, FL
January 27, 2027; 9:00 p.m., ESPN+		at BYU						Marriott Center; Provo, UT
January 30, 2027; 4:00 p.m., ESPN+		at Utah						Jon M. Huntsman Center; Salt Lake City, UT
February 4, 2027; 6:30 p.m., ESPN+		Oklahoma State						Addition Financial Arena; Orlando, FL
February 7, 2027; 2:00 p.m., ESPN+		Baylor						Addition Financial Arena; Orlando, FL
February 13, 2027; 1:30 p.m., ESPN+		at Texas Tech						United Supermarkets Arena; Lubbock, TX
February 16, 2027; 7:30 p.m., ESPN+		at Kansas						Allen Fieldhouse; Lawrence, KS
February 20, 2027; 2:00 p.m., ESPN+		Iowa State						Addition Financial Arena; Orlando, FL
February 23, 2027; 7:30 p.m., ESPN+		at TCU						Schollmaier Arena; Fort Worth, TX
February 27, 2027; 4:00 p.m., ESPN+		Houston						Addition Financial Arena; Orlando, FL
Big 12 tournament
March 3–7, 2027; TBA		vs.						T-Mobile Center; Kansas City, MO
*Non-conference game. ^{#}Rankings from AP Poll. (#) Tournament seedings in parentheses. All times are in Eastern.
