= 2026–27 Utah Utes women's basketball team =

2026–27 Utah Utes women's basketball
- Conference: Big 12 Conference
- Record: 6–0 (0–0 Big 12)
- Head coach: Gavin Petersen (3rd season)
- Assistant coaches: Jordan MacIntyre; Morgan Bailey; Ryan Larsen; Jace Henderson
- Home arena: Jon M. Huntsman Center

2026–27 Big 12 women's basketball standings
	Conf.				Overall
Team	W		L	PCT	W		L	PCT
No. 15 TCU	0	–	0	–	7	–	0	1.000
Arizona State	0	–	0	–	6	–	0	1.000
BYU	0	–	0	–	6	–	0	1.000
Iowa State	0	–	0	–	6	–	0	1.000
Utah	0	–	0	–	6	–	0	1.000
Colorado	0	–	0	–	5	–	0	1.000
Houston	0	–	0	–	5	–	0	1.000
No. 22 West Virginia	0	–	0	–	5	–	0	1.000
No. 25 Oklahoma State	0	–	0	–	6	–	1	.857
UCF	0	–	0	–	6	–	1	.857
Baylor	0	–	0	–	5	–	1	.833
Kansas State	0	–	0	–	5	–	1	.833
Arizona	0	–	0	–	4	–	1	.800
Cincinnati	0	–	0	–	4	–	1	.800
Texas Tech	0	–	0	–	4	–	1	.800
Kansas	0	–	0	–	3	–	2	.600
† 2027 Big 12 tournament winner As of November 21, 2026; Rankings from AP poll

The 2026–27 Utah Utes women's basketball team currently represents the University of Utah during the 2026–27 NCAA Division I women's basketball season. The Utes, led by third-year head coach Gavin Petersen, play their home games at the Jon M. Huntsman Center in Salt Lake City, Utah and compete as a member of the Big 12 Conference.

== Previous season ==
The Utes finished the 2025–26 season 19–13 overall and 10–8 in Big 12 play, to finish in a tie for seventh place in the conference alongside Iowa State. As the No. 8 seed in the Big 12 tournament, they lost in the first round to rival No. 9 BYU.

Following their tournament elimination, the Utes earned an at-large bid to the WBIT, their first appearance since the tournament's creation in 2024. This also marked the first time in four years that Utah failed to qualify for the NCAA tournament. In the WBIT, they were seeded No. 1 in their namesake bracket, where they lost in the first round 58–72 to Eastern Kentucky.

== Offseason ==
=== Departures ===
Utah departures
Name	Num	Pos.	Height	Year	Hometown	Reason for departure
Lani White	0	Guard	6'0"	Senior	Irvine, CA	Graduated, drafted 45th overall by the Minnesota Lynx in the 2026 WNBA draft
Avery Hjelmstad	1	Guard	6'1"	Freshman	Edmond, OK	Transferred to TCU
LA Sneed	2	Guard	5'6"	Freshman	San Antonio, TX	Transferred to Oklahoma State
Brooke Walker	3	Guard	5'9"	Sophomore	Andover, KS	Transferred to Colorado
Grace Foster	10	Guard	5'10"	Sophomore	Perth, Australia	Transferred to Boise State
Alyssa Blanck	15	Forward	6'2"	(redshirt) Junior	Salt Lake City, UT	Transferred to Montana State
Reese Ross	20	Forward	6'1"	Junior	Rapid City, SD	Transferred to Baylor
Maty Wilke	23	Guard	5'10"	Senior	Beaver Dam, WI	Graduated
Samantha Crispe	44	Forward	6'2"	Senior	Castle Pines, CO	Graduated

=== Incoming transfers ===
Utah incoming transfers
Name	Num	Pos.	Height	Year	Hometown	Previous school
Lena Girardi	2	Guard	5'11"	Sophomore	Purchase, NY	Oklahoma State
Olivia Bradley	3	Forward	6'1"	(redshirt) Junior	Adelaide, Australia	UC Santa Barbara
Filipa Barros	5	Guard	5'9"	(redshirt) Senior	Maia, Portugal	California Baptist
Laia Conesa	7	Guard	5'11"	Senior	Barcelona, Spain	Kansas
Elise Livingston	23	Guard	5'9"	Junior	Millville, UT	Utah State

=== Recruiting class ===
College recruiting
Name	Hometown	School	Height	Weight	Commit date
Peyton Jones; G	Highlands Ranch, CO	Valor Christian High School	5 ft 11 in (1.80 m)	N/A	
Peyton Jones; G	Recruit ratings: Rivals: 247Sports: ESPN: (93)				
Rylee Little; F	Kanab, UT	Kanab High School	6 ft 4 in (1.93 m)	N/A	
Rylee Little; F	Recruit ratings: Rivals: 247Sports: ESPN: (93)				
Milika Satuala; G	Bountiful, UT	Bountiful High School	5 ft 10 in (1.78 m)	N/A	
Milika Satuala; G	Recruit ratings: 247Sports:				
Overall recruit ranking:
Note: In many cases, Scout, Rivals, 247Sports, On3, and ESPN may conflict in their listings of height and weight.; In these cases, the average was taken. ESPN grades are on a 100-point scale.; Sources: "2026 Player Commits". ESPN. Archived from the original on August 5, 2026.

== Preseason ==
On October 8, 2026, the Big 12 Conference released its annual preseason coaches poll and awards. Utah was picked to finish twelfth in the conference.

=== Preseason rankings ===
Big 12 Preseason Coaches Poll
Place	Team	Votes
1	Oklahoma State	215 (1)
2	TCU	212 (6)
3	Baylor	199 (2)
4	West Virginia	186 (1)
5	Kansas	160
6	Arizona State	143
7	BYU	137
8	Colorado	126
9	Kansas State	121
10	Texas Tech	103
11	Iowa State	78
12	Utah	77
13	Arizona	55
14	Cincinnati	43
15	Houston	38
16	UCF	27
(#) first-place votes

=== Preseason All-Big 12 Team ===
No players were named to the Preseason All-Big 12 Team.

== Roster ==
2026–27 Utah Utes women's basketball team
Players
Coaches

Pos.	#	Name	Height	Year	Previous school	Hometown
G	2	Lena Girardi	5 ft 11 in (1.8 m)	So	Grandview Prep; Oklahoma State	Purchase, NY
G	3	Olivia Bradley	6 ft 1 in (1.85 m)	RS Jr	Urrbrae Agricultural High School; UC Santa Barbara	Adelaide, Australia
G	5	Filipa Barros	5 ft 9 in (1.75 m)	RS Sr	Urrbrae Agricultural High School; California Baptist	Maia, Portugal
F	6	Evelina Otto	6 ft 2 in (1.88 m)	So	Denver East High School	Ventspils, Latvia
G	7	Laia Conesa	5 ft 11 in (1.8 m)	Sr	Segle XXI Academy; Kansas	Barcelona, Spain
G	8	Peyton Jones	6 ft 0 in (1.83 m)	Fr	Valor Christian High School	Highlands Ranch, CO
G/F	11	Milika Satuala	5 ft 10 in (1.78 m)	Fr	Bountiful High School	Bountiful, UT
F	12	Chyra Evans	6 ft 3 in (1.91 m)	Sr	Centre of Excellence; Michigan	Newcastle, Australia
G/F	14	Kamryn Mafua	6 ft 1 in (1.85 m)	RS So	Folsom High School; California	Folsom, CA
F	17	Emma Petrie	6 ft 2 in (1.88 m)	Fr		Queensland, Australia
G	22	Ella Todd	6 ft 0 in (1.83 m)	RS Fr	William Fremd High School	Palatine, IL
G	23	Elise Livingston	5 ft 9 in (1.75 m)	Jr	Ridgeline High School; Utah State	Millville, UT
F	24	Rylee Little	6 ft 3 in (1.91 m)	Fr	Kanab High School	Kanab, UT

Head coach

- Gavin Petersen (Hawaiʻi)

Assistant coach(es)

- Jordan MacIntyre (Montana)
- Morgan Bailey (BYU)
- Ryan Larsen (MSU Moorhead)
- Jace Henderson (Montana)

Legend

- (C) Team captain
- (S) Suspended
- (I) Ineligible
- (W) Walk-on
- Injured
- Current redshirt

Roster
Last update: August 5, 2026

== Schedule and results ==
Date time, TV	Rank^{#}	Opponent^{#}	Result	Record	High points	High rebounds	High assists	Site (attendance) city, state
Exhibition
October 18, 2026*; 2:00 p.m.		Idaho	L 62–78		15 – Tied	8 – Barros	4 – Barros	Jon M. Huntsman Center (267); Salt Lake City, UT
Non-conference regular season
November 3, 2026*; 6:00 p.m., ESPN+		Eastern Washington	W 76–67	1–0	19 – Girardi	8 – Girardi	6 – Barros	Jon M. Huntsman Center (1,754); Salt Lake City, UT
November 6, 2026*; 7:00 p.m., ESPN+		Colorado State	W 72–63	2–0	26 – Girardi	8 – Girardi	3 – Tied	Jon M. Huntsman Center (1,728); Salt Lake City, UT
November 9, 2026*; 7:00 p.m., ESPN+		Bethune–Cookman	W 65–47	3–0	14 – Girardi	10 – Evans	5 – Conesa	Jon M. Huntsman Center (1,467); Salt Lake City, UT
November 13, 2026*; 6:30 p.m., Pac-12 YouTube		at Boise State	W 78–47	4–0	17 – Jones	8 – Evans	5 – Tied	ExtraMile Arena (2,097); Boise, ID
November 16, 2026*; 7:00 p.m., ESPN+		Houston Baptist	W 98–49	5–0	24 – Girardi	12 – Barros	10 – Barros	Jon M. Huntsman Center (1,524); Salt Lake City, UT
November 20, 2026*; 7:00 p.m., ESPN+		Utah Valley	W 92–66	6–0	29 – Girardi	7 – Little	5 – Barros	Jon M. Huntsman Center (1,710); Salt Lake City, UT
November 23, 2026*; 11:30 a.m., BDG Live		vs. Iowa; Baha Mar Pink Flamingo Championship						Baha Mar Convention Center; Nassau, Bahamas
November 25, 2025*; 2:00 p.m., BDG Live		vs. Miami (FL); Baha Mar Pink Flamingo Championship						Baha Mar Convention Center; Nassau, Bahamas
December 1, 2026*; 7:00 p.m., ESPN+		Utah State						Jon M. Huntsman Center; Salt Lake City, UT
December 6, 2026*; 2:00 p.m., ESPN+		Denver						Jon M. Huntsman Center; Salt Lake City, UT
December 12, 2026*; 2:00 p.m., ESPN+		Green Bay						Jon M. Huntsman Center; Salt Lake City, UT
December 15, 2026*; 7:00 p.m., ESPN+		Montana						Jon M. Huntsman Center; Salt Lake City, UT
Big 12 regular season
December 21, 2026; 1:00 p.m., ESPN+		at Arizona State						Desert Financial Arena; Tempe, AZ
December 30, 2026; 7:00 p.m., ESPN+		Houston						Jon M. Huntsman Center; Salt Lake City, UT
January 2, 2027; 5:00 p.m., ESPN+		Kansas State						Jon M. Huntsman Center; Salt Lake City, UT
January 6, 2027; 5:30 p.m., ESPN+		at TCU						Schollmaier Arena; Fort Worth, TX
January 9, 2027; 1:00 p.m., ESPN+		at Texas Tech						United Supermarkets Arena; Lubbock, TX
January 16, 2027; 5:00 p.m., ESPN+		Kansas						Jon M. Huntsman Center; Salt Lake City, UT
January 19, 2027; 7:00 p.m., ESPN+		Oklahoma State						Jon M. Huntsman Center; Salt Lake City, UT
January 23, 2027; 4:00 p.m., ESPN+		at Baylor						Foster Pavilion; Waco, TX
January 27, 2027; 6:00 p.m., ESPN+		Arizona						McKale Center; Tucson, AZ
January 30, 2027; 2:00 p.m., ESPN+		UCF						Jon M. Huntsman Center; Salt Lake City, UT
February 3, 2027; 7:00 p.m., ESPN+		BYU; Rivalry						Jon M. Huntsman Center; Salt Lake City, UT
February 6, 2027; 12:00 p.m., ESPN+		at Cincinnati						Fifth Third Arena; Cincinnati, OH
February 9, 2026; 5:00 p.m., ESPN+		at West Virginia						Hope Coliseum; Morgantown, WV
February 13, 2027; 5:00 p.m., ESPN+		Colorado						Jon M. Huntsman Center; Salt Lake City, UT
February 17, 2026; 5:30 p.m., ESPN+		at Iowa State						Hilton Coliseum; Ames, IA
February 21, 2027; 2:00 p.m., ESPN+		Arizona State						Jon M. Huntsman Center; Salt Lake City, UT
February 24, 2027; 7:00 p.m., ESPN+		Arizona						Jon M. Huntsman Center; Salt Lake City, UT
February 27, 2027; 2:00 p.m., ESPN+		at BYU; Rivalry						Marriott Center; Provo, UT
Big 12 tournament
March 3–7, 2027; TBA		vs.						T-Mobile Center; Kansas City, MO
*Non-conference game. ^{#}Rankings from AP Poll. (#) Tournament seedings in parentheses. All times are in Mountain Time.
