= 2026–27 Cincinnati Bearcats women's basketball team =

American college basketball season

2026–27 Cincinnati Bearcats women's basketball
- Conference: Big 12 Conference
- Record: 4–2 (0–0 Big 12)
- Head coach: Katrina Merriweather (4th season)
- Associate head coach: Ashley Barlow; Abby Jump; Kabrina Merriweather
- Assistant coaches: Abby Owings; Michal Miller
- Home arena: Fifth Third Arena

2026–27 Big 12 women's basketball standings
	Conf.				Overall
Team	W		L	PCT	W		L	PCT
BYU	0	–	0	–	7	–	0	1.000
No. 15 TCU	0	–	0	–	7	–	0	1.000
Arizona State	0	–	0	–	6	–	0	1.000
Houston	0	–	0	–	6	–	0	1.000
Iowa State	0	–	0	–	6	–	0	1.000
Utah	0	–	0	–	6	–	0	1.000
Colorado	0	–	0	–	5	–	0	1.000
No. 22 West Virginia	0	–	0	–	5	–	0	1.000
No. 25 Oklahoma State	0	–	0	–	6	–	1	.857
Baylor	0	–	0	–	5	–	1	.833
Kansas State	0	–	0	–	5	–	1	.833
Texas Tech	0	–	0	–	5	–	1	.833
Arizona	0	–	0	–	4	–	1	.800
UCF	0	–	0	–	6	–	2	.750
Cincinnati	0	–	0	–	4	–	2	.667
Kansas	0	–	0	–	3	–	2	.600
† 2027 Big 12 tournament winner As of November 22, 2026; Rankings from AP poll

The 2026–27 Cincinnati Bearcats women's basketball team currently represents the University of Cincinnati during the 2026–27 NCAA Division I women's basketball season. The Bearcats, led by fourth-year head coach Katrina Merriweather, play their home games at the Fifth Third Arena in Cincinnati, Ohio as a member of the Big 12 Conference.

== Previous season ==
The Bearcats finished the 2025–26 season 11–20 overall and 6–12 in Big 12 play, to finish in thirteenth in the conference. As the No. 13 seed in the Big 12 tournament, they lost in the first round to No. 12 Kansas State to end their season.

== Offseason ==
=== Departures ===
Cincinnati departures
Name	Num	Pos.	Height	Year	Hometown	Reason for departure
Mya Perry	1	Guard	5'11"	Senior	Reynoldsburg, OH	Graduated
Kylie Torrence	10	Forward	6'2"	Freshman	High Point, NC	Transferred to Alabama
Ramiyah Byrd	14	Forward	5'11"	(redshirt) Sophomore	Colorado Springs, CO	Transferred to Wake Forest
Alliance Ndiba	25	Forward	6'3"	(redshirt) Senior	Lubumbashi, D.R.C.	Exhausted eligiblity
Destiny Thomas	32	Center	6'4"	(redshirt) Junior	Jonesboro, AR	Transferred to Memphis
Delaney Snyder	33	Center	6'5"	Junior	Richmond, VA	Transferred to Old Dominion

=== Incoming transfers ===
Cincinnati incoming transfers
Name	Num	Pos.	Height	Year	Hometown	Previous school
Yar Tong	1	Forward	6'3"	(redshirt) Sophomore	Calgary, AL	UT Martin
Sahnya Jah	11	Guard/Forward	6'0"	Senior	Alexandria, VA	SMU
Jade Jones	14	Guard	5'10"	Sophomore	West Palm Beach, FL	Houston
Amber Bullard	16	Center	6'4"	Senior	Philadelphia, PA	Mount St. Mary's
Naomi Benson	22	Forward	6'2"	Sophomore	Streetsboro, OH	Illinois

== Preseason ==
On October 8, 2026, the Big 12 Conference released its annual preseason coaches poll and awards. Cincinnati was picked to finish fourteenth in the conference.

=== Preseason rankings ===
Big 12 Preseason Coaches Poll
Place	Team	Votes
1	Oklahoma State	215 (1)
2	TCU	212 (6)
3	Baylor	199 (2)
4	West Virginia	186 (1)
5	Kansas	160
6	Arizona State	143
7	BYU	137
8	Colorado	126
9	Kansas State	121
10	Texas Tech	103
11	Iowa State	78
12	Utah	77
13	Arizona	55
14	Cincinnati	43
15	Houston	38
16	UCF	27
(#) first-place votes

=== Preseason All-Big 12 Team ===
No players were named to the Preseason All-Big 12 Team.

=== Recruiting class ===
College recruiting
Name	Hometown	School	Height	Weight	Commit date
Jaidyn Gunter; G	McKinney, TX	Legion Prep Academy	5 ft 7 in (1.70 m)	N/A	
Jaidyn Gunter; G	Recruit ratings: 247Sports:				
Overall recruit ranking:
Note: In many cases, Scout, Rivals, 247Sports, On3, and ESPN may conflict in their listings of height and weight.; In these cases, the average was taken. ESPN grades are on a 100-point scale.; Sources: "2026 Player Commits". ESPN. Archived from the original on August 5, 2026.

== Roster ==
2026–27 Cincinnati Bearcats women's basketball team
Players
Coaches

Pos.	#	Name	Height	Year	Previous school	Hometown
F	1	Yar Tong	6 ft 3 in (1.91 m)	RS So	Edge School; UT Martin	Calgary, AB
G	2	Paige Whitted	5 ft 9 in (1.75 m)	So	Briarcrest Christian School	Memphis, TN
G	3	Reagan Jackson	5 ft 8 in (1.73 m)	Sr	Kennedale High School	Fort Worth, TX
G	4	Caliyah DeVillasee	5 ft 8 in (1.73 m)	So	Our Lady of Good Counsel High School	Owings Mills, MD
G	8	Joya Crawford	5 ft 8 in (1.73 m)	So	Dyersburg High School	Dyersburg, TN
G	9	Dee Alexander	6 ft 2 in (1.88 m)	So	Purcell Marian High School	Cincinnati, OH
G	10	Jaidyn Gunter	5 ft 7 in (1.7 m)	Fr	Legion Prep Academy	McKinney, TX
G/F	11	Sahnya Jah	6 ft 0 in (1.83 m)	Sr	Montverde Academy; SMU	Alexandria, VA
C	12	Zou Garba	6 ft 7 in (2.01 m)	Fr	Mount Zion Prep	Cotonou, Benin
G	13	Marta Fernández	5 ft 4 in (1.63 m)	Jr		Foz, Spain
G	14	Jade Jones	5 ft 10 in (1.78 m)	So	The King's Academy; Houston	West Palm Beach, FL
C	16	Amber Bullard	6 ft 4 in (1.93 m)	Sr	The Christian Academy; Mount St. Mary's	Philadelphia, PA
F	21	Kali Barrett	6 ft 2 in (1.88 m)	So	Cardinal Mooney High School	Bradenton, FL
F	22	Naomi Benson	6 ft 2 in (1.88 m)	So	Streetsboro High School; Illinois	Streetsboro, OH
C	42	Mary Carden	6 ft 6 in (1.98 m)	Jr	Idabel High School; Oral Roberts	Idabel, OK

Head coach

- Katrina Merriweather (Cincinnati)

Assistant coach(es)

- Ashley Barlow (Notre Dame)
- Abby Jump (Wright State)
- Kabrina Merriweather (Florida A&M)
- Abby Owings (Thomas More)
- Michal Miller (Cincinnati)

Legend

- (C) Team captain
- (S) Suspended
- (I) Ineligible
- (W) Walk-on
- Injured
- Current redshirt

Roster
Last update: August 5, 2026

== Schedule and results ==
Date time, TV	Rank^{#}	Opponent^{#}	Result	Record	High points	High rebounds	High assists	Site (attendance) city, state
Exhibition
October 28, 2026*; 6:30 p.m.		Georgetown College	W 91–50		–	–	–	Fifth Third Arena; Cincinnati, OH
Non-conference regular season
November 4, 2026*; 6:30 p.m., ESPN+		East Texas A&M	W 66–58	1–0	16 – DeVillasee	8 – Bullard	3 – Tied	Fifth Third Arena (1,326); Cincinnati, OH
November 7, 2026*; 2:00 p.m., ESPN+		Penn State	W 76–53	2–0	13 – DeVillasee	8 – Tied	5 – Tied	Fifth Third Arena (1,278); Cincinnati, OH
November 11, 2026*; 6:30 p.m., ESPN+		Saint Joseph's	L 56–67	2–1	18 – DeVillasee	13 – Benson	1 – Tied	Fifth Third Arena (1,333); Cincinnati, OH
November 15, 2026*; 2:30 p.m.		at Maryland Eastern Shore	W 66–52	3–1	19 – DeVillasee	11 – Bullard	3 – DeVillasee	Hytche Athletic Center; Princess Anne, MD
November 18, 2026*; 5:30 p.m., ESPN+		Western Carolina	W 63–45	4–1	13 – DeVillasee	7 – Tied	4 – Fernández	Fifth Third Arena (1,779); Cincinnati, OH
November 21, 2026*; 5:00 p.m., ESPN+		at UNLV	L 58–85	4–2	18 – Bullard	10 – Bullard	4 – Jah	Cox Pavilion (1,213); Paradise, NV
November 26, 2026*; 9:00 p.m., FloCollege		vs. Miami (OH); Cancun Challenge Riviera Tournament						Hard Rock Hotel Riviera Maya; Cancún, Mexico
November 27, 2026*; 9:00 p.m., FloCollege		vs. Minnesota; Cancun Challenge Riviera Tournament						Hard Rock Hotel Riviera Maya; Cancún, Mexico
December 2, 2026*; 11:00 a.m., ESPN+		Bellarmine						Fifth Third Arena; Cincinnati, OH
December 4, 2026*; 6:30 p.m., ESPN+		Ball State						Fifth Third Arena; Cincinnati, OH
December 6, 2026*; 2:00 p.m., ESPN+		at Toledo						Savage Arena; Toledo, OH
December 12, 2026*; 2:00 p.m., ESPN+		IU Indy						Fifth Third Arena; Cincinnati, OH
December 15, 2026*; 6:30 p.m., ESPN+		at Xavier; Crosstown Shootout						Cintas Center; Cincinnati, OH
Big 12 regular season
December 20, 2026; 3:00 p.m., ESPN+		at TCU						Schollmaier Arena; Fort Worth, TX
December 30, 2026; 6:30 p.m., ESPN+		UCF						Fifth Third Arena; Cincinnati, OH
January 2, 2027; 6:30 p.m., ESPN+		Kansas						Fifth Third Arena; Cincinnati, OH
January 5, 2027; 7:00 p.m., ESPN+		at Texas Tech						United Supermarkets Arena; Lubbock, TX
January 9, 2027; 2:00 p.m., ESPN+		Houston						Fifth Third Arena; Cincinnati, OH
January 12, 2027; 6:30 p.m., ESPN+		at UCF						Addition Financial Arena; Orlando, FL
January 17, 2027; 2:00 p.m., ESPN+		Colorado						Fifth Third Arena; Cincinnati, OH
January 23, 2027; 7:30 p.m., ESPN+		at Oklahoma State						Gallagher-Iba Arena; Stillwater, OK
January 27, 2027; 6:30 p.m., ESPN+		Kansas State						Fifth Third Arena; Cincinnati, OH
January 30, 2027; 2:00 p.m., ESPN+		at West Virginia						Hope Coliseum; Morgantown, WV
February 3, 2027; 8:00 p.m., ESPN+		at Baylor						Foster Pavilion; Waco, TX
February 6, 2027; 2:00 p.m., ESPN+		Utah						Fifth Third Arena; Cincinnati, OH
February 10, 2027; 6:30 p.m., ESPN+		Iowa State						Fifth Third Arena; Cincinnati, OH
February 13, 2027; 2:30 p.m., ESPN+		at Arizona State						Desert Financial Arena; Tempe, AZ
February 16, 2027; 8:00 p.m., ESPN+		at Arizona						McKale Center; Tucson, AZ
February 20, 2027; 12:00 p.m., ESPN+		BYU						Fifth Third Arena; Cincinnati, OH
February 23, 2027; 8:00 p.m., ESPN+		at Houston						Fertitta Center; Houston, TX
February 27, 2027; 2:00 p.m., ESPN+		West Virginia						Fifth Third Arena; Cincinnati, OH
Big 12 tournament
March 3–8, 2027; TBA		vs.						T-Mobile Center; Kansas City, MO
*Non-conference game. ^{#}Rankings from AP Poll. (#) Tournament seedings in parentheses. All times are in Eastern.

== Rankings ==
Ranking movements Legend: — = Not ranked
	Week																				
Poll	Pre	1	2	3	4	5	6	7	8	9	10	11	12	13	14	15	16	17	18	19	Final
AP	—	—																			
Coaches	—																				

== See Also ==
2026–27 Cincinnati Bearcats men's basketball team
