= 2026–27 Kansas Jayhawks women's basketball team =

American college basketball season

2026–27 Kansas Jayhawks women's basketball
- Conference: Big 12 Conference
- Record: 3–2 (0–0 Big 12)
- Head coach: Brandon Schneider (12th season)
- Associate head coach: Brock McGinnis
- Assistant coaches: Jerise Freeman; Patrick Schrater; Jayci Stone
- Home arena: Allen Fieldhouse

2026–27 Big 12 women's basketball standings
	Conf.				Overall
Team	W		L	PCT	W		L	PCT
No. 15 TCU	0	–	0	–	6	–	0	1.000
Arizona State	0	–	0	–	5	–	0	1.000
Baylor	0	–	0	–	5	–	0	1.000
BYU	0	–	0	–	5	–	0	1.000
Houston	0	–	0	–	5	–	0	1.000
Iowa State	0	–	0	–	5	–	0	1.000
Utah	0	–	0	–	5	–	0	1.000
No. 22 West Virginia	0	–	0	–	5	–	0	1.000
Colorado	0	–	0	–	4	–	0	1.000
Texas Tech	0	–	0	–	4	–	0	1.000
Kansas State	0	–	0	–	5	–	1	.833
UCF	0	–	0	–	5	–	1	.833
No. 25 Oklahoma State	0	–	0	–	4	–	1	.800
Arizona	0	–	0	–	3	–	1	.750
Cincinnati	0	–	0	–	3	–	1	.750
Kansas	0	–	0	–	3	–	1	.750
† 2027 Big 12 tournament winner As of November 19, 2026; Rankings from AP poll

The 2026–27 Kansas Jayhawks women's basketball team currently represents the University of Kansas during the 2026–27 NCAA Division I women's basketball season. The Jayhawks led by twelfth-year head coach Brandon Schneider, play their home games at the Allen Fieldhouse in Lawrence, Kansas as a member of the Big 12 Conference.

== Previous season ==
The Jayhawks finished the 2025–26 season 22–14 overall and 8–10 in Big 12 play, to finish in a tie for eleventh in the conference with rival Kansas State. As the No. 11 seed in the Big 12 tournament, they defeated No. 14 UCF in the first round before falling 48–55 to No. 6 Colorado in the second round.

Following the tournament elimination, the Jayhawks received an at-large bid to the WBIT for the first time, seeded No. 2 in the Texas A&M bracket. They defeated Troy and No. 2 Rice in the first and second rounds respectively, as well as No. 4 San Diego State in the quarterfinals, before losing 67–70 to fellow Big 12 member and namesake Bracket No. 1 seed BYU in the semifinals to end their season.

== Offseason ==
=== Departures ===
Kansas departures
Name	Num	Pos.	Height	Year	Hometown	Reason for departure
Keeley Parks	4	Guard	5'11"	Freshman	Norman, OK	Transferred to Oklahoma
Laia Conesa	6	Guard	5'11"	Junior	Barcelona, Spain	Transferred to Utah
Elle Evans	21	Guard	6'3"	Senior	Edwardsville, IL	Graduated; signed to play professionally in Italy with Limonta Sport Costa Masnaga
Sania Copeland	22	Guard	5'7"	Senior	Kansas City, KS	Graduated
Nadira Eltayeb	33	Center	6'4"	Graduate student	Seattle, WA	Graduated
Lilly Meister	52	Forward	6'3"	Senior	Rochester, MN	Graduated

=== Incoming transfers ===
Kansas incoming transfers
Name	Num	Pos.	Height	Year	Hometown	Previous school
Anna Gooden	0	Forward	6'0"	Sophomore	Fort Smith, AR	Colorado
Mariyah Noel	1	Guard	5'11"	Senior	Kansas City, KS	Xavier
Tyara Davis	7	Forward	6'0"	Junior	Kansas City, KS	Harris–Stowe (NAIA)
Mykayla Cunningham	8	Guard	5'10"	Senior	Salina, KS	Southern

=== Recruiting class ===
College recruiting
Name	Hometown	School	Height	Weight	Commit date
Cydnee Bryant; P	Corona, CA	Centennial High School	6 ft 3 in (1.91 m)	N/A	Nov 30, 2025
Cydnee Bryant; P	Recruit ratings: Rivals: 247Sports: ESPN: (96)				
Brooklyn Renn; PF	Sellersburg, IN	Silver Creek High School	6 ft 0 in (1.83 m)	N/A	Sep 30, 2025
Brooklyn Renn; PF	Recruit ratings: Rivals: 247Sports: ESPN: (92)				
Mollie Ernstes; SG	North Vernon, IN	Jennings County High School	6 ft 0 in (1.83 m)	N/A	Oct 1, 2025
Mollie Ernstes; SG	Recruit ratings: 247Sports:				
Overall recruit ranking: ESPN: 20
Note: In many cases, Scout, Rivals, 247Sports, On3, and ESPN may conflict in their listings of height and weight.; In these cases, the average was taken. ESPN grades are on a 100-point scale.; Sources: "2026 Player Commits". ESPN. Archived from the original on October 6, 2025.

== Preseason ==
On October 8, 2026, the Big 12 Conference released its annual preseason coaches poll and awards. Kansas was picked to finish fifth in the conference.

=== Preseason rankings ===
Big 12 Preseason Coaches Poll
Place	Team	Votes
1	Oklahoma State	215 (1)
2	TCU	212 (6)
3	Baylor	199 (2)
4	West Virginia	186 (1)
5	Kansas	160
6	Arizona State	143
7	BYU	137
8	Colorado	126
9	Kansas State	121
10	Texas Tech	103
11	Iowa State	78
12	Utah	77
13	Arizona	55
14	Cincinnati	43
15	Houston	38
16	UCF	27
(#) first-place votes

=== Preseason All-Big 12 Team ===
Preseason All-Big 12 Team
Player	Year	Position
Jaliya Davis	Sophomore	Forward
S'Mya Nichols^{#}	Senior	Guard
^{#} unanimous selection

== Roster ==
2026–27 Kansas Jayhawks women's basketball team
Players
Coaches

Pos.	#	Name	Height	Year	Previous school	Hometown
G	0	Anna Gooden	6 ft 0 in (1.83 m)	So	Northside High School	Fort Smith, AR
G	1	Mariyah Noel	5 ft 11 in (1.8 m)	Sr	Bonner Springs High School; Xavier	Kansas City, KS
G	7	Tyara Davis	6 ft 0 in (1.83 m)	Jr	Blue Valley North High School; Harris–Stowe	Kansas City, KS
G	8	Mykayla Cunningham	5 ft 10 in (1.78 m)	Sr	SPIRE Academy; Southern	Salina, KS
C	11	Cydnee Bryant	6 ft 4 in (1.93 m)	Fr	Centennial High School	Corona, CA
G	12	S'Mya Nichols	6 ft 0 in (1.83 m)	Sr	Shawnee Mission West High School	Overland Park, KS
G	13	Libby Fandel	6 ft 1 in (1.85 m)	So	Xavier High School	Cedar Rapids, IA
F	14	Brooklynn Renn	6 ft 3 in (1.91 m)	Fr	Silver Creek High School	Sellersburg, IN
F	15	Tatyonna Brown	6 ft 2 in (1.88 m)	So	Air Academy High School	Colorado Springs, CO
G	23	Brittany Harshaw	6 ft 1 in (1.85 m)	Sr	Andover Central High School; Creighton	Andover, KS
F	24	Regan Williams	6 ft 3 in (1.91 m)	Jr	Park Hill South High School	Kansas City, MO
F	25	Jaliya Davis	6 ft 2 in (1.88 m)	So	Blue Valley North High School	Overland Park, KS
F	31	Mollie Ernstes	6 ft 0 in (1.83 m)	Fr	Jennings County High School	North Vernon, IN

Head coach

- Brandon Schneider (Wayland Baptist)

Assistant coach(es)

- Brock McGinnis (Ottawa)
- Jerise Freeman (Pacific)
- Patrick Schrater (Kansas)
- Jayci Stone (Kansas State)

Legend

- (C) Team captain
- (S) Suspended
- (I) Ineligible
- (W) Walk-on
- Injured
- Current redshirt

Roster

== Schedule and results ==
Date time, TV	Rank^{#}	Opponent^{#}	Result	Record	High points	High rebounds	High assists	Site (attendance) city, state
Exhibition
October 22, 2026*; 6:30 p.m., ESPN+		Northeastern State	W 90–43		19 – J. Davis	7 – J. Davis	5 – Nichols	Allen Fieldhouse (1,147); Lawrence, KS
October 29, 2026*; 6:30 p.m., ESPN+		Washburn	W 68–50		16 – Fandel	9 – Renn	3 – Nichols	Allen Fieldhouse (1,533); Lawrence, KS
Non-conference regular season
November 3, 2026*; 6:30 p.m., ESPN+		Omaha	W 66–48	1–0	20 – J. Davis	9 – Williams	3 – Nichols	Allen Fieldhouse (2,769); Lawrence, KS
November 6, 2026*; 11:00 a.m., ESPN+		Drake	W 74–49	2–0	20 – J. Davis	9 – J. Davis	4 – Nichols	Allen Fieldhouse (4,751); Lawrence, KS
November 10, 2026*; 6:30 p.m., ESPN+		Oral Roberts	W 99–51	3–0	26 – J. Davis	8 – Fandel	5 – Williams	Allen Fieldhouse (2,951); Lawrence, KS
November 14, 2026*; 3:00 p.m., B1G+		vs. No. 25 Nebraska; MarketBeat Invitational	L 73–105	3–1	21 – J. Davis	5 – Williams	6 – Tied	Sanford Pentagon; Sioux Falls, SD
November 18, 2026*; 7:00 p.m., Peacock/NBCSN		at No. 17 Minnesota	L 58–76	3–2	17 – Nichols	8 – J. Davis	5 – Nichols	The Barn (3,872); Minneapolis, MN
November 22, 2026*; 1:30 p.m., ESPN+		vs. South Dakota State; 28.5 Hoops Women's Invitational						T-Mobile Center; Kansas City, MO
November 26, 2026*; 3:00 p.m., FloSports		vs. Washington State; Cancún Challenge Riviera Tournament						Hard Rock Hotel Riviera Maya; Cancún, Mexico
November 27, 2026*; 5:30 p.m., FloSports		vs. Miami (OH); Cancún Challenge Riviera Tournament						Hard Rock Hotel Riviera Maya; Cancún, Mexico
December 3, 2026*; 6:30 p.m., ESPN+		Missouri State						Allen Fieldhouse; Lawrence, KS
December 6, 2026*; 12:00 p.m., ESPN+		Kansas City						Allen Fieldhouse; Lawrence, KS
December 10, 2026*; 6:30 p.m., ESPN+		North Dakota State						Allen Fieldhouse; Lawrence, KS
December 13, 2026*; 2:00 p.m., ESPN+		Northwestern						Allen Fieldhouse; Lawrence, KS
December 16, 2026*; 6:30 p.m., ESPN+		Lindenwood						Allen Fieldhouse; Lawrence, KS
Big 12 regular season
December 20, 2026; 2:00 p.m., ESPN+		Oklahoma State						Allen Fieldhouse; Lawrence, KS
December 30, 2026; 6:00 p.m., ESPN+		at West Virginia						Hope Coliseum; Morgantown, WV
January 2, 2027; 5:30 p.m., ESPN+		at Cincinnati						Fifth Third Arena; Cincinnati, OH
January 6, 2027; 6:30 p.m., ESPN+		Arizona						Allen Fieldhouse; Lawrence, KS
January 9, 2027; 7:30 p.m., CBSSN		Baylor						Allen Fieldhouse; Lawrence, KS
January 13, 2027; 6:30 p.m., ESPN+		at Oklahoma State						Gallagher-Iba Arena; Stillwater, OK
January 16, 2027; 6:00 p.m., ESPN+		at Utah						Jon M. Huntsman Center; Salt Lake City, UT
January 20, 2027; 6:30 p.m., ESPN+		Iowa State						Allen Fieldhouse; Lawrence, KS
January 24, 2027; 2:00 p.m., ESPN+		at Colorado						CU Events Center; Boulder, CO
January 27, 2027; 6:30 p.m., ESPN+		Arizona State						Allen Fieldhouse; Lawrence, KS
January 31, 2027; 2:00 p.m., ESPN+		Kansas State; Sunflower Showdown						Allen Fieldhouse; Lawrence, KS
February 6, 2027; 3:00 p.m., ESPN+		at BYU						Marriott Center; Provo, UT
February 10, 2027; 8:00 p.m., CBSSN		TCU						Allen Fieldhouse; Lawrence, KS
February 13, 2027; TBA, ESPN+		at Houston						Fertitta Center; Houston, TX
February 16, 2027; 6:30 p.m., ESPN+		UCF						Allen Fieldhouse; Lawrence, KS
February 21, 2027; 5:00 p.m., CBSSN		at Kansas State; Sunflower Showdown						Bramlage Coliseum; Manhattan, KS
February 24, 2027; 6:30 p.m., ESPN+		at Iowa State						Hilton Coliseum; Ames, IA
February 28, 2027; 2:00 p.m., ESPN+		Texas Tech						Allen Fieldhouse; Lawrence, KS
Big 12 tournament
March 3–8, 2027; TBA		vs.						T-Mobile Center; Kansas City, MO
*Non-conference game. ^{#}Rankings from AP Poll. (#) Tournament seedings in parentheses. All times are in Central.

== Rankings ==
Ranking movements Legend: RV = Received votes
	Week																				
Poll	Pre	1	2	3	4	5	6	7	8	9	10	11	12	13	14	15	16	17	18	19	Final
AP	RV																				
Coaches	RV																				

== See also ==
- 2026–27 Kansas Jayhawks men's basketball team
