= 2026–27 Colorado Buffaloes women's basketball team =

American college basketball season

2026–27 Colorado Buffaloes women's basketball
- Conference: Big 12 Conference
- Record: 5–0 (0–0 Big 12)
- Head coach: JR Payne (11th season)
- Associate head coach: Toriano Towns
- Assistant coaches: Taelor Karr; Matt Hower; Jordynn Hernandez; Shelley Sheetz
- Home arena: CU Events Center

2026–27 Big 12 women's basketball standings
	Conf.				Overall
Team	W		L	PCT	W		L	PCT
No. 15 TCU	0	–	0	–	7	–	0	1.000
BYU	0	–	0	–	6	–	0	1.000
Iowa State	0	–	0	–	6	–	0	1.000
Arizona State	0	–	0	–	5	–	0	1.000
Baylor	0	–	0	–	5	–	0	1.000
Colorado	0	–	0	–	5	–	0	1.000
Houston	0	–	0	–	5	–	0	1.000
Utah	0	–	0	–	5	–	0	1.000
No. 22 West Virginia	0	–	0	–	5	–	0	1.000
UCF	0	–	0	–	6	–	1	.857
Kansas State	0	–	0	–	5	–	1	.833
No. 25 Oklahoma State	0	–	0	–	5	–	1	.833
Arizona	0	–	0	–	4	–	1	.800
Cincinnati	0	–	0	–	4	–	1	.800
Texas Tech	0	–	0	–	4	–	1	.800
Kansas	0	–	0	–	3	–	2	.600
† 2027 Big 12 tournament winner As of November 20, 2026; Rankings from AP poll

The 2026–27 Colorado Buffaloes women's basketball team currently represents the University of Colorado Boulder during the 2026–27 NCAA Division I women's basketball season. The Buffaloes, led by eleventh-year head coach JR Payne, play their home games at the CU Events Center in Boulder, Colorado and compete as a member of the Big 12 Conference.

== Previous season ==
The Buffaloes finished the season 22–12 overall and 11–7 in Big 12 play, to finish sixth place in the conference. As the No. 6 seed in the Big 12 tournament, they received a first-round bye, defeating No. 11 Kansas in the second round and No. 3 Baylor in the quarterfinals before losing to tournament champions No. 2 seed West Virginia 47–48 in the semifinals.

Following their tournament loss, the Buffaloes received an at-large bid to the NCAA tournament, seeded No. 10 in the Fort Worth #1 Regional. They fell to No. 7 Illinois in the first round to end their season.

== Offseason ==
=== Departures ===
Colorado departures
Name	Num	Pos.	Height	Year	Hometown	Reason for departure
Erianna Gooden	0	Guard	6'0"	Freshman	Fort Smith, AR	Transferred to Kansas
Desiree Wooten	3	Guard	5'8"	Junior	Dallas, TX	Transferred to NC State
JoJo Nworie	4	Center	6'5"	Junior	Lagos, Nigeria	Transferred to Pacific
Isa Hämäläinen	10	Guard	6'1"	Freshman	Lorentzweiler, Luxembourg	Transferred to San Jose State
Jade Masogayo	14	Forward	6'3"	Senior	Fort Worth, TX	Graduated; went undrafted in the 2026 WNBA draft, signed a training camp contract with the Minnesota Lynx
Anaëlle Dutat	15	Forward	6'0"	Senior	Cesson, France	Graduated
Tabitha Betson	17	Forward	6'2"	Sophomore	Melbourne, Australia	Transferred to Michigan State

=== Incoming transfers ===
Colorado incoming transfers
Name	Num	Pos.	Height	Year	Hometown	Previous school
Brooke Walker	0	Guard	5'8"	Junior	Andover, KS	Utah
Mecailin Marshall	6	Guard	5'10"	Sophomore	Lubbock, TX	Tulane
Anete Adler	20	Center	6'5"	Graduate Student	Keila, Estonia	Boston University
Kira Reynolds	21	Forward	6'2"	Sophomore	South Bend, IN	UT Arlington
Aniya' Foy	15	Guard	5'11"	Sophomore	Katy, TX	Kansas State

=== Recruiting class ===
College recruiting
Name	Hometown	School	Height	Weight	Commit date
Cail Jahnke; G	Minneapolis, MN	St. Michael-Albertville High School	6 ft 2 in (1.88 m)	N/A	Aug 21, 2025
Cail Jahnke; G	Recruit ratings: Rivals:				
Overall recruit ranking:
Note: In many cases, Scout, Rivals, 247Sports, On3, and ESPN may conflict in their listings of height and weight.; In these cases, the average was taken. ESPN grades are on a 100-point scale.; Sources:

== Preseason ==
On October 8, 2026, the Big 12 Conference released its annual preseason coaches poll and awards. Colorado was picked to finish eighth in the conference.

=== Preseason rankings ===
Big 12 Preseason Coaches Poll
Place	Team	Votes
1	Oklahoma State	215 (1)
2	TCU	212 (6)
3	Baylor	199 (2)
4	West Virginia	186 (1)
5	Kansas	160
6	Arizona State	143
7	BYU	137
8	Colorado	126
9	Kansas State	121
10	Texas Tech	103
11	Iowa State	78
12	Utah	77
13	Arizona	55
14	Cincinnati	43
15	Houston	38
16	UCF	27
(#) first-place votes

=== Preseason All-Big 12 Team ===
Preseason All-Big 12 Team
Player	Year	Position
Zyanna Walker	Senior	Guard
^{#} unanimous selection

== Roster ==
2026–27 Colorado Buffaloes women's basketball team
Players
Coaches

Pos.	#	Name	Height	Year	Previous school	Hometown
G	0	Brooke Walker	5 ft 8 in (1.73 m)	Jr	Andover High School; Utah	Andover, KS
G	1	Zyanna Walker	5 ft 11 in (1.8 m)	Sr	Wichita Heights HS; Kansas State	Wichita, KS
G	2	Kennedy Sanders	5 ft 8 in (1.73 m)	RS Jr	Chaska HS	Chaska, MN
G	3	Cail Jahnke	6 ft 2 in (1.88 m)	Fr	St. Michael-Albertville High School	Minneapolis, MN
G	5	Lauren Harris	5 ft 11 in (1.8 m)	Fr	Faith Christian High School	Yuba City, CA
G	6	Mecailin Marshall	5 ft 10 in (1.78 m)	So	Abernathy High School; Tulane	Lubbock, TX
G	7	Claire O'Connor	6 ft 0 in (1.83 m)	Sr	Lakeside School; Gonzaga	Bellevue, WA
C	8	Jade Crook	6 ft 4 in (1.93 m)	So	Australia Centre of Excellence; Lake Ginninderra College	Albury, Australia
F	11	Logyn Greer	6 ft 4 in (1.93 m)	So	Friends' Central School	Lansdowne, PA
G	13	Maeve McErlane	5 ft 10 in (1.78 m)	Sr	Notre Dame; DePaul	Philadelphia, PA
C	20	Anete Adler	6 ft 5 in (1.96 m)	GS	Audentes Sports Gymnasium; Boston University	Keila, Estonia
F	21	Kira Reynolds	6 ft 2 in (1.88 m)	So	Washington High School; UT Arlington	South Bend, IN
F	22	Sophie Zadel	6 ft 4 in (1.93 m)	So	Alamo Heights HS	San Antonio, TX
G	23	Aniya' Foy	5 ft 11 in (1.8 m)	So	Cinco Ranch High School; Kansas State	Katy, TX

Head coach

- JR Payne (Saint Mary's)

Assistant coach(es)

- Toriano Towns (Saint Mary's)
- Taelor Karr (Gonzaga)
- Matt Hower (Colorado State)
- Jordynn Hernandez (UT Arlington)
- Shelley Sheetz (Colorado)

Legend

- (C) Team captain
- (S) Suspended
- (I) Ineligible
- (W) Walk-on
- Injured
- Current redshirt

Roster
Last update: June 26, 2026

== Schedule and results ==
Date time, TV	Rank^{#}	Opponent^{#}	Result	Record	High points	High rebounds	High assists	Site (attendance) city, state
Exhibition
October 27, 2026*; 6:00 p.m.		Adams State	W 100–39		–	–	–	CU Events Center; Boulder, CO
Non-conference regular season
November 4, 2026*; 6:00 p.m., ESPN+		Morgan State	W 83–38	1–0	12 – Greer	7 – Tied (2)	4 – Tied (2)	CU Events Center (1,809); Boulder, CO
November 7, 2026*; 1:00 p.m., ESPN+		Fresno State	W 73–56	2–0	24 – Greer	9 – Greer	5 – Sanders	CU Events Center (1,974); Boulder, CO
November 11, 2026*; 8:00 p.m., YouTube		at San Diego State	W 64–55	3–0	17 – Z. Walker	6 – Z. Walker	3 – Sanders	Viejas Arena (2,427); San Diego, CA
November 14, 2026*; 1:00 p.m., ESPN+		Youngstown State	W 72–63	4–0	14 – Adler	8 – Reynolds	6 – B. Walker	CU Events Center (2,036); Boulder, CO
November 18, 2026*; 7:00 p.m., MW+		at New Mexico	W 75–58	5–0	17 – Marshall	6 – Tied (2)	2 – Tied (2)	The Pit (3,912); Albuquerque, NM
November 26, 2026*; 11:30 a.m., FloSports		vs. Georgia; Cancun Challenge Mayan Tournament						Hard Rock Hotel Riviera Maya; Cancún, Mexico
November 27, 2026*; 9:00 a.m., FloSports		vs. Oregon; Cancun Challenge Mayan Tournament						Hard Rock Hotel Riviera Maya; Cancún, Mexico
November 28, 2026*; 9:00 a.m., FloSports		vs. Maryland Eastern Shore; Cancun Challenge Mayan Tournament						Hard Rock Hotel Riviera Maya; Cancún, Mexico
December 3, 2026*; 6:00 p.m., ESPN+		at Denver						Hamilton Gymnasium; Denver, CO
December 6, 2026*; 1:00 p.m., ESPN+		Wyoming						CU Events Center; Boulder, CO
December 12, 2026*; 4:00 p.m., ESPN+		San Francisco						CU Events Center; Boulder, CO
December 15, 2026*; 4:00 p.m., ESPN+		Utah Tech						CU Events Center; Boulder, CO
Big 12 regular season
December 20, 2026; 12:00 p.m., ESPN+		at Texas Tech						United Supermarkets Arena; Lubbock, TX
December 30, 2026; 6:00 p.m., ESPN+		Arizona State						CU Events Center; Boulder, CO
January 2, 2027; 4:00 p.m., CBSSN		Baylor						CU Events Center; Boulder, CO
January 6, 2027; 5:30 p.m., ESPN+		at Oklahoma State						Gallagher-Iba Arena; Stillwater, OK
January 9, 2027; 6:00 p.m., ESPN+		UCF						CU Events Center; Boulder, CO
January 13, 2027; 6:00 p.m., ESPN+		BYU						CU Events Center; Boulder, CO
January 17, 2026; 12:00 p.m., ESPN+		at Cincinnati						Fifth Third Arena; Cincinnati, OH
January 20, 2027; 5:00 p.m., ESPN+		at West Virginia						Hope Coliseum; Morgantown, WV
January 24, 2027; 1:00 p.m., ESPN+		Kansas						CU Events Center; Boulder, CO
January 31, 2027; 12:00 p.m., ESPN2		at TCU						Schollmaier Arena; Fort Worth, TX
February 3, 2027; 6:00 p.m., ESPN+		Houston						CU Events Center; Boulder, CO
February 6, 2027; 1:00 p.m., ESPN+		at Iowa State						Hilton Coliseum; Ames, IA
February 10, 2027; 8:30 p.m., FS1		Oklahoma State						CU Events Center; Boulder, CO
February 13, 2027; 5:00 p.m., ESPN+		at Utah						Jon M. Huntsman Center; Salt Lake City, UT
February 16, 2027; 7:00 p.m., ESPN+		at BYU						Marriott Center; Provo, UT
February 20, 2027; 1:00 p.m., ESPN+		Arizona						CU Events Center; Boulder, CO
February 24, 2027; 6:30 p.m., ESPN+		at Arizona State						Desert Financial Arena; Tempe, AZ
February 28, 2027; 1:00 p.m., ESPN+		Kansas State						CU Events Center; Boulder, CO
Big 12 tournament
March 3–8, 2027; TBA		vs.						T-Mobile Center; Kansas City, MO
*Non-conference game. ^{#}Rankings from AP Poll. (#) Tournament seedings in parentheses. All times are in Central.
