= Whitney Young High School =

Whitney Young High School may refer to the following schools in the United States:

- Whitney M. Young Magnet High School in Chicago
- Whitney M. Young Gifted & Talented Leadership Academy in Cleveland
