= 2026–27 Denver Pioneers women's basketball team =

American college basketball season

2026–27 Denver Pioneers women's basketball
- Conference: West Coast Conference
- Record: 1–4 (0–0 WCC)
- Head coach: Erik Johnson (1st in 2nd stint, 5th overall season)
- Associate head coach: Abi Olajuwon
- Assistant coaches: Jasmine Gill; Des Abeyta; Amari Boyd
- Home arena: Hamilton Gymnasium

2026–27 West Coast Conference women's basketball standings
	Conf.				Overall
Team	W		L	PCT	W		L	PCT
Loyola Marymount	0	–	0	–	3	–	0	1.000
Santa Clara	0	–	0	–	3	–	0	1.000
Pepperdine	0	–	0	–	2	–	1	.667
San Diego	0	–	0	–	2	–	1	.667
San Francisco	0	–	0	–	2	–	1	.667
Portland	0	–	0	–	2	–	2	.500
Seattle	0	–	0	–	2	–	2	.500
Pacific	0	–	0	–	1	–	1	.500
Saint Mary's	0	–	0	–	1	–	2	.333
Denver	0	–	0	–	1	–	3	.250
† 2027 WCC tournament winner As of November 14, 2026

The 2026–27 Denver Pioneers women's basketball team currently represents the University of Denver during the 2026–27 NCAA Division I women's basketball season. The Pioneers, led by first-year head coach Erik Johnson, play their home games at Hamilton Gymnasium in Denver, Colorado as members of the West Coast Conference.

This is Denver's first season as members of the West Coast Conference, joining the conference on July 1, 2026, after previously competing as part of the Summit League.

== Previous season ==
The Pioneers finished the 2025–26 season 11–19, 5–11 in Summit League play, to finish in sixth place. They were defeated by South Dakota in the quarterfinals of the Summit League tournament.

== Offseason ==
=== Departures ===
Denver departures
Name	Num	Pos.	Height	Year	Hometown	Reason for departure
Laila McLeod	1	Forward	6'0"	Senior	Dallas, TX	Transferred to Barry University
Natalia Fanjul	8	Forward	5'10"	Freshman	Altafulla, Spain	Transferred to Arkansas–Fort Smith
Teodora Simoncevic	9	Power Forward	6'2"	Freshman	Ivanjica, Serbia	Transferred to Florida Southern
Coryn Watts	10	Guard	5'7"	Sophomore	Aurora, CO	Transferred to UC San Diego
Jocelyn Medina	15	Guard	5'6"	Junior	Arbuckle, CA	Transferred to Gonzaga
Paula Oliva	22	Forward	6'0"	Freshman	Salamanca, Spain	Entered Transfer Portal

=== Incoming transfers ===
Denver incoming transfers
Name	Num	Pos.	Height	Year	Hometown	Previous school
Mallory McQuietor	21	Forward	6'3"	Senior	Keller, TX	Incarnate Word

=== Recruiting class ===
College recruiting
Name	Hometown	School	Height	Weight	Commit date
Safiyah Sugapong; G	San Diego, CA	La Jolla Country Day	5 ft 5 in (1.65 m)	N/A	May 4, 2026
Safiyah Sugapong; G	Recruit ratings: No ratings found				
Emma Hart; G	Houston, TX	IMG Academy National Team	5 ft 6 in (1.68 m)	N/A	May 18, 2026
Emma Hart; G	Recruit ratings: No ratings found				
Overall recruit ranking:
Note: In many cases, Scout, Rivals, 247Sports, On3, and ESPN may conflict in their listings of height and weight.; In these cases, the average was taken. ESPN grades are on a 100-point scale.; Sources:

== Roster ==
2026–27 Denver Pioneers women's basketball team
Players
Coaches

Pos.	#	Name	Height	Year	Previous school	Hometown
F	0	Brooke Murrell	6 ft 3 in (1.91 m)	Sr	Hawai'i	Aurora, Colorado
G	1	Safiyah Sugapong	5 ft 5 in (1.65 m)	Fr	La Jolla Country Day	San Diego, California
G	2	Lexi Pletschette	5 ft 9 in (1.75 m)	Sr	Chabot College	Livermore, California
G	3	Tori Baker	5 ft 7 in (1.7 m)	So	Highlands Ranch High School	Highlands Ranch, Colorado
F	5	Anna Rosenberger	6 ft 3 in (1.91 m)	Jr	Glenbrook South High School	Glenview, Illinois
G	11	Karolina Padilla	5 ft 7 in (1.7 m)	Sr	Cochise College	Douglas, Arizona
G	12	Laia Monclova	6 ft 1 in (1.85 m)	Sr	La Salle	Mallorca, Spain
F	13	Ana Conde	6 ft 0 in (1.83 m)	Jr	Siena	Madrid, Spain
F	21	Mallory McQuietor	6 ft 3 in (1.91 m)	Sr	Incarnate Word	Keller, Texas
G	22	Emma Hart	5 ft 6 in (1.68 m)	Fr	IMG Academy National Team	Houston, Texas
F	32	Lily Esparza	6 ft 2 in (1.88 m)	Jr	Boylan Catholic High School	Rockford, Illinois

Head coach

- Erik Johnson (UC San Diego)

Assistant coach(es)

- Abi Olajuwon (Oklahoma)
- Jasmine Gill (James Madison)
- Des Abeyta (UC Davis)
- Amari Boyd (Penn State)

Legend

- (C) Team captain
- (S) Suspended
- (I) Ineligible
- (W) Walk-on
- Injured
- Current redshirt

Roster
Last update: November 12, 2026

== Schedule and results ==
Date time, TV	Rank^{#}	Opponent^{#}	Result	Record	High points	High rebounds	High assists	Site (attendance) city, state
Non-conference regular season
November 2, 2026*; 6:30 pm, MW+		at Air Force	L 45–66	0–1	16 – Padilla	9 – Murrell	3 – Sugapong	Clune Arena (623); Air Force Academy, CO
November 4, 2026*; 6:00 pm, ESPN+		Lindenwood	W 66–52	1–1	23 – Baker	11 – Monclova	3 – Tied (2)	Hamilton Gymnasium (368); Denver, CO
November 7, 2026*; 4:00 pm, ESPN+		at Weber State	L 51–64	1–2	18 – Baker	11 – Murrell	3 – Baker	Dee Events Center (546); Ogden, UT
November 10, 2026*; 6:00 pm, ESPN+		Colorado State	L 50–86	1–3	20 – Murrell	10 – Murrell	6 – Monclova	Hamilton Gymnasium (602); Denver, CO
November 13, 2026*; 5:00 pm, SECN+		at No. 9 LSU	L 37–101	1–4	16 – Baker	5 – Murrell	3 – Baker	Maravich Center (9,134); Baton Rouge, LA
November 16, 2026*; 5:00 pm, ESPN+		Regis						Hamilton Gymnasium; Denver, CO
November 24, 2026*; 2:00 pm, ESPN+		Northern Colorado						Hamilton Gymnasium; Denver, CO
November 30, 2026*; 6:00 pm, ESPN+		Colorado Christian						Hamilton Gymnasium; Denver, CO
December 3, 2026*; 6:00 pm, ESPN+		Colorado						Hamilton Gymnasium; Denver, CO
December 6, 2026*; 2:00 pm, ESPN+		at Utah						Jon M. Huntsman Center; Salt Lake City, UT
December 9, 2026*; 6:00 pm, ESPN+		Nevada						Hamilton Gymnasium; Denver, CO
December 13, 2026*; 3:00 pm, ESPN+		at Cal State Fullerton						Titan Gym; Fullerton, CA
December 17, 2026*; 6:00 pm, SLN		at Kansas City						Swinney Center; Kansas City, MO
December 22, 2026*; 1:00 pm, ESPN+		Wyoming						Hamilton Gymnasium; Denver, CO
West Coast Conference regular season
December 31, 2026; 2:00 pm, ESPN+		Santa Clara						Hamilton Gymnasium; Denver, CO
January 2, 2027; 2:00 pm, ESPN+		Pacific						Hamilton Gymnasium; Denver, CO
January 7, 2027; 7:00 pm, ESPN+		at Seattle						Redhawk Center; Seattle, WA
January 9, 2027; 6:00 pm, ESPN+		at Portland						Chiles Center; Portland, OR
January 14, 2027; 6:00 pm, ESPN+		Pepperdine						Hamilton Gymnasium; Denver, CO
January 16, 2027; 1:00 pm, ESPN+		San Diego						Hamilton Gymnasium; Denver, CO
January 21, 2027; 8:00 pm, ESPN+		at Santa Clara						Leavey Center; Santa Clara, CA
January 23, 2027; TBA, ESPN+		at Saint Mary's						University Credit Union Pavilion; Moraga, CA
January 28, 2027; 6:00 pm, ESPN+		Seattle						Hamilton Gymnasium; Denver, CO
January 30, 2027; 12:00 pm, ESPN+		Portland						Hamilton Gymnasium; Denver, CO
February 4, 2027; 7:00 pm, ESPN+		at Loyola Marymount						Gersten Pavilion; Los Angeles, CA
February 6, 2027; 3:00 pm, ESPN+		at San Diego						Jenny Craig Pavilion; San Diego, CA
February 11, 2027; 12:00 pm, ESPN+		at Pepperdine						The Mountain at Mullin Park; Malibu, CA
February 13, 2027; 2:00 pm, ESPN+		San Francisco						Hamilton Gymnasium; Denver, CO
February 18, 2027; 6:00 pm, ESPN+		Loyola Marymount						Hamilton Gymnasium; Denver, CO
February 20, 2027; 5:00 pm, ESPN+		at Pacific						Alex G. Spanos Center; Stockton, CA
February 25, 2027; 6:00 pm, ESPN+		Saint Mary's						Hamilton Gymnasium; Denver, CO
February 27, 2027; 2:00 pm, ESPN+		at San Francisco						War Memorial at The Sobrato Center; San Francisco, CA
West Coast Conference tournament
March 5–9, 2027; TBA		vs.						Orleans Arena; Las Vegas, NV
*Non-conference game. ^{#}Rankings from AP Poll. (#) Tournament seedings in parentheses. All times are in Mountain.
