= 2026–27 Oklahoma State Cowgirls basketball team =

American college basketball season

2026–27 Oklahoma State Cowgirls basketball
- Conference: Big 12 Conference

Ranking
- Coaches: No. 25
- AP: No. 25
- Record: 6–1 (0–0 Big 12)
- Head coach: Jacie Hoyt (5th season)
- Assistant coaches: Kelby Jones; Mandi Carver; Durmon Jennings; Robyne Bostick; Terran Hoyt
- Home arena: Gallagher-Iba Arena

2026–27 Big 12 women's basketball standings
	Conf.				Overall
Team	W		L	PCT	W		L	PCT
No. 15 TCU	0	–	0	–	7	–	0	1.000
Arizona State	0	–	0	–	6	–	0	1.000
BYU	0	–	0	–	6	–	0	1.000
Iowa State	0	–	0	–	6	–	0	1.000
Utah	0	–	0	–	6	–	0	1.000
Colorado	0	–	0	–	5	–	0	1.000
Houston	0	–	0	–	5	–	0	1.000
No. 22 West Virginia	0	–	0	–	5	–	0	1.000
No. 25 Oklahoma State	0	–	0	–	6	–	1	.857
UCF	0	–	0	–	6	–	1	.857
Baylor	0	–	0	–	5	–	1	.833
Kansas State	0	–	0	–	5	–	1	.833
Arizona	0	–	0	–	4	–	1	.800
Cincinnati	0	–	0	–	4	–	1	.800
Texas Tech	0	–	0	–	4	–	1	.800
Kansas	0	–	0	–	3	–	2	.600
† 2027 Big 12 tournament winner As of November 21, 2026; Rankings from AP poll

The 2026–27 Oklahoma State Cowgirls basketball team currently represents Oklahoma State University during the 2026–27 NCAA Division I women's basketball season. The Cowgirls, led by fifth-year head coach Jacie Hoyt, play their home games at the Gallagher-Iba Arena in Stillwater, Oklahoma and compete as a member of the Big 12 Conference.

== Previous season ==
The Cowgirls finished the 2025–26 season 24–10 overall and 12–6 in Big 12 play, to finish in a tie for fourth in the conference with Texas Tech. As the No. 4 seed in the Big 12 tournament, they earned a double-bye to the quarterfinals, where they were upset in a 73–74 loss to No. 12 Kansas State.

Following their tournament elimination, the Cowgirls earned an at-large bid to the NCAA tournament, where they were seeded No. 8 in the Sacramento #2 Regional. They defeated No. 9 Princeton in the first round before losing 68–87 to eventual NCAA champions, top-seeded UCLA, in the second round to end their season.

On May 11, 2026, it was announced that three-star guard Braelyn Peck had requested to be released from her commitment to Oklahoma State, and flipped her commitment to play for Division II Midwestern State.

== Offseason ==
=== Departures ===
Oklahoma State Departures
Name	Num	Pos.	Height	Year	Hometown	Reason for Departure
Amari Whiting	1	Guard	5'10"	Junior	Burley, ID	Transferred to Iowa
Lena Girardi	2	Guard	5'11"	Freshman	Purchase, NY	Transferred to Utah
Micah Gray	3	Guard	5'8"	Senior	Overland Park, KS	Graduated
Jadyn Wooten	6	Guard	5'6"	Sophomore	Overland Park, KS	Transferred to TCU
Favour Onoh	10	Center	6'5"	Sophomore	Enugu, Nigeria	Transferred to Weber State
Achol Akot	11	Forward	6'1"	Junior	Ottawa, ON	Transferred to North Carolina
Haleigh Timmer	13	Guard	5'11"	Senior	Rapid City, SD	Graduated
Macey Huard	22	Guard	6'2"	Junior	Highlands Ranch, CO	Transferred to Washington (Note: Did not play in the 2025–26 season due to season-ending foot surgery.)
Praise Egharevba	24	Forward	6'3"	(redshirt) Junior	Papenburg, Germany	Transferred to UTSA
Tyla Heard	33	Guard	5'11"	Sophomore	Sapulpa, OK	Transferred to Akron
Wilnie Joseph	35	Center	6'5"	5th Year	Atlanta, GA	Exhausted eligibility
Faith Acker	55	Center	6'2"	Junior	Winnsboro, TX	Transferred to Stephen F. Austin

=== Incoming transfers ===
Oklahoma State incoming transfers
Name	Num	Pos.	Height	Year	Hometown	Previous School
LA Sneed	2	Guard	5'6"	Sophomore	San Antonio, TX	Utah
Ellie Brueggemann	4	Guard	5'11"	Senior	Owasso, OK	Lindenwood
Yuting Deng	9	Guard	6'2"	Junior	Hunan, China	Baylor
Nene Ndiaye	10	Guard	6'1"	Senior	Saly, Senegal	Rutgers
Callin Hake	14	Guard	5'8"	5th Year	Victoria, MN	Nebraska (Note: As part of an ongoing lawsuit challenging the new NCAA age-based eligibility model which excluded the class of 2022, Hake was granted an additional year of eligibility from a temporary restraining order filed in California.)
Zoe Canfield	15	Guard	5'11"	Junior	Topeka, KS	Missouri State
Talexa Weeter	22	Guard	6'0"	Senior	Goodland, KS	Fort Hays State (D-II)
Liv McGill	23	Guard	5'9"	Junior	Minneapolis, MN	Florida
Audi Crooks	55	Center	6'3"	Senior	Algona, IA	Iowa State

=== Recruiting class ===
There was no 2026 recruiting class.

== Preseason ==
On October 8, 2026, the Big 12 Conference released its annual preseason coaches poll and awards. Oklahoma State was picked to finish first in the conference, along with seven first place votes.

=== Preseason rankings ===
Big 12 Preseason Coaches Poll
Place	Team	Votes
1	Oklahoma State	215 (7)
2	TCU	212 (6)
3	Baylor	199 (2)
4	West Virginia	186 (1)
5	Kansas	160
6	Arizona State	143
7	BYU	137
8	Colorado	126
9	Kansas State	121
10	Texas Tech	103
11	Iowa State	78
12	Utah	77
13	Arizona	55
14	Cincinnati	43
15	Houston	38
16	UCF	27
(#) first-place votes

=== Preseason All-Big 12 Team ===
Preseason All-Big 12 Team
Player	Year	Position
Audi Crooks^{#}	Senior	Center
Liv McGill	Junior	Guard
^{#} unanimous selection

=== Other awards ===
Other awards
Player	Year	Position	Award won
Audi Crooks	Senior	Center	Preseason Player of the Year
Liv McGill	Junior	Guard	Preseason Newcomer of the Year

== Roster ==
Years are listed according to the new NCAA age-based eligibility model.

2026–27 Oklahoma State Cowgirls women's basketball team
Players
Coaches

Pos.	#	Name	Height	Year	Previous school	Hometown
G	2	LA Sneed	5 ft 6 in (1.68 m)	Sr	Karen Wagner High School; Utah	San Antonio, TX
C	3	Mojca Jelenc	6 ft 7 in (2.01 m)	Fr	Valencia Basket	Zelezniki, Slovenia
G	4	Ellie Brueggemann	5 ft 11 in (1.8 m)	Sr	Lincoln Christian School; Lindenwood	Owasso, OK
G	9	Yuting Deng	6 ft 2 in (1.88 m)	Jr	Yali High School; Baylor	Hunan, China
G	10	Nene Ndiaye	6 ft 1 in (1.85 m)	Sr	Orangewood Academy; Rutgers	Saly, Senegal
G	14	Callin Hake (5th)	5 ft 8 in (1.73 m)	Sr	Chanhassen High School; Nebraska	Topeka, KS
G	15	Zoe Canfield	5 ft 11 in (1.8 m)	Jr	Washburn Rural High School; Missouri State	Topeka, KS
G	22	Talexa Weeter	6 ft 0 in (1.83 m)	Sr	Goodland High School; Fort Hays State	Goodland, KS
G	23	Liv McGill	5 ft 9 in (1.75 m)	Jr	Hopkins High School; Florida	Minneapolis, MN
G	24	Addisyn Bollinger	5 ft 11 in (1.8 m)	Fr	Frenship High School	Lubbock, TX
G	32	Stailee Heard	5 ft 11 in (1.8 m)	Sr	Sapulpa High School	Sapulpa, OK
C	55	Audi Crooks	6 ft 3 in (1.91 m)	Sr	Bishop Garrigan High School; Iowa State	Algona, IA

Head coach

- Jacie Hoyt (Wichita State)

Assistant coach(es)

- Kelby Jones (North Texas)
- Mandi Carver (Idaho State)
- Durmon Jennings (Indianapolis)
- Robyne Bostick (Saint Joseph's)
- Terran Hoyt (Nebraska–Kearney)

Legend

- (C) Team captain
- (S) Suspended
- (I) Ineligible
- (W) Walk-on
- (5th) Fifth year senior
- Injured
- Current redshirt

Roster
Last update: August 3, 2026

== Schedule and results ==
Date time, TV	Rank^{#}	Opponent^{#}	Result	Record	High points	High rebounds	High assists	Site (attendance) city, state
Exhibition
October 27, 2026*; 6:30 p.m.	No. 22	Langston	W 117–44		20 – Deng	13 – Crooks	10 – Sneed	Gallagher-Iba Arena (2,336); Stillwater, OK
Non-conference regular season
November 2, 2026*; 5:00 p.m., ESPN+	No. 22	Southern	W 81–39	1–0	22 – Crooks	12 – Deng	5 – McGill	Gallagher-Iba Arena (4,576); Stillwater, OK
November 6, 2026*; 5:00 p.m., ESPN+	No. 22	Morgan State	W 92–38	2–0	24 – McGill	11 – Crooks	8 – McGill	Gallagher-Iba Arena; Stillwater, OK
November 9, 2026*; 11:00 a.m., ESPN+	No. 19т	Northwestern State	W 94–56	3–0	23 – McGill	7 – Deng	8 – Heard	Gallagher-Iba Arena (3,976); Stillwater, OK
November 12, 2026*; 5:00 p.m., ESPNU	No. 19т	at Tulsa	L 62–64 ^{OT}	3–1	17 – Crooks	15 – Heard	9 – McGill	Reynolds Center (2,101); Tulsa, OK
November 15, 2026*; 2:00 p.m., CBSSN	No. 19т	at South Dakota State	W 90–80	4–1	34 – McGill	8 – Heard	7 – McGill	First Bank and Trust Arena (2,689); Brookings, SD
November 18, 2026*; 6:30 p.m., ESPN+	No. 25	St. John's	W 77–63	5–1	30 – McGill	7 – Tied	6 – McGill	Gallagher-Iba Arena (2,674); Stillwater, OK
November 20, 2026*; 6:30 p.m., ESPN+	No. 25	Little Rock	W 103–61	6–1	20 – Crooks	9 – Heard	7 – McGill	Gallagher-Iba Arena (2,625); Stillwater, OK
November 22, 2026*; 4:00 p.m.	No. 25	vs. Wichita State; 28.5 Hoops Women's Invitational						T-Mobile Center; Kansas City, MO
November 27, 2026*; 12:30 p.m., BDG Live		vs. Washington; Coconut Hoops Blue Heron Division						Alico Arena; Fort Myers, FL
November 29, 2026*; 12:30 p.m., BDG Live		vs. UMass; Coconut Hoops Blue Heron Division						Alico Arena; Fort Myers, FL
December 1, 2026*; 6:30 p.m., ESPN+		Oral Roberts						Gallagher-Iba Arena; Stillwater, OK
December 6, 2026*; 3:00 p.m., ABC		at South Carolina						Colonial Life Arena; Columbia, SC
December 12, 2026*; 11:00 a.m., ESPN2		vs. Oklahoma; Bedlam Series						Paycom Center; Oklahoma City, OK
December 14, 2026*; 6:30 p.m., ESPN+		North Texas						Gallagher-Iba Arena; Stillwater, OK
Big 12 regular season
December 20, 2026; 2:00 p.m., ESPN+		at Kansas						Allen Fieldhouse; Lawrence, KS
December 30, 2026; 6:30 p.m., ESPN+		Arizona						Gallagher-Iba Arena; Stillwater, OK
January 3, 2027; 7:00 p.m., ESPN2		West Virginia						Gallagher-Iba Arena; Stillwater, OK
January 6, 2027; 6:30 p.m., ESPN+		Colorado						Gallagher-Iba Arena; Stillwater, OK
January 9, 2027; 7:00 p.m., FS1		at Iowa State						Hilton Coliseum; Ames, IA
January 13, 2027; 6:30 p.m., ESPN+		Kansas						Gallagher-Iba Arena; Stillwater, OK
January 16, 2027; 1:00 p.m., CBSSN		at BYU						Marriott Center; Provo, UT
January 19, 2027; 8:00 p.m., ESPN+		at Utah						Jon M. Huntsman Center; Salt Lake City, UT
January 23, 2027; 6:30 p.m., ESPN+		Cincinnati						Gallagher-Iba Arena; Stillwater, OK
January 28, 2027; 7:00 p.m., ESPN		TCU						Gallagher-Iba Arena; Stillwater, OK
January 31, 2027; 2:00 p.m., ESPN+		at Houston						Fertitta Center; Houston, TX
February 4, 2027; 5:30 p.m., ESPN+		at UCF						Addition Financial Arena; Orlando, FL
February 7, 2027; 5:00 p.m., ESPN		Arizona State						Gallagher-Iba Arena; Stillwater, OK
February 10, 2027; 9:30 p.m., FS1		at Colorado						CU Events Center; Boulder, CO
February 15, 2027; 12:00 p.m., FOX		Kansas State						Gallagher-Iba Arena; Stillwater, OK
February 21, 2027; 3:00 p.m., ESPN/ESPN2		at Baylor						Foster Pavilion; Waco, TX
February 24, 2027; 5:30 p.m., CBSSN		at Texas Tech						United Supermarkets Arena; Lubbock, TX
February 27, 2027; 1:30 p.m., FS1		Iowa State						Gallagher-Iba Arena; Stillwater, OK
Big 12 tournament
March 3–7, 2027; TBA		vs.						T-Mobile Center; Kansas City, MO
*Non-conference game. ^{#}Rankings from AP Poll. (#) Tournament seedings in parentheses. All times are in Central.

== Rankings ==
Ranking movements Legend: ██ Increase in ranking ██ Decrease in ranking т = Tied with team above or below
	Week																				
Poll	Pre	1	2	3	4	5	6	7	8	9	10	11	12	13	14	15	16	17	18	19	Final
AP	22	19т	25																		
Coaches	19	20	25																		
