= 2026–27 TCU Horned Frogs women's basketball team =

American college basketball season

2026–27 TCU Horned Frogs women's basketball
- Conference: Big 12 Conference

Ranking
- Coaches: No. 15
- AP: No. 15
- Record: 7–0 (0–0 Big 12)
- Head coach: Mark Campbell (4th season)
- Associate head coach: Xavier Lopez
- Assistant coaches: Charity Elliot; Nolan Wilson; Ruthy Hebard
- Home arena: Schollmaier Arena

2026–27 Big 12 women's basketball standings
	Conf.				Overall
Team	W		L	PCT	W		L	PCT
No. 15 TCU	0	–	0	–	6	–	0	1.000
Arizona State	0	–	0	–	5	–	0	1.000
Baylor	0	–	0	–	5	–	0	1.000
BYU	0	–	0	–	5	–	0	1.000
Houston	0	–	0	–	5	–	0	1.000
Iowa State	0	–	0	–	5	–	0	1.000
Utah	0	–	0	–	5	–	0	1.000
No. 22 West Virginia	0	–	0	–	5	–	0	1.000
Colorado	0	–	0	–	4	–	0	1.000
Texas Tech	0	–	0	–	4	–	0	1.000
Kansas State	0	–	0	–	5	–	1	.833
UCF	0	–	0	–	5	–	1	.833
No. 25 Oklahoma State	0	–	0	–	4	–	1	.800
Arizona	0	–	0	–	3	–	1	.750
Cincinnati	0	–	0	–	3	–	1	.750
Kansas	0	–	0	–	3	–	1	.750
† 2027 Big 12 tournament winner As of November 19, 2026; Rankings from AP poll

The 2026–27 TCU Horned Frogs women's basketball team currently represents Texas Christian University during the 2026–27 NCAA Division I women's basketball season. The Horned Frogs, led by fourth-year head coach Mark Campbell, play their home games at the Schollmaier Arena in Fort Worth, Texas, and compete as a member of the Big 12 Conference.

== Previous season ==
The Horned Frogs finished the 2025–26 season 32–6 overall and 15–3 in Big 12 play, to finish as Big 12 regular season champions for the second consecutive season, as well as with their second consecutive 30-win season. As the top seed in the Big 12 tournament, they earned a double-bye to the quarterfinals, where they defeated No. 9 BYU and No. 12 Kansas State in the semifinals respectively, before falling to No. 2 West Virginia in the championship game 53–62.

Following the loss, the Horned Frogs earned an at-large bid to the NCAA tournament, where they were seeded No. 3 in the Sacramento #4 Regional. They defeated No. 14 UC San Diego in the first round No. 6 Wildcats in overtime in the second round and No. 10 Virginia in the Sweet Sixteen, before falling to eventual tournament runners-up, top-seeded South Carolina in the Elite 8 to end their season.

== Offseason ==
=== Departures ===
TCU departures
Name	Num	Pos.	Height	Year	Hometown	Reason for departure
Kennedy Basham	0	Center	6'7"	Senior	Phoenix, AZ	Graduated
Taylor Bigby	1	Guard	6'1"	Senior	Las Vegas, NV	Graduated; drafted 37th overall by the Portland Fire in the 2026 WNBA draft
Veronica Sheffey	2	Guard	5'9"	Senior	Woodinville, WA	Graduated
Donovyn Hunter	4	Guard	6'0"	Junior	Medford, OR	Transferred to UCLA
Olivia Miles	5	Guard	5'10"	Graduate student	Phillipsburg, NJ	Graduated; drafted 2nd overall by the Minnesota Lynx in the 2026 WNBA draft
Marta Suárez	7	Forward	6'3"	Graduate student	Oviedo, Spain	Graduated; drafted 13th overall by the Seattle Storm in the 2026 WNBA draft
Natalie Mazurek	14	Forward	6'2"	Graduate student	Eden Prairie, MN	Graduated
Taliyah Parker	21	Guard	6'1"	Sophomore	Oklahoma City, OK	Transferred to Florida
Maddie Scherr	22	Guard	5'10"	Graduate student	Florence, KY	Graduated
Aaliyah Roberson	23	Forward	6'2"	Senior	San Antonio, TX	Transferred to Alabama (Note: Did not play in the 2025–26 season due to a torn ACL.)
Emily Hunter	44	Center	6'7"	Freshman	Nolensville, TN	Transferred to UTSA

=== Incoming transfers ===
TCU incoming transfers
Name	Num	Pos.	Height	Year	Hometown	Previous school
Camille Williams	0	Guard	5'11"	Freshman	Fort Worth, TX	Miami (FL)
Avery Hjelmstad	1	Guard	6'1"	Sophomore	Edmond, OK	Utah
Bella Hines	3	Guard	5'10"	Sophomore	Albuquerque, NM	LSU
Jadyn Wooten	6	Guard	5'6"	Junior	Overland Park, KS	Oklahoma State
Lanie Grant	11	Guard	5'9"	Junior	Midlothian, VA	North Carolina
Lara Somfai	12	Forward	6'3"	Sophomore	Mór, Hungary	Stanford

=== Recruiting class ===
There was no recruiting class for 2026.

== Preseason ==
On October 8, 2026, the Big 12 Conference released its annual preseason coaches poll and awards. TCU was picked to finish second in the conference, along with six first place votes.

=== Preseason rankings ===
Big 12 Preseason Coaches Poll
Place	Team	Votes
1	Oklahoma State	215 (1)
2	TCU	212 (6)
3	Baylor	199 (2)
4	West Virginia	186 (1)
5	Kansas	160
6	Arizona State	143
7	BYU	137
8	Colorado	126
9	Kansas State	121
10	Texas Tech	103
11	Iowa State	78
12	Utah	77
13	Arizona	55
14	Cincinnati	43
15	Houston	38
16	UCF	27
(#) first-place votes

=== Preseason All-Big 12 Team ===
Preseason All-Big 12 Team
Player	Year	Position
Clara Silva	Junior	Center
^{#} unanimous selection

=== Other awards ===
Other awards
Player	Year	Position	Award won
Jessie-May Hall	Freshman	Guard	Preseason Freshman of the Year

== Roster ==
2026–27 TCU Horned Frogs women's basketball team
Players
Coaches

Pos.	#	Name	Height	Year	Previous school	Hometown
G	0	Camille Williams	5 ft 11 in (1.8 m)	Fr	Boswell High School; Miami (FL)	Fort Worth, TX
G	1	Avery Hjelmstad	6 ft 1 in (1.85 m)	So	Edmond Memorial High School; Utah	Edmond, OK
G	3	Bella Hines	5 ft 10 in (1.78 m)	So	Eldorado High School; LSU	Albuquerque, NM
G	6	Jadyn Wooten	5 ft 6 in (1.68 m)	Jr	Blue Valley High School; Oklahoma State	Overland Park, KS
G	7	Jessie-May Hall	5 ft 8 in (1.73 m)	Fr	Barker College	Sydney, Australia
G	11	Lanie Grant	5 ft 9 in (1.75 m)	Jr	James River High School; North Carolina	Midlothian, VA
F	12	Lara Somfai	6 ft 3 in (1.91 m)	So	IMG Academy; Stanford	Mór, Hungary
C	15	Sarah Portlock	6 ft 8 in (2.03 m)	RS Fr	Centre of Excellence	Victoria, Australia
G	16	Clara Bielefeld	6 ft 4 in (1.93 m)	So	Citybasket Recklinghausen	Recklinghausen, Germany
C	17	Clara Silva	6 ft 7 in (2.01 m)	Jr	Escola Secundária de Fonseca Benevides; Kentucky	Faro, Portugal
C	18	Laura Vilcinskas	6 ft 5 in (1.96 m)	Fr		De Pinte, Belgium
G	23	Claudia Contell	5 ft 10 in (1.78 m)	Sr		Valencia, Spain

Head coach

- Mark Campbell (Hawaiʻi)

Assistant coach(es)

- Xavier López (Point Loma)
- Charity Elliot (Southwest Missouri)
- Nolan Wilson (Prairie View A&M)
- Ruthy Hebard (Oregon)

Legend

- (C) Team captain
- (S) Suspended
- (I) Ineligible
- (W) Walk-on
- Injured
- Current redshirt

Roster
Last update: July 26, 2026

== Schedule and results ==
Date time, TV	Rank^{#}	Opponent^{#}	Result	Record	High points	High rebounds	High assists	Site (attendance) city, state
Non-conference regular season
November 3, 2026*; 6:30 p.m., ESPN+	No. 15	Oral Roberts	W 99–43	1–0	17 – Somfai	10 – Somfai	8 – Wooten	Schollmaier Arena (2,403); Fort Worth, TX
November 5, 2026*; 6:30 p.m., ESPN+	No. 15	Le Moyne	W 96–41	2–0	19 – Somfai	10 – Vilcinskas	6 – Hines	Schollmaier Arena (2,236); Fort Worth, TX
November 8, 2026*; 2:00 p.m., ESPN+	No. 15	Tarleton State	W 89–42	3–0	15 – Silva	9 – Somfai	6 – Wooten	Schollmaier Arena (2,855); Fort Worth, TX
November 10, 2026*; 4:00 p.m., ESPN+	No. 15	Iona	W 78–53	4–0	19 – Wooten	14 – Somfai	5 – Hines	Schollmaier Arena (2,118); Fort Worth, TX
November 12, 2026*; 6:30 p.m., ESPN+	No. 15	Southeastern Louisiana	W 106–47	5–0	20 – Silva	9 – Somfai	10 – Wooten	Schollmaier Arena (2,202); Fort Worth, TX
November 15, 2026*; 2:00 p.m., ESPN+	No. 15	Abilene Christian	W 88–55	6–0	21 – Grant	9 – Silva	7 – Wooten	Schollmaier Arena (2,621); Fort Worth, TX
November 18, 2026*; 6:30 p.m., ESPN+	No. 15	UT Arlington	W 96–48	7–0	18 – Wooten	12 – Silva	11 – Wooten	Schollmaier Arena (2,501); Fort Worth, TX
November 22, 2026*; 2:30 p.m., ESPN2	No. 15	vs. Utah State; Wild Horse Sports Lone Star Series						Dickies Arena; Fort Worth, TX
November 27, 2026*; 12:30 p.m., ION		vs. Georgia Tech; Fort Myers Tip-Off Shell Division						Suncoast Credit Union Arena; Fort Myers, FL
November 28, 2026*; 10:00 a.m., ION		vs. Mississippi State; Fort Myers Tip-Off Shell Division						Suncoast Credit Union Arena; Fort Myers, FL
December 3, 2026*; 6:00 p.m., ESPN+		at Memphis						Elma Roane Fieldhouse; Memphis, TN
December 6, 2026*; 12:00 p.m., ESPN2		vs. Texas; Wild Horse Sports Lone Star Series						Dickies Arena; Fort Worth, TX
December 10, 2026*; 6:30 p.m., ESPN+		UTSA						Schollmaier Arena; Fort Worth, TX
December 13, 2026*; 2:00 p.m., ESPN+		Penn State						Schollmaier Arena; Fort Worth, TX
Big 12 regular season
December 20, 2026; 2:00 p.m., ESPN+		Cincinnati						Schollmaier Arena; Fort Worth, TX
December 30, 2026; 6:30 p.m., ESPN+		at Iowa State						Hilton Coliseum; Ames, IA
January 2, 2027; 6:00 p.m., ESPN+		Texas Tech						Schollmaier Arena; Fort Worth, TX
January 6, 2027; 6:30 p.m., ESPN+		Utah						Schollmaier Arena; Fort Worth, TX
January 10, 2027; 2:00 p.m., ESPN/ESPN2		at West Virginia						Hope Coliseum; Morgantown, WV
January 14, 2027; 8:00 p.m., ESPN		Baylor						Schollmaier Arena; Fort Worth, TX
January 17, 2027; 3:00 p.m., ESPN+		at Arizona						McKale Center; Tucson, AZ
January 20, 2027; 6:00 p.m., CBSSN		at Arizona State						Desert Financial Arena; Tempe, AZ
January 23, 2027; 7:00 p.m., FS1		BYU						Schollmaier Arena; Fort Worth, TX
January 28, 2027; 7:00 p.m., ESPN		at Oklahoma State						Gallagher-Iba Arena; Stillwater, OK
January 31, 2027; 1:00 p.m., ESPN2		Colorado						Schollmaier Arena; Fort Worth, TX
February 4, 2027; 7:00 p.m., FS1		at Kansas State						Bramlage Coliseum; Manhattan, KS
February 7, 2027; 2:00 p.m., ESPN+		Houston						Schollmaier Arena; Fort Worth, TX
February 10, 2027; 8:00 p.m., CBSSN		at Kansas						Allen Fieldhouse; Lawrence, KS
February 15, 2027; 2:00 p.m., FOX		West Virginia						Schollmaier Arena; Fort Worth, TX
February 20, 2027; 1:00 p.m., ESPN+		at Houston						Fertitta Center; Houston, TX
February 23, 2027; 6:30 p.m., ESPN+		UCF						Schollmaier Arena; Fort Worth, TX
February 28, 2027; 3:00 p.m., FS1		at Baylor						Foster Pavilion; Waco, TX
Big 12 tournament
March 3–8, 2027; TBA		vs.						T-Mobile Center; Kansas City, MO
*Non-conference game. ^{#}Rankings from AP Poll. (#) Tournament seedings in parentheses. All times are in Central.

== Rankings ==
Ranking movements Legend: ██ Increase in ranking ██ Decrease in ranking
	Week																				
Poll	Pre	1	2	3	4	5	6	7	8	9	10	11	12	13	14	15	16	17	18	19	Final
AP	15	15	15																		
Coaches	16	15	15																		
