= 2026–27 BYU Cougars women's basketball team =

American college basketball season

2026–27 BYU Cougars women's basketball
- Conference: Big 12 Conference
- Record: 6–0 (0–0 Big 12)
- Head coach: Lee Cummard (2nd season)
- Assistant coaches: Keilani Unga; Josh Edwards; Andrew Curtis; Paisley Johnson-Harding
- Home arena: Marriott Center

2026–27 Big 12 women's basketball standings
	Conf.				Overall
Team	W		L	PCT	W		L	PCT
No. 15 TCU	0	–	0	–	7	–	0	1.000
BYU	0	–	0	–	6	–	0	1.000
Iowa State	0	–	0	–	6	–	0	1.000
Arizona State	0	–	0	–	5	–	0	1.000
Baylor	0	–	0	–	5	–	0	1.000
Colorado	0	–	0	–	5	–	0	1.000
Houston	0	–	0	–	5	–	0	1.000
Utah	0	–	0	–	5	–	0	1.000
No. 22 West Virginia	0	–	0	–	5	–	0	1.000
Texas Tech	0	–	0	–	4	–	0	1.000
Kansas State	0	–	0	–	5	–	1	.833
No. 25 Oklahoma State	0	–	0	–	5	–	1	.833
UCF	0	–	0	–	5	–	1	.833
Cincinnati	0	–	0	–	4	–	1	.800
Arizona	0	–	0	–	3	–	1	.750
Kansas	0	–	0	–	3	–	2	.600
† 2027 Big 12 tournament winner As of November 19, 2026; Rankings from AP poll

The 2026–27 BYU Cougars women's basketball team currently represents Brigham Young University during the 2026–27 NCAA Division I women's basketball season. The Cougars are led by second-year head coach Lee Cummard, and play their home games at the Marriott Center in Provo, Utah as a member of the Big 12 Conference.

== Previous season ==
The Cougars finished the 2025–26 season 26–12 overall and 9–9 in Big 12 play, to finish in a tie for ninth in the conference with Arizona State. As the No. 10 seed in the Big 12 tournament, they defeated No. 16 Houston and No. 8 Utah in the first and second rounds respectively, before falling to top-seeded TCU in the quarterfinals.

Following their tournament elimination, the Cougars earned an at-large bid to the WBIT for the first time, where they were seeded No. 1 in their bracket. They routed Alabama A&M and No. 4 Missouri in the first and second rounds, defeated No. 2 Stanford in the quarterfinals and won to fellow Big 12 member in Texas A&M Bracket No. 2 Kansas 70–67 in the semifinals, before falling to North Dakota State Bracket No. 4 Columbia in the championship game, 64–81.

== Offseason ==
=== Departures ===
BYU departures
Name	Number	Pos.	Height	Year	Hometown	Reason for departure
Arielle Mackey-Williams	8	Guard	5'9"	(redshirt) Junior	Ngati Porou, New Zealand	Graduated
Lara Rohkohl	13	Forward	6'3"	Senior	Hanover, Germany	Graduated
McKinley Willardson	15	Forward	6'1"	(redshirt) N/A	Corona, CA	Graduated; transferred to California Baptist (Note: Went on hiatus from team after the 2023–24 season to serve an 18-month mission for the Church of Jesus Christ of Latter Day Saints.)
Braeden Gunlock	20	Forward	6'0"	Freshman	Bigfork, MT	Transferred to Montana State
Heather Hamson	21	Forward	6'3"	(redshirt) Senior	Lindon, UT	Graduated
Marya Hudgins	23	Guard	6'0"	(redshirt) Junior	Aurora, CO	Transferred to West Virginia
Hattie Ogden	33	Forward	6'1"	Senior	Magrath, AB	Graduated

=== Incoming transfers ===
BYU incoming transfers
Name	Number	Pos.	Height	Year	Hometown	Previous school
Liza Astakhova	5	Guard/Forward	6'2"	Sophomore	Moscow, Russia	North Carolina

=== Recruiting class ===
College recruiting
Name	Hometown	School	Height	Weight	Commit date
Kennedy Woolston (Note: Woolston will not join the Cougars until the 2028–29 season after serving an 18-month mission for The Church of Jesus Christ of Latter-Day Saints.); G	Highland, UT	Lone Peak High School	6 ft 0 in (1.83 m)	N/A	
Kennedy Woolston; G	Recruit ratings: Rivals:				
Overall recruit ranking:
Note: In many cases, Scout, Rivals, 247Sports, On3, and ESPN may conflict in their listings of height and weight.; In these cases, the average was taken. ESPN grades are on a 100-point scale.; Sources:

== Preseason ==
On October 8, 2026, the Big 12 Conference released its annual preseason coaches poll and awards. BYU was picked to finish seventh in the conference.

=== Preseason rankings ===
Big 12 Preseason Coaches Poll
Place	Team	Votes
1	Oklahoma State	215 (1)
2	TCU	212 (6)
3	Baylor	199 (2)
4	West Virginia	186 (1)
5	Kansas	160
6	Arizona State	143
7	BYU	137
8	Colorado	126
9	Kansas State	121
10	Texas Tech	103
11	Iowa State	78
12	Utah	77
13	Arizona	55
14	Cincinnati	43
15	Houston	38
16	UCF	27
(#) first-place votes

=== Preseason All-Big 12 Team ===
Preseason All-Big 12 Team
Player	Year	Position
Delaney Gibb^{#}	Junior	Guard
^{#} unanimous selection

== Roster ==
2026–27 BYU Cougars women's basketball team
Players
Coaches

Pos.	#	Name	Height	Year	Previous school	Hometown
G	1	Prasayus Notoa	6 ft 1 in (1.85 m)	Fr	Brisbane State High School	Brisbane, Australia
G	2	Sydney Benally	5 ft 10 in (1.78 m)	So	Sandia High School	Albuquerque, NM
F	3	Bolanle Yussuf	6 ft 3 in (1.91 m)	So	Kyoto Seika Gakuen	Lagos, Nigeria
G/F	5	Liza Astakhova	6 ft 2 in (1.88 m)	So	North Carolina	Moscow, Russia
G	6	Vahayliah Seumanutafa	5 ft 10 in (1.78 m)	Fr	Brisbane State High School	Brisbane, Australia
G	7	Olivia Hamlin	5 ft 10 in (1.78 m)	Fr	Snow Canyon High School	Santa Clara, UT
G	10	Kailey Woolston	5 ft 11 in (1.8 m)	So	Lone Peak High School	Highland, UT
G	11	Delaney Gibb	5 ft 10 in (1.78 m)	Jr	Raymond High School	Raymond, AB
G	14	Kambree Barber Taylor	6 ft 0 in (1.83 m)	Jr	Rigby High School	Rigby, ID
G	22	Stella Salakas	6 ft 1 in (1.85 m)	Fr	Nazareth Academy	Western Springs, IL
G/F	24	Brinley Cannon	6 ft 1 in (1.85 m)	Jr	Shelley High School	Shelley, ID
F	30	Mariam Traore	6 ft 3 in (1.91 m)	Fr	Liahona Preparatory Academy	Kati, Mali

Head coach

- Lee Cummard (BYU)

Assistant coach(es)

- Keilani Unga (BYU)
- Josh Edwards (St. Catharine)
- Andrew Curtis (Northern Arizona)
- Paisley Johnson-Harding (BYU)

Legend

- (C) Team captain
- (S) Suspended
- (I) Ineligible
- (W) Walk-on
- Injured
- Current redshirt

Roster

== Schedule and results ==
Date time, TV	Rank^{#}	Opponent^{#}	Result	Record	High points	High rebounds	High assists	Site (attendance) city, state
Exhibition
October 27, 2026*; 7:00 p.m., ESPN+		Western Colorado	W 120–36		–	–	–	Marriott Center; Provo, UT
Non-conference regular season
November 3, 2026*; 7:00 p.m., ESPN+		Idaho State	W 67–50	1–0	17 – Gibb	8 – Traore	5 – Cannon	Marriott Center (2,168); Provo, UT
November 5, 2026*; 7:00 p.m., ESPN+		Portland	W 74–64	2–0	15 – Hamiln	10 – Tied	5 – Notoa	Marriott Center (2,352); Provo, UT
November 7, 2026*; 2:00 p.m., ESPN+		Montana	W 97–53	3–0	22 – Hamiln	10 – Gibb	10 – Gibb	Marriott Center (1,852); Provo, UT
November 11, 2026*; 11:00 a.m., ESPN+		Bethune–Cookman	W 82–56	4–0	14 – Tied	11 – Traore	8 – Gibb	Marriott Center (5,970); Provo, UT
November 14, 2026*; 2:00 p.m., ESPN+		New Mexico	W 82–65	5–0	28 – Gibb	7 – Gibb	5 – Gibb	Marriott Center (1,701); Provo, UT
November 18, 2026*; 2:00 p.m., ESPN+		Utah State	W 90–78	6–0	22 – Gibb	8 – Taylor	5 – Tied	Marriott Center (1,718); Provo, UT
November 21, 2026*; 2:00 p.m., ESPN+		Northern Colorado						Marriott Center; Provo, UT
November 24, 2026*; 7:00 p.m., ESPN+		at Utah Valley						UCCU Center; Orem, UT
November 27, 2026*; 12:30 p.m., BallerTV		vs. Fairfield; St. Pete's Showcase						McArthur Center; St. Petersburg, FL
November 28, 2026*; 12:30 p.m., BallerTV		vs. Boston College; St. Pete's Showcase						McArthur Center; St. Petersburg, FL
December 5, 2026*; 2:30 p.m., The CW		at Oregon State						Gill Coliseum; Corvallis, OR
December 9, 2026*; 2:00 p.m., ESPN+		Southern Utah						Marriott Center; Provo, UT
December 12, 2026*; 5:00 p.m., ESPN+		California Baptist						Marriott Center; Provo, UT
December 15, 2026*; 2:00 p.m., ESPN+		Weber State						Marriott Center; Provo, UT
Big 12 regular season
December 19, 2026; 2:00 p.m., ESPN+		at Arizona						McKale Center; Tucson, AZ
December 30, 2026; 7:00 p.m., ESPN+		Kansas State						Marriott Center; Provo, UT
January 2, 2027; 2:00 p.m., ESPN+		Houston						Marriott Center; Provo, UT
January 6, 2027; 6:00 p.m., ESPN+		at Baylor						Foster Pavilion; Waco, TX
January 9, 2027; 4:00 p.m., ESPN+		Arizona State						Marriott Center; Provo, UT
January 13, 2027; 6:00 p.m., ESPN+		at Colorado						CU Events Center; Boulder, CO
January 16, 2027; 12:00 p.m., CBSSN		Oklahoma State						Marriott Center; Provo, UT
January 23, 2027; 6:00 p.m., FS1		at TCU						Schollmaier Arena; Fort Worth, TX
January 27, 2027; 7:00 p.m., ESPN+		UCF						Marriott Center; Provo, UT
January 30, 2027; 6:30 p.m., ESPN+		at Texas Tech						United Supermarkets Arena; Lubbock, TX
February 3, 2026; 7:00 p.m., ESPN+		at Utah; Rivalry						Jon M. Huntsman Center; Salt Lake City, UT
February 6, 2026; 2:00 p.m., ESPN+		Kansas						Marriott Center; Provo, UT
February 10, 2026; 7:00 p.m., ESPN+		Arizona						Marriott Center; Provo, UT
February 13, 2026; 5:00 p.m., ESPN+		at Iowa State						Hilton Coliseum; Ames, IA
February 16, 2026; 7:00 p.m., ESPN+		Colorado						Marriott Center; Provo, UT
February 20, 2026; 10:00 a.m., ESPN+		at Cincinnati						Fifth Third Arena; Cincinnati, OH
February 23, 2026; 5:00 p.m., ESPN+		at West Virginia						Hope Coliseum; Morgantown, WV
February 27, 2026; 2:00 p.m., ESPN+		Utah; Rivalry						Marriott Center; Provo, UT
Big 12 tournament
March 3–8, 2027; TBA		vs.						T-Mobile Center; Kansas City, MO
*Non-conference game. ^{#}Rankings from AP Poll. (#) Tournament seedings in parentheses. All times are in Mountain.
