= 2026–27 West Virginia Mountaineers women's basketball team =

2026–27 West Virginia Mountaineers women's basketball
- Conference: Big 12 Conference

Ranking
- Coaches: No. 20
- AP: No. 22
- Record: 5–0 (0–0 Big 12)
- Head coach: Mark Kellogg (4th season)
- Associate head coach: JC Carter
- Assistant coaches: Erin Grant; Jessica Grayson; Kasondra McKay; Caden Roberts
- Home arena: Hope Coliseum

2026–27 Big 12 women's basketball standings
	Conf.				Overall
Team	W		L	PCT	W		L	PCT
No. 15 TCU	0	–	0	–	6	–	0	1.000
Baylor	0	–	0	–	5	–	0	1.000
BYU	0	–	0	–	5	–	0	1.000
Iowa State	0	–	0	–	5	–	0	1.000
Utah	0	–	0	–	5	–	0	1.000
Arizona State	0	–	0	–	4	–	0	1.000
Colorado	0	–	0	–	4	–	0	1.000
Houston	0	–	0	–	4	–	0	1.000
Texas Tech	0	–	0	–	4	–	0	1.000
No. 22 West Virginia	0	–	0	–	4	–	0	1.000
Kansas State	0	–	0	–	4	–	1	.800
No. 25 Oklahoma State	0	–	0	–	4	–	1	.800
UCF	0	–	0	–	4	–	1	.800
Arizona	0	–	0	–	3	–	1	.750
Cincinnati	0	–	0	–	3	–	1	.750
Kansas	0	–	0	–	3	–	1	.750
† 2027 Big 12 tournament winner As of November 17, 2026; Rankings from AP poll

The 2026–27 West Virginia Mountaineers women's basketball team currently represents West Virginia University during the 2026–27 NCAA Division I women's basketball season. The Mountaineers, led by fourth-year head coach Mark Kellogg, play their home games at the Hope Coliseum in Morgantown, West Virginia and compete as a member of the Big 12 Conference.

== Previous season ==
The Mountaineers finished the 2025–26 season 28–7 overall and 14–4 in Big 12 play, to finish second in the conference. Their 28 wins was their third most in program history, and their most in a season since the 2009–10 season (29).

As the No. 2 seed in the Big 12 tournament, they earned a double-bye to the quarterfinals, where they defeated No. 10 Arizona State before defeating No. 6 Colorado 48–47 in the semifinals. Finally, they defeated reigning Big 12 champions and top-seeded TCU in the championship game 62–53, winning the Big 12 title for the second time in program history and their first since 2017.

In the NCAA tournament, the Mountaineers were seeded No. 4 in the Fort Worth #3 Regional. They defeated No. 13 Miami (OH) in the first round, before falling to No. 5 Kentucky in the second round 73–74 to end their season.

== Offseason ==
=== Departures ===
West Virginia departures
Name	Num	Pos.	Height	Year	Hometown	Reason for departure
Carter McCray	1	Forward	6'1"	Junior	Oberlin, OH	Transferred to Michigan State
Sydney Woodley	2	Guard	5'8"	Senior	Menifee, CA	Graduated
Sydney Shaw	5	Guard	5'9"	Senior	Miami, FL	Graduated; signed with the UpShot League's Savannah Steel
Jordan Harrison	10	Guard	5'6"	Senior	Oklahoma City, OK	Graduated; went undrafted in the 2026 WNBA draft, signed a training camp contract with the Portland Fire
Riley Makalusky	21	Forward	6'2"	Junior	Fishers, IN	Transferred to Tennessee
Kierra Wheeler	22	Forward	6'1"	Graduate student	Minneapolis, MN	Graduated
Jordan Thomas	23	Forward	6'3"	Sophomore	Carrollton, TX	Transferred to Georgia
Loghan Johnson	25	Guard	5'10"	Junior	Houston, TX	Transferred to UNC Wilmington
Célia Rivière	37	Forward	6'3"	Senior	Paris, France	Graduated

=== Incoming transfers ===
West Virginia incoming transfers
Name	Num	Pos.	Height	Year	Hometown	Previous school
Nylah Wilson	1	Guard	5'9"	Sophomore	Richmond, VA	Pittsburgh
Kennedy Harris	2	Guard	5'7"	Senior	Hampton, VA	George Mason
Hawa Doumbouya	7	Forward/center	6'7"	(redshirt) Junior	The Bronx, NY	VCU
Khyala Ngodu	8	Center	6'3"	Senior	Fort Lauderdale, FL	UCF
Skylar Forbes	11	Forward	6'3"	Senior	Markham, Ontario	Marquette
Marya Hudgins	23	Guard	6'0"	(redshirt) Senior	Aurora, CO	BYU
Divine Tumba	24	Forward	6'2"	(redshirt) Freshman	Longueuil, Quebec	Pittsburgh
Alexis Bordas	30	Guard	5'8"	Sophomore	Wheeling, WV	Duquesne
Zahirah Walton	35	Guard/Forward	6'0"	Senior	Seattle, WA	George Mason

=== Recruiting class ===
College recruiting
Name	Hometown	School	Height	Weight	Commit date
Chanté Murray; F	Mississauga, Ontario	Crestwood Preparatory College	6 ft 1 in (1.85 m)	N/A	
Chanté Murray; F	Recruit ratings: 247Sports: ESPN: (92)				
Overall recruit ranking:
Note: In many cases, Scout, Rivals, 247Sports, On3, and ESPN may conflict in their listings of height and weight.; In these cases, the average was taken. ESPN grades are on a 100-point scale.; Sources: "2026 Player Commits". ESPN. Archived from the original on August 4, 2026.

== Preseason ==
On October 8, 2026, the Big 12 Conference released its annual preseason coaches poll and awards. West Virginia was picked to finish fourth in the conference, along with one first place vote.

=== Preseason rankings ===
Big 12 Preseason Coaches Poll
Place	Team	Votes
1	Oklahoma State	215 (1)
2	TCU	212 (6)
3	Baylor	199 (2)
4	West Virginia	186 (1)
5	Kansas	160
6	Arizona State	143
7	BYU	137
8	Colorado	126
9	Kansas State	121
10	Texas Tech	103
11	Iowa State	78
12	Utah	77
13	Arizona	55
14	Cincinnati	43
15	Houston	38
16	UCF	27
(#) first-place votes

=== Preseason All-Big 12 Team ===
Preseason All-Big 12 Team
Player	Year	Position
Gia Cooke	(redshirt) Senior	Guard
^{#} unanimous selection

== Roster ==
2026–27 West Virginia Mountaineers women's basketball team
Players
Coaches

Pos.	#	Name	Height	Year	Previous school	Hometown
G	1	Nylah Wilson	5 ft 9 in (1.75 m)	So	IMG Academy; Pittsburgh	Richmond, VA
G	2	Kennedy Harris	5 ft 7 in (1.7 m)	Sr	Hampton High School; George Mason	Hampton, VA
G	3	Gia Cooke	5 ft 8 in (1.73 m)	RS Sr	Bishop McNamara High School; Maryland	Clinton, MD
F	4	Madison Parrish	5 ft 11 in (1.8 m)	So	William Mason High School	Mason, OH
F	5	Chanté Murray	6 ft 1 in (1.85 m)	Fr	Crestwood Preparatory College	Mississauga, Ontario
F/C	7	Hawa Doumbouya	6 ft 7 in (2.01 m)	RS Jr	Our Lady of Mount Carmel School; VCU	The Bronx, NY
C	8	Khyala Ngodu	6 ft 3 in (1.91 m)	Sr	Dillard High School; UCF	Fort Lauderdale, FL
F	11	Skylar Forbes	6 ft 3 in (1.91 m)	Sr	Scarborough Prep; Marquette	Markham, Ontario
G	23	Marya Hudgins	6 ft 0 in (1.83 m)	RS Sr	Grandview High School; BYU	Aurora, CO
F	24	Divine Tumba	6 ft 2 in (1.88 m)	RS Fr	Royal Crown Academy; Pittsburgh	Longueil, Quebec
G	30	Alexis Bordas	5 ft 8 in (1.73 m)	So	Wheeling Park High School; Duquesne	Wheeling, WV
G/F	35	Zahirah Walton	6 ft 0 in (1.83 m)	Sr	Kentlake High School; George Mason	Seattle, WA

Head coach

- Mark Kellogg (Austin College)

Assistant coach(es)

- JC Carter (Southwest Baptist)
- Erin Grant (Texas Tech)
- Jessica Grayson (Austin Peay)
- Kassondra McKay (Louisiana Tech)
- Caden Roberts (West Virginia)

Legend

- (C) Team captain
- (S) Suspended
- (I) Ineligible
- (W) Walk-on
- Injured
- Current redshirt

Roster
Last update: August 4, 2026

== Schedule and results ==
Date time, TV	Rank^{#}	Opponent^{#}	Result	Record	High points	High rebounds	High assists	Site (attendance) city, state
Exhibition
October 29, 2026*; 7:00 p.m.	No. 24	Frostburg State	W 111–41		17 – Tumba	10 – Tumba	4 – Walton	Hope Coliseum (1,458); Morgantown, WV
Non-conference regular season
November 3, 2026*; 7:00 p.m., ESPN+	No. 24	Rhode Island	W 68–64	1–0	28 – Cooke	8 – Ngodu	8 – Tied	Hope Coliseum (3,419); Morgantown, WV
November 5, 2026*; 7:00 p.m., ESPN+	No. 24	George Washington	W 78–66	2–0	26 – Forbes	9 – Tumba	4 – Cooke	Hope Coliseum (3,232); Morgantown, WV
November 8, 2026*; 2:00 p.m., ACCNX/ESPN+	No. 24	at Georgia Tech	W 81–63	3–0	23 – Forbes	10 – Ngodu	5 – Walton	McCamish Pavilion (2,875); Atlanta, GA
November 13, 2026*; 5:30 p.m., CBSSN	No. 24	vs. Northwestern; Greenbrier Tip-Off	W 66–53	4–0	22 – Cooke	6 – Tied	3 – Tied	Colonial Hall (1,020); White Sulphur Springs, WV
November 17, 2026*; 10:30 a.m., ESPN+	No. 22	Akron	W 98–60	5–0	21 – Forbes	11 – Tumba	6 – Cooke	Hope Coliseum (9,328); Morgantown, WV
November 24, 2026*; 3:30 p.m., ESPN+		vs. Florida; Battle 4 Atlantis						Imperial Arena; Nassau, The Bahamas
November 26, 2026*; 11:30 a.m., ESPN2		vs. Notre Dame; Battle 4 Atlantis						Imperial Arena; Nassau, The Bahamas
November 30, 2026*; 7:00 p.m., ESPN+		Coppin State						Hope Coliseum; Morgantown, WV
December 3, 2026*; 7:00 p.m., ESPN+		Mount St. Mary's						Hope Coliseum; Morgantown, WV
December 4, 2026*; 7:00 p.m., ESPN+		Harvard						Hope Coliseum; Morgantown, WV
December 12, 2026*; 6:00 p.m., ESPN+		at Villanova						Finneran Pavilion; Villanova, PA
December 15, 2026*; 7:00 p.m., ESPN+		Robert Morris						Hope Coliseum; Morgantown, WV
Big 12 regular season
December 20, 2026; 2:00 p.m., ESPN+		at UCF						Addition Financial Arena; Orlando, FL
December 30, 2026; 7:00 p.m., ESPN+		Kansas						Hope Coliseum; Morgantown, WV
January 3, 2027; 8:00 p.m., ESPN2		at Oklahoma State						Gallagher-Iba Arena; Stillwater, OK
January 6, 2027; 8:00 p.m., ESPN+		at Houston						Fertitta Center; Houston, TX
January 10, 2027; 3:00 p.m., ESPN/ESPN2		TCU						Hope Coliseum; Morgantown, WV
January 13, 2027; 5:00 p.m., CBSSN		Kansas State						Hope Coliseum; Morgantown, WV
January 17, 2027; 5:00 p.m., ESPN		at Baylor						Foster Pavilion; Waco, TX
January 20, 2027; 7:00 p.m., ESPN+		Colorado						Hope Coliseum; Morgantown, WV
January 23, 2027; 2:00 p.m., ESPN+		Iowa State						Hope Coliseum; Morgantown, WV
January 27, 2027; 7:00 p.m., ESPN+		at Texas Tech						United Supermarkets Arena; Lubbock, TX
January 30, 2027; 2:00 p.m., ESPN+		Cincinnati						Hope Coliseum; Morgantown, WV
February 3, 2027; 10:00 p.m., ESPNU		at Arizona State						Desert Financial Arena; Tempe, AZ
February 6, 2027; 9:00 p.m., ESPN+		at Arizona						McKale Center; Tucson, AZ
February 9, 2027; 7:00 p.m., ESPN+		Utah						Hope Coliseum; Morgantown, WV
February 15, 2027; 3:00 p.m., FOX		at TCU						Schollmaier Arena; Fort Worth, TX
February 20, 2027; 2:00 p.m., ESPN+		Texas Tech						Hope Coliseum; Morgantown, WV
February 23, 2027; 7:00 p.m., ESPN+		BYU						Hope Coliseum; Morgantown, WV
February 27, 2027; 2:00 p.m., ESPN+		at Cincinnati						Fifth Third Arena; Cincinnati, OH
Big 12 tournament
March 3–7, 2027; TBA		vs.						T-Mobile Center; Kansas City, MO
*Non-conference game. ^{#}Rankings from AP Poll. (#) Tournament seedings in parentheses. All times are in Eastern.

== Rankings ==
Ranking movements Legend: ██ Increase in ranking ██ Decrease in ranking
	Week																				
Poll	Pre	1	2	3	4	5	6	7	8	9	10	11	12	13	14	15	16	17	18	19	Final
AP	24	24	22																		
Coaches	24	22	20																		
