= 2026–27 Portland Pilots women's basketball team =

American college basketball season

2026–27 Portland Pilots women's basketball
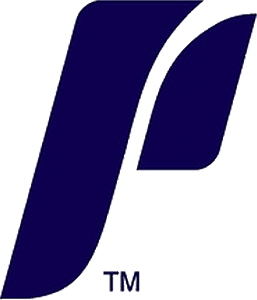
- Conference: West Coast Conference
- Record: 1–2 (0–0 WCC)
- Head coach: Michael Meek (8th season)
- Assistant coaches: Tom Batsell; Sharon Rissmiller; Jerod Gibson; Kianna Hamilton
- Home arena: Chiles Center

2026–27 West Coast Conference women's basketball standings
| | Conf. | | | | Overall |
| Team | W | | L | PCT | W | | L | PCT |
|---|---|---|---|---|---|---|---|---|
| Loyola Marymount | 0 | – | 0 | – | 2 | – | 0 | 1.000 |
| Santa Clara | 0 | – | 0 | – | 2 | – | 0 | 1.000 |
| Seattle | 0 | – | 0 | – | 2 | – | 0 | 1.000 |
| Pacific | 0 | – | 0 | – | 1 | – | 1 | .500 |
| Pepperdine | 0 | – | 0 | – | 1 | – | 1 | .500 |
| San Diego | 0 | – | 0 | – | 1 | – | 1 | .500 |
| San Francisco | 0 | – | 0 | – | 1 | – | 1 | .500 |
| Denver | 0 | – | 0 | – | 1 | – | 2 | .333 |
| Portland | 0 | – | 0 | – | 1 | – | 2 | .333 |
| Saint Mary's | 0 | – | 0 | – | 0 | – | 2 | .000 |
† 2027 WCC tournament winner As of November 9, 2026

The 2026–27 Portland Pilots women's basketball team will represent the University of Portland in the 2026–27 NCAA Division I women's basketball season. The Pilots are led by eighth-year head coach Michael Meek and play their home games at the Chiles Center in Portland, Oregon as members of the West Coast Conference (WCC).

== Previous season ==
The Pilots finished the 2025–26 season 20–15, 11–7 in WCC play, to finish in fifth place. As the fifth seed in the WCC tournament, they beat the nine seed Washington State in the third round, but lost to fourth seed Oregon State in the quarterfinals. They were invited to the WBIT, where they beat Sam Houston in the first round and Lamar in the second round, but lost to Montana State in the quarterfinals.

== Preseason ==
On October 14, 2026, the West Coast Conference released their preseason poll. Portland was picked to finish second in the conference.

=== Preseason rankings ===
WCC Preseason Poll
| Place | Team | Votes |
|---|---|---|
| 1 | Santa Clara | 74 (4) |
| 2 | Portland | 71 (4) |
| 3 | Loyola Marymount | 63 (2) |
| 4 | Pepperdine | 59 |
| 5 | San Francisco | 58 |
| 6 | San Diego | 35 |
| 7 | Pacific | 34 |
| 8 | Seattle | 24 |
| 9 | Saint Mary's | 22 |
| 10 | Denver | 10 |
(#) first-place votes

=== Preseason All-WCC Team ===
Preseason All-WCC Team
| Player | Year | Position |
|---|---|---|
| Dyani Ananiev | Senior | Guard |
| Florence Dallow | 5th | Guard |

== Roster ==
2026–27 Portland Pilots women's basketball team
Players
Coaches

| Pos. | # | Name | Height | Year | Previous school | Hometown |
|---|---|---|---|---|---|---|
| F | 00 | Goundo Diakite Bayo | 6 ft 1 in (1.85 m) | So | IES Carles Vallbona | Barcelona, Spain |
| G | 1 | Sara Mangan | 5 ft 8 in (1.73 m) | Fr | Southridge High School | Beaverton, OR |
| G | 2 | Dyani Ananiev | 6 ft 2 in (1.88 m) | RS Sr | Wyndham College | St Andrews, Australia |
| G | 3 | Florence Dallow | 6 ft 2 in (1.88 m) | RS Sr | Epsom Girls' Grammar School | Auckland, New Zealand |
| G | 4 | Pahlyss Hokianga | 5 ft 6 in (1.68 m) | Fr | Tauranga Girls' College | Hawke's Bay, New Zealand |
| G | 5 | Aubrey Herrin | 6 ft 1 in (1.85 m) | So | Kamiakin HS | Kennewick, WA |
| G | 7 | Tiffany Barbosa | 5 ft 10 in (1.78 m) | Jr | RIG Lulea | Stockholm, Sweden |
| C | 9 | Jada Kennedy | 6 ft 5 in (1.96 m) | So | Siena College | Melbourne, Australia |
| F | 11 | Carly Gonzalez | 6 ft 2 in (1.88 m) | Fr | St. Michael's Catholic Preparatory School | Austin, TX |
| G | 12 | Brynn Smith | 6 ft 0 in (1.83 m) | So | Willamette HS | Eugene, OR |
| G | 14 | Caitlin Monahan | 5 ft 10 in (1.78 m) | RS Jr | Mercer Island HS | Mercer Island, WA |
| F | 20 | Lainey Spear | 6 ft 2 in (1.88 m) | Sr | Beaverton HS | Portland, OR |
| G | 22 | Rhyan Mogel | 5 ft 10 in (1.78 m) | Sr | Clackamas HS | Happy Valley, OR |
| G/F | 26 | Maddie Angus | 6 ft 0 in (1.83 m) | Fr | Star of the Sea College | Black Rock, Australia |
| F/C | 42 | Ella Zimmerman | 6 ft 4 in (1.93 m) | Jr | Redondo Union HS | Redondo Beach, CA |
| F/C | 44 | Julia Dalan | 6 ft 3 in (1.91 m) | So | W. F. West HS | Centralia, WA |

Head coach

- Michael Meek (Eastern Oregon)

Assistant coach(es)

- Tom Batsell (Pacific)
- Sharon Rissmiller (Portland)
- Jerod Gibson (Portland State)
- Kianna Hamilton (Portland)

Legend

- (C) Team captain
- (S) Suspended
- (I) Ineligible
- (W) Walk-on
- Injured
- Current redshirt

Roster

== Schedule and results ==
| Date time, TV | Rank^{#} | Opponent^{#} | Result | Record | High points | High rebounds | High assists | Site (attendance) city, state |
Non-conference regular season
| November 2, 2026*; 7:30 p.m., ESPN+ | | Willamette | W 107-29 | 1-0 | 13 – Mangan | 5 – Tied | 3 – Tied | Chiles Center (1,066); Portland, OR |
| November 5, 2026*; 1:00 p.m., ESPN+ | | at BYU | L 64-74 | 1-1 | 18 – Mangan | 7 – Spear | 3 – Tied | Marriott Center (2,352); Provo, UT |
| November 8, 2026*; 1:00 p.m., ESPN+ | | at Montana State | L 65-75 | 1-2 | 14 – Mogel | 11 – Dalan | 3 – Tied | Worthington Arena (2,404); Bozeman, MT |
| November 11, 2026*; 6:00 p.m., ESPN+ | | Warner Pacific | | | | | | Chiles Center; Portland, OR |
| November 14, 2026*; 6:00 p.m. | | Long Beach State | | | | | | Chiles Center; Portland, OR |
| November 18, 2026*; 6:00 p.m., ESPN+ | | Portland State | | | | | | Chiles Center; Portland, OR |
| November 22, 2026*; 2:00 p.m., ESPN+ | | Stanford | | | | | | Chiles Center; Portland, OR |
| November 25, 2026*; 2:00 p.m., ESPN+ | | UC Santa Barbara | | | | | | Chiles Center; Portland, OR |
| December 2, 2026*; 6:00 p.m., ESPN+ | | South Carolina State | | | | | | Chiles Center; Portland, OR |
| December 5, 2026*; 2:00 p.m. | | at Washington State | | | | | | Beasley Coliseum; Pullman, WA |
| December 13, 2026*; TBA, ESPN+ | | at Princeton | | | | | | Jadwin Gymnasium; Princeton, NJ |
| December 16, 2026*; TBA, B1G+ | | at Oregon | | | | | | Matthew Knight Arena; Eugene, OR |
| December 19, 2026*; 2:00 p.m., ESPN+ | | Wyoming | | | | | | Chiles Center; Portland, OR |
| December 21, 2026*; TBA, MW+ | | at New Mexico | | | | | | The Pit; Albuquerque, NM |
WCC regular season
| December 31, 2026; TBA, ESPN+ | | at Pacific | | | | | | Alex G. Spanos Center; Stockton, CA |
| January 2, 2027; TBA, ESPN+ | | at Santa Clara | | | | | | Leavey Center; Santa Clara, CA |
| January 7, 2027; 6:00 p.m., ESPN+ | | San Diego | | | | | | Chiles Center; Portland, OR |
| January 9, 2027; 5:00 p.m., ESPN+ | | Denver | | | | | | Chiles Center; Portland, OR |
| January 14, 2027; TBA, ESPN+ | | at Loyola Marymount | | | | | | Gersten Pavilion; Los Angeles, CA |
| January 16, 2027; TBA, ESPN+ | | at Pepperdine | | | | | | Firestone Fieldhouse; Malibu, CA |
| January 21, 2027; TBA, ESPN+ | | at San Diego | | | | | | Jenny Craig Pavilion; San Diego, CA |
| January 23, 2027; 5:00 p.m., ESPN+ | | San Francisco | | | | | | Chiles Center; Portland, OR |
| January 28, 2027; 6:00 p.m., ESPN+ | | Saint Mary's | | | | | | Chiles Center; Portland, OR |
| January 30, 2027; TBA, ESPN+ | | at Denver | | | | | | Hamilton Gymnasium; Denver, CO |
| February 4, 2027; 6:00 p.m., ESPN+ | | Seattle | | | | | | Chiles Center; Portland, OR |
| February 6, 2027; 2:00 p.m., ESPN+ | | at San Francisco | | | | | | Sobrato Center; San Francisco, CA |
| February 11, 2027; 6:00 p.m., ESPN+ | | Loyola Marymount | | | | | | Chiles Center; Portland, OR |
| February 13, 2027; 5:00 p.m., ESPN+ | | Santa Clara | | | | | | Chiles Center; Portland, OR |
| February 18, 2027; TBA, ESPN+ | | at Saint Mary's | | | | | | University Credit Union Pavilion; Moraga, CA |
| February 20, 2027; 1:00 p.m., ESPN+ | | at Seattle | | | | | | Redhawk Center; Seattle, WA |
| February 25, 2027; 6:00 p.m., ESPN+ | | Pacific | | | | | | Chiles Center; Portland, OR |
| February 27, 2027; 5:00 p.m., ESPN+ | | Pepperdine | | | | | | Chiles Center; Portland, OR |
WCC tournament
| March 5-9, 2027; TBA, ESPN+ | | vs. | | | | | | Orleans Arena; Paradise, NV |
*Non-conference game. ^{#}Rankings from AP poll. (#) Tournament seedings in parentheses. All times are in Pacific.

== See also ==
- 2026–27 Portland Pilots men's basketball team

== Rankings ==
Ranking movements
| | Week | | | | | | | | | | | | | | | | | | | |
| Poll | Pre | 1 | 2 | 3 | 4 | 5 | 6 | 7 | 8 | 9 | 10 | 11 | 12 | 13 | 14 | 15 | 16 | 17 | 18 | Final |
|---|---|---|---|---|---|---|---|---|---|---|---|---|---|---|---|---|---|---|---|---|
| AP | | | | | | | | | | | | | | | | | | | | Not released |
| Coaches | | | | | | | | | | | | | | | | | | | | |
