= 2026–27 Santa Clara Broncos women's basketball team =

American collegiate basketball season

2026–27 Santa Clara Broncos women's basketball
- Conference: West Coast Conference
- Record: 0–0 (0–0 WCC)
- Head coach: Loree Payne (2nd season)
- Associate head coach: TJ Harris
- Assistant coaches: Ryan Freeman; Nike McClure; Katie Bussey Mayes; Martin Jensen
- Home arena: Leavey Center

2026–27 West Coast Conference women's basketball standings
	Conf.				Overall
Team	W		L	PCT	W		L	PCT
Denver	0	–	0	–	0	–	0	–
Loyola Marymount	0	–	0	–	0	–	0	–
Pacific	0	–	0	–	0	–	0	–
Pepperdine	0	–	0	–	0	–	0	–
Portland	0	–	0	–	0	–	0	–
San Diego	0	–	0	–	0	–	0	–
San Francisco	0	–	0	–	0	–	0	–
Saint Mary's	0	–	0	–	0	–	0	–
Santa Clara	0	–	0	–	0	–	0	–
Seattle	0	–	0	–	0	–	0	–
† 2027 WCC tournament winner

The 2026–27 Santa Clara Broncos women's basketball team represents Santa Clara University during the 2026–27 NCAA Division I women's basketball season. The Broncos, led by second-year head coach Loree Payne, play their home games at the Leavey Center in Santa Clara, California, as members of the West Coast Conference.

== Previous season ==
The Broncos finished the 2025–26 season 24–10, 13–5 in WCC play, to finish in a tie for third place. As an No. 3 seed in the WCC tournament, they defeated San Francisco in the quarterfinals before losing in the semifinals Gonzaga. They received an at-large bid to the WBIT in the North Dakota State bracket where they lost in the first round to California.

== Offseason ==
=== Departures ===
Santa Clara Departures
Name	Num	Pos.	Height	Year	Hometown	Reason for Departure
Maddy Warberg	4	G	5'11"	Freshman	Eugene, OR	Transferred to IU Indy
Sienna Grieger	6	G	5'9"	Freshman	West Adelaide, Australia	Transferred to California Baptist
Lauren Grover	10	F	6'1"	Senior	Corona, CA	Graduated
Alana Goodchild	11	F	6'2"	Senior	Sydney, Australia	Graduated
Sophie Glancey	12	F	6'2"	Graduate Student	Boise, ID	Graduated
Ashley Hawkins	23	G	5'6"	Graduate Student	Long Beach, CA	Graduated

=== Incoming transfers ===
Santa Clara incoming transfers
Name	Num	Pos.	Height	Year	Hometown	Previous School
Emma Najjuma	23	F	6'4"	(redshirt) Junior	Mukono, Uganda	New Mexico
Joana Magalhães	31	G	5'5"	Junior	Lisbon, Portgual	New Mexico

==== Recruiting ====
There was no recruiting class of 2026.

== Roster ==
2026–27 Santa Clara Broncos women's basketball team
Players
Coaches

Pos.	#	Name	Height	Year	Previous school	Hometown
G	1	Quinsey Bryan	5 ft 9 in (1.75 m)	Fr	San Clemente High School	Ladera Ranch, California
G	2	Aniya Hooker	5 ft 8 in (1.73 m)	Jr	Siena	Lynnwood, Washington
G	3	Kate Schat	5 ft 9 in (1.75 m)	So	Cardinal Newman High School	Redwood Valley, California
G	5	Sara Schmerbach	5 ft 11 in (1.8 m)	So	South Medford High School	South Medford, Oregon
G	9	Maia Jones	5 ft 10 in (1.78 m)	RS Sr	Saint Mary's	Tasman, New Zealand
G	11	Brooke Blachly	5 ft 8 in (1.73 m)	Fr	Archbishop Murphy High School	Everett, Washington
F	13	Ava Schmidt	6 ft 2 in (1.88 m)	Sr	Northern Arizona	Sammamish, Washington
G	20	Delainey Miller	5 ft 10 in (1.78 m)	So	Cherokee Trail High School	Aurora, Colorado
F	23	Emma Najjuma	6 ft 4 in (1.93 m)	RS Jr	New Mexico	Mukono Seeta, Uganda
G	24	Reilly Clark	5 ft 10 in (1.78 m)	RS Jr	Northern Arizona	Tucson, Arizona
F	30	Kylee Fox	5 ft 11 in (1.8 m)	Sr	Fresno State	Richland, Washington
G	31	Joana Magalhães	5 ft 5 in (1.65 m)	Jr	New Mexico	Lisbon, Portugal
F	34	Tyler Gildersleeve-Stiles	6 ft 1 in (1.85 m)	So	Snohomish High School	Snohomish, Washington

Head coach

- Loree Payne (Washington)

Assistant coach(es)

- TJ Harris (Great Falls)
- Ryan Freeman (Florida)
- Nike McClure (New Mexico)
- Katie Bussey Mayes (Montana State)
- Martin Jensen (Cal State San Marcos)

Legend

- (C) Team captain
- (S) Suspended
- (I) Ineligible
- (W) Walk-on
- Injured
- Current redshirt

Roster

== Schedule and results ==
Date time, TV	Rank^{#}	Opponent^{#}	Result	Record	High points	High rebounds	High assists	Site (attendance) city, state
Non-conference regular season
November 2, 2026*; 5:30 p.m., MW+		at Wyoming						Arena-Auditorium; Laramie, WY
November 7, 2026*; 3:00 p.m., ESPN+		at Utah Valley						UCCU Center; Orem, UT
November 9, 2026*; 6:00 p.m., ESPN+		at Long Beach State						LBS Financial Credit Union Pyramid; Long Beach, CA
November 13, 2026*; 7:00 p.m., ESPN+		Stanford						Leavey Center; Santa Clara, CA
November 17, 2026*; 7:00 p.m., ESPN+		Grand Canyon						Leavey Center; Santa Clara, CA
November 20, 2026*; 5:30 p.m., ESPN+		at Arizona State						Mullett Arena; Tempe, AZ
November 27, 2026*; 5:00 p.m., ESPN+		vs. Xavier; Paradise Jam Island Division semifinal						UVI Sports and Fitness Center; Charlotte Amalie, USVI
November 28, 2026*; 9:30 a.m./12:00 p.m., ESPN+		vs. Air Force/Texas Tech; Paradise Jam Island Division						UVI Sports and Fitness Center; Charlotte Amalie, USVI
December 3, 2026*; 7:00 p.m., ESPN+		San Diego State						Leavey Center; Santa Clara, CA
December 6, 2026*; 1:00 p.m., ESPN+		UC Santa Cruz						Leavey Center; Santa Clara, CA
December 13, 2026*; 1:00 p.m., Pac-12 YouTube		at Boise State						ExtraMile Arena; Boise, ID
December 17, 2026*; 7:00 p.m., B1G+		at Washington						Alaska Airlines Arena; Seattle, WA
December 21, 2026*; 1:00 p.m., ESPN+		Montana State						Leavey Center; Santa Clara, CA
December 28, 2026*; 7:00 p.m., ESPN+		Dominican						Leavey Center; Santa Clara, CA
WCC regular season
December 31, 2026; 12:00 p.m., ESPN+		at Denver						Hamilton Gymnasium; Denver, CO
January 2, 2027; 1:00 p.m., ESPN+		Portland						Leavey Center; Santa Clara, CA
January 7, 2027; 7:00 p.m., ESPN+		at Saint Mary's						University Credit Union Pavilion; Moraga, CA
January 9, 2027; 1:00 p.m., ESPN+		Loyola Marymount						Leavey Center; Santa Clara, CA
January 14, 2027; 7:00 p.m., ESPN+		Seattle						Leavey Center; Santa Clara, CA
January 16, 2027; 2:00 p.m., ESPN+		at San Diego						Sobrato Center; San Francisco, CA
January 21, 2027; 7:00 p.m., ESPN+		Denver						Leavey Center; Santa Clara, CA
January 23, 2027; 1:00 p.m., ESPN+		at Pacific						Alex G. Spanos Center; Stockton, CA
January 28, 2027; 7:00 p.m., ESPN+		San Diego						Leavey Center; Santa Clara, CA
January 30, 2027; 7:00 p.m., ESPN+		at Pepperdine						Firestone Fieldhouse; Malibu, CA
February 4, 2027; 7:00 p.m., ESPN+		San Francisco						Leavey Center; Santa Clara, CA
February 6, 2027; 1:00 p.m., ESPN+		Saint Mary's						Leavey Center; Santa Clara, CA
February 11, 2027; 6:00 p.m., ESPN+		at Seattle						Redhawk Center; Seattle, WA
February 13, 2027; 5:00 p.m., ESPN+		at Portland						Chiles Center; Portland, OR
February 18, 2027; 7:00 p.m., ESPN+		Pacific						Leavey Center; Santa Clara, CA
February 20, 2027; 1:00 p.m., ESPN+		Pepperdine						Leavey Center; Santa Clara, CA
February 25, 2027; 6:00 p.m., ESPN+		at Loyola Marymount						Gersten Pavilion; Los Angeles, CA
February 27, 2027; 2:00 p.m., ESPN+		at San Diego						Jenny Craig Pavilion; San Diego, CA
WCC tournament
March 5–9, 2027; TBA		vs.						Orleans Arena; Paradise, NV
*Non-conference game. ^{#}Rankings from AP Poll. (#) Tournament seedings in parentheses. All times are in Pacific.
