= 2026–27 San Diego Toreros women's basketball team =

American college basketball season

2026–27 San Diego Toreros women's basketball
- Conference: West Coast Conference
- Record: 1–1 (0–0 WCC)
- Head coach: Blanche Alverson (2nd season)
- Assistant coaches: Samantha Guastella; Jon Silver; Jualeah Woods; Paul Henry Fabbri
- Home arena: Jenny Craig Pavilion

2026–27 West Coast Conference women's basketball standings
	Conf.				Overall
Team	W		L	PCT	W		L	PCT
Santa Clara	0	–	0	–	3	–	0	1.000
Loyola Marymount	0	–	0	–	2	–	0	1.000
Seattle	0	–	0	–	2	–	1	.667
Pacific	0	–	0	–	1	–	1	.500
Pepperdine	0	–	0	–	1	–	1	.500
San Diego	0	–	0	–	1	–	1	.500
San Francisco	0	–	0	–	1	–	1	.500
Denver	0	–	0	–	1	–	2	.333
Portland	0	–	0	–	1	–	2	.333
Saint Mary's	0	–	0	–	0	–	2	.000
† 2027 WCC tournament winner As of November 11, 2026

The 2026–27 San Diego Toreros women's basketball team will represent the University of San Diego during the 2026–27 NCAA Division I women's basketball season. The Toreros, led by second-year head coach Blanche Alverson, play their home games at the Jenny Craig Pavilion in San Diego, California as members of the West Coast Conference.

== Previous season ==
The Toreros finished the 2025–26 season 11–22, 4–14 in WCC play, to finish in eleventh (last) place. They defeated Saint Mary's, before falling to San Francisco in the second round of the WCC tournament.

== Preseason ==
On October 14, 2026, the West Coast Conference released their preseason poll. San Diego was picked to finish sixth in the conference.

=== Preseason rankings ===
WCC Preseason Poll
Place	Team	Votes
1	Santa Clara	74 (4)
2	Portland	71 (4)
3	Loyola Marymount	63 (2)
4	Pepperdine	59
5	San Francisco	58
6	San Diego	35
7	Pacific	34
8	Seattle	24
9	Saint Mary's	22
10	Denver	10
(#) first-place votes

=== Preseason All-WCC Team ===
Preseason All-WCC Team
Player	Year	Position
Kylie Ray	Junior	Guard

== Roster ==
2026–27 San Diego Toreros women's basketball team
Players
Coaches

Pos.	#	Name	Height	Year	Previous school	Hometown
F	2	Ryanne Bahnsen-Price	6 ft 0 in (1.83 m)	So	Roosevelt High School	Erie, Colorado
G	3	Lilly Amor	5 ft 11 in (1.8 m)	Jr	Templestowe College	Melbourne, Australia
G	4	Jessica Ajayi	5 ft 10 in (1.78 m)	So	Kentwood High School	Kent, Washington
G	5	Lauren McCall	5 ft 6 in (1.68 m)	GS	Timberline High School	Boise, Idaho
G	6	Kylie Ray	5 ft 8 in (1.73 m)	Jr	Utah	La Crescenta, California
G	7	Rosalie Esser	5 ft 8 in (1.73 m)	Fr	N/A	Berlin, Germany
F	9	Kiera Pemberton	6 ft 1 in (1.85 m)	Sr	Baylor	Langley, British Columbia
F	10	Kate Danner	6 ft 2 in (1.88 m)	Fr	Highland Park High School	Dallas, Texas
G/F	11	Sammie Wagner	6 ft 1 in (1.85 m)	GS	Oregon	San Antonio, Texas
F	15	Eva Ruse	6 ft 2 in (1.88 m)	Jr	Mulgrave School	North Vancouver, British Columbia
F	20	Braelynn Barnett	6 ft 1 in (1.85 m)	So	Georgetown	Aurora, Colorado
F	22	Ayla Williams	6 ft 0 in (1.83 m)	So	Centennial High School	Las Vegas, Nevada
G	24	Olivia Owens	5 ft 10 in (1.78 m)	So	Phoenix Country Day School	Columbus, Ohio

Head coach

- Blanche Alverson (Auburn)

Assistant coach(es)

- Samantha Guastella (Quinnipiac)
- Jon Silver (UCLA)
- Jualeah Woods (USC)
- Paul Henry Fabbri (Quinnipiac)

Legend

- (C) Team captain
- (S) Suspended
- (I) Ineligible
- (W) Walk-on
- Injured
- Current redshirt

Roster
Last update: October 27, 2026

== Schedule and results ==
Date time, TV	Rank^{#}	Opponent^{#}	Result	Record	High points	High rebounds	High assists	Site (attendance) city, state
Non-conference regular season
November 2, 2026*; 5:00 pm, ESPN+		at New Mexico State	W 61-56	1-0	22 – Pemberton	10 – Ruse	3 – Tied	Pan American Center (822); Las Cruces, NM
November 7, 2026*; 3:00 pm, YouTube		vs. UC San Diego; Bill Walton Classic	L 88-90 ^{OT}	1-1	20 – Ruse	13 – Ruse	5 – Tied	Pechanga Arena (3,432); San Diego, CA
November 10, 2026*; 6:00 pm		Portland State						Jenny Craig Pavilion; San Diego, CA
November 14, 2026*; 2:00 pm		Cal State Northridge						Jenny Craig Pavilion; San Diego, CA
November 17, 2026*; 5:30 pm		at Arizona State						Desert Financial Arena; Tempe, AZ
November 21, 2026*; 7:00 pm		UC Irvine						Jenny Craig Pavilion; San Diego, CA
November 25, 2026*; 6:00 pm		at Utah Tech						Burns Arena; St. George, UT
November 28, 2026*; 1:00 pm		at Southern Utah						America First Event Center; Cedar City, UT
December 2, 2026*; 6:00 pm		Fresno State						Jenny Craig Pavilion; San Diego, CA
December 5, 2026*; 2:00 pm		Grambling State						Jenny Craig Pavilion; San Diego, CA
December 12, 2026*; 11:00 am		Oral Roberts						Jenny Craig Pavilion; San Diego, CA
December 13, 2026*; 1:00 pm		Washington State						Jenny Craig Pavilion; San Diego, CA
December 19, 2026*; 11:00 am		at Utah State						Smith Spectrum; Logan, UT
December 21, 2026*; 1:00 pm		San Jose State						Jenny Craig Pavilion; San Diego, CA
WCC regular season
December 31, 2026; 1:00 pm		Saint Mary's						Jenny Craig Pavilion; San Diego, CA
January 2, 2027; 2:00 pm		San Francisco						Jenny Craig Pavilion; San Diego, CA
January 7, 2027; 6:00 pm		at Portland						Chiles Center; Portland, OR
January 9, 2027; 1:00 pm		at Seattle						Redhawk Center (nbsp;); Seattle, WA
January 14, 2027; 6:00 pm		Pacific						Jenny Craig Pavilion; San Diego, CA
January 16, 2027; TBA		at Denver						Hamilton Gymnasium; Denver, CO
January 21, 2027; 6:00 pm		Portland						Jenny Craig Pavilion; San Diego, CA
January 23, 2027; 2:00 pm		Loyola Marymount						Jenny Craig Pavilion; San Diego, CA
January 28, 2027; 7:00 pm		at Santa Clara						Leavey Center; Santa Clara, CA
January 30, 2027; 2:00 pm		at San Francisco						Sobrato Center; San Francisco, CA
February 4, 2027; 6:00 pm		Pepperdine						Jenny Craig Pavilion; San Diego, CA
February 6, 2027; 2:00 pm		Denver						Jenny Craig Pavilion; San Diego, CA
February 11, 2027; 6:30 pm		at Saint Mary's						University Credit Union Pavilion; Moraga, CA
February 13, 2027; 2:00 pm		at Pacific						Alex G. Spanos Center; Stockton, CA
February 18, 2027; 6:00 pm		Seattle						Jenny Craig Pavilion; San Diego, CA
February 20, 2027; 2:00 pm		at Loyola Marymount						Gersten Pavilion; Los Angeles, CA
February 25, 2027; 6:00 pm		at Pepperdine						Firestone Fieldhouse; Malibu, CA
February 27, 2027; 2:00 pm		Santa Clara						Jenny Craig Pavilion; San Diego, CA
WCC tournament
March 5-9, 2027; TBA		vs.						Orleans Arena; Paradise, NV
*Non-conference game. ^{#}Rankings from AP Poll. (#) Tournament seedings in parentheses. All times are in Pacific.
