= Liahona =

Liahona may refer to:

- Liahona (Book of Mormon), is a purported artifact described as a brass ball of "curious workmanship" that provided directions for Lehi and his party while traveling.
- Liahona (magazine), a periodical published by The Church of Jesus Christ of Latter-day Saints
- Liahona High School, a high school in Tonga owned by The Church of Jesus Christ of Latter-day Saints
- Liahona Preparatory Academy, an LDS private school in Pleasant Grove, Utah
- Liahona Academy, a privately owned troubled-teen program in Hurricane, Utah.
