= Longueuil (disambiguation) =

Longueuil is a city in the province of Quebec, Canada.

Longueuil may also refer to:

== Longueuil, Quebec ==
- Le Vieux-Longueuil, a borough in the city
  - Old Longueuil, a neighborhood in Le Vieux-Longueuil borough
- Longueuil (electoral district), former name of the federal electoral district Longueuil—Saint-Hubert
- Urban agglomeration of Longueuil, an urban agglomeration regrouping Longueuil and its seceded municipalities
- Longueuil–Université-de-Sherbrooke station, a subway station
- Place Longueuil, a shopping mall

== Other uses ==
- Baron de Longueuil, a French colonial title

== See also ==
- Longueil (disambiguation)
