= The Mountain at Mullin Park =

Arena and student center complex at Pepperdine University in Malibu, California

- Interactive map of The Mountain at Mullin Park
- Location: Pepperdine University; Malibu, California, U.S.
- Coordinates: 34.0432°N 118.7115°W
- Owner: Pepperdine University
- Operator: Pepperdine University
- Capacity: 3,600 (basketball and volleyball); 4,000 (other events)

Construction
- Groundbreaking: September 20, 2023
- Opened: December 5, 2026 (arena, scheduled); August 20, 2026 (student center)
- Cost: approximately $250 million
- Architects: Perkins&Will (design); Gruen Associates (executive architect, landscape)
- General contractor: Clark Construction

Tenants
- Pepperdine Waves men's basketball (2026–present); Pepperdine Waves women's basketball (2026–present); Pepperdine Waves volleyball (2026–present)

The Mountain at Mullin Park, and specifically the basketball arena known as Riptide Arena by fans, is an athletics, events and student wellness complex on the campus of Pepperdine University in Malibu, California. Its centerpiece is a 3,600-seat arena that is the new home of the university's men's and women's basketball teams and its volleyball teams, replacing Firestone Fieldhouse. The complex also includes a three-level student center that houses the university's RISE Institute and Campus Recreation, an 830-space parking structure, and Mullin Green, a landscaped park. Construction cost approximately $250 million.

The complex is associated with longtime Pepperdine benefactors Sharon and Terry Mullin, and the university has called it "an enduring monument" to their generosity. The student center opened on August 20, 2026. The Pepperdine men's basketball team is scheduled to play the first game in the arena on December 5, 2026, and the women's team the following day.

== History ==
=== Background ===
Pepperdine's basketball and volleyball teams had played at Firestone Fieldhouse, which opened in 1973. The new complex had been in planning for 21 years by the start of its final year of construction. Pepperdine described the project as a $150 million fundraising priority.

Terry Mullin, a Southern California lumber executive who died in 2023 at the age of 101, and his wife Sharon were longtime Pepperdine benefactors. At the donor ribbon-cutting for the student center in August 2026, the university named the Mullins as donors whose support helped bring the entire complex to life, and named Ruth B. Rubinstein as the donor of a cornerstone gift for the student center.

=== Construction ===
Pepperdine held a ground-breaking ceremony on September 20, 2023; speakers included university president Jim Gash and then-men's basketball head coach Lorenzo Romar. Work on the parking structure had begun in the spring of 2023, with the other facilities expected to start in 2024 and finish in the fall of 2026. The parking structure had opened by February 2025. The university held a topping-out ceremony in May 2025, marking completion of the structure's highest point.

The student center opened to students on August 20, 2026, after a donor ribbon-cutting on August 14. The Pepperdine men's basketball team began the 2026–27 season at Firestone Fieldhouse and is scheduled to move into the arena in December 2026. Firestone Fieldhouse is expected to remain in use as a practice facility and as offices for coaches.

== Design and facilities ==
=== Arena ===
The arena and event center covers 161,000 square feet (15,000 m^{2}) and seats 3,600 for NCAA Division I basketball and volleyball and 4,000 for other events. Perkins&Will was the design architect, and Gruen Associates was the executive architect and landscape architect. Clark Construction was the construction manager at risk, with Morley Builders as the structural concrete and steel contractor. The project is targeting LEED Silver certification. The arena sits on a plateau at the center of the student residential area, with views of the Santa Monica Mountains and the Pacific Ocean.

The arena has a 360-degree seating bowl with a center-hung LED video board, a club space overlooking the court and the ocean, two VIP viewing suites, premium seating that includes the Julie Cardwell Presidential Suite, locker rooms and team spaces, sports medicine facilities, a multi-activity court, and a café and patio that serve as a study area on non-game days. The university describes the video system as its first indoor, 360-degree, high-definition scoreboard and video system.

=== Student center and grounds ===
The three-level, 45,000-square-foot student center, known as the RISE building, houses the university's Resilience-Informed Skills Education (RISE) Institute and Campus Recreation. It has a fitness center with views of the Pacific Ocean, group exercise studios, bookable study and meeting rooms, outdoor balconies and the Rubinstein Student Commons on the third level. The grounds include an 830-space parking structure and Mullin Green, a park with an elevated plaza and amphitheater.

== Events ==
The Mountain is the home court of the Pepperdine Waves men's and women's basketball teams and the university's volleyball teams. The men's basketball team's first scheduled home game in the arena is against Florida Gulf Coast on December 5, 2026, followed by the women's team against Boise State on December 6.

The arena is also scheduled to host the Trinity vs. Mission League Challenge, a one-day high school basketball event between teams from the Trinity League and the Mission League, on December 22, 2026.

== See also ==
- Firestone Fieldhouse
- List of NCAA Division I basketball arenas
