= Jasmine Gill =

American basketball player

No. 23 – Torino
- Position: Shooting guard
- League: Serie A1

Personal information
- Born: October 7, 1990 (age 36) Greensboro, North Carolina
- Listed height: 185 cm (6 ft 1 in)

Career information
- High school: Walter H. Page (Greensboro, North Carolina)
- College: James Madison University (2009–2013)
- WNBA draft: 2013: undrafted
- Playing career: 2013–present

Career history
- 2013–2014: Primorje
- 2014: Partizan
- 2014–2015: Peli-Karhut
- 2015–2016: ICIM Arad
- 2016: Kilsyth LC
- 2016–2017: Telge Basket
- 2017: Sandringham Sabres
- 2017–present: Torino

Jasmine Gill (born 7 October 1990 in Greensboro, N. C., United States) is an American professional basketball player. In her career before Torino, she played for Primorje, Partizan, Peli-Karhut, ICIM Arad, Kilsyth LC, Telge Basket, and Sandringham Sabres.

== Boston College and James Madison statistics ==
Legend
GP	Games played	GS	Games started	MPG	Minutes per game
FG%	Field goal percentage	3P%	3-point field goal percentage	FT%	Free throw percentage
RPG	Rebounds per game	APG	Assists per game	SPG	Steals per game
BPG	Blocks per game	PPG	Points per game	**Bold**	Career high

Year	Team	GP	Points	FG%	3P%	FT%	RPG	APG	SPG	BPG	PPG
2008–09	Boston College	30	64	28.8%	25.0%	54.5%	1.3	0.4	0.2	0.1	2.1
2009–10	Boston College	32	208	**42.0%**	**38.5%**	68.1%	2.8	1.4	0.5	0.1	6.5
2010–11	Medical redshirt										
2011–12	James Madison	**37**	**332**	33.3%	17.9%	67.4%	**4.7**	**1.7**	0.7	0.1	**9.0**
2012–13	James Madison	19	96	24.8%	0.0%	**70.8%**	4.5	0.7	**0.9**	**0.1**	5.1
Career		118	492	33.7%	11.1%	67.4%	17.3	1.1	0.6	0.1	4.2
