= Jacie Hoyt =

American basketball coach (born 1987)

Current position
- Title: Head coach
- Team: Oklahoma State
- Conference: Big 12
- Record: 84–45 (.651)

Biographical details
- Born: April 2, 1987 (age 39); Ogallala, Nebraska, U.S.

Playing career
- 2005–2006: Colby CC
- 2006–2009: Wichita State

Coaching career (HC unless noted)
- 2009–2011: Fort Hays State (assistant)
- 2011–2014: Nevada (assistant)
- 2014–2017: Kansas State (assistant)
- 2017–2022: Kansas City
- 2022–present: Oklahoma State

Head coaching record
- Overall: 165–110 (.600)

Accomplishments and honors

Championships
- WAC regular season (2020)

Awards
- WAC Coach of the Year (2020)

Jacinta Renee Hoyt (born April 2, 1987) is the head women's college basketball coach for the Oklahoma State Cowgirls.

== Playing career ==
Hoyt attended Hoxie High School in Kansas and played for her mother, Shelly. Jacie was a three-time all-state selection in volleyball and basketball. She scored more than 2,000 points in her high school career and averaged more than 26 points per game. In her senior season she averaged 28 points, 7 assists, 6 rebounds, and 6 steals a game.

Hoyt then attended Colby Community College during her freshman season, playing seven games before breaking her ankle and ending her season. She then transferred to Wichita State, where she played the final three years of her career, starting every game of her junior and senior seasons. In her senior season, 2008–09, she led the Shockers with 71 assists, which ranked fourth in the Missouri Valley Conference.

She graduated magna cum laude from Wichita State.

=== Wichita State statistics ===
Ratios
Year	Team	GP	FG%	3P%	FT%	RBG	APG	BPG	SPG	PPG
2006–07	Wichita State	7	23.1%	–	94.4%	0.43	1.86	–	2.14	4.14
2007–08	Wichita State	31	26.0%	24.5%	69.3%	2.52	2.29	0.07	0.90	5.48
2008–09	Wichita State	31	32.0%	31.9%	53.5%	2.58	3.71	0.16	1.45	7.23
Career		69	29.0%	28.8%	67.6%	2.33	2.88	0.10	1.28	6.13

Totals
Year	Team	GP	FG	FGA	3P	3PA	FT	FTA	REB	A	BK	ST	PTS
2006–07	Wichita State	7	6	26	0	5	17	18	3	13	0	15	29
2007–08	Wichita State	31	53	204	12	49	52	75	78	71	2	28	170
2008–09	Wichita State	31	82	256	37	116	23	43	80	115	5	45	224
Career		69	141	486	49	170	92	136	161	199	7	88	423

== Coaching career ==
Hoyt started her coaching career at Fort Hays State before being reunited with her college coach, Jane Albright at Nevada. After three years with Nevada, she would join Kansas State and would help the team get to the WNIT and reach the NCAA tournament twice.

=== UMKC/Kansas City ===
Hoyt was named head coach of the UMKC Roos on May 11, 2017. In the 2019–20 season, the Roos won the WAC regular season and the first game of the 2020 WAC tournament before the rest of the tournament and all postseason tournaments were cancelled.

=== Oklahoma State ===
Hoyt was named the head coach of the Oklahoma State Cowgirls on March 20, 2022.

== Head coaching record ==
Record table
Season	Team	Overall	Conference	Standing	Postseason
Kansas City Roos (WAC) (2017–2020)
2017–18	UMKC	11–19	7–7	5th	
2018–19	UMKC	16–15	9–7	4th	
2019–20	Kansas City	21–10	13–3	1st	postseason not held
Kansas City Roos (Summit League) (2020–2022)
2020–21	Kansas City	10–12	7–8	4th	
2021–22	Kansas City	23–9	12–6	3rd	WNIT First Round
UMKC/Kansas City:		81–65 (.555)	48–31 (.608)		
Oklahoma State Cowgirls (Big 12) (2022–present)
2022–23	Oklahoma State	21–12	10–8	T–4th	NCAA First Round
2023–24	Oklahoma State	14–16	7–11	8th	
2024–25	Oklahoma State	25–7	14–4	3rd	NCAA First Round
2025–26	Oklahoma State	24–10	12–6	T–4th	NCAA Second Round
Oklahoma State:		84–45 (.651)	43–29 (.597)		
Total:		165–110 (.600)			
National champion Postseason invitational champion Conference regular season champion Conference regular season and conference tournament champion Division regular season champion Division regular season and conference tournament champion Conference tournament champion
