= Longueil =

Longueil may refer to:

Communes in France

- Longueil, Seine-Maritime, in the Seine-Maritime department
- Longueil-Annel, in the Oise department
- Longueil-Sainte-Marie, in the Oise department

People

- Christophe de Longueil, Belgian humanist
- René de Longueil, French minister in charge of finances under Louis XIII

== See also ==
- Longueuil, a city in Canada
- Longueuil (disambiguation)
