= Oklahoma State Cowgirls basketball =

Oklahoma State Cowgirls
2026–27 Oklahoma State Cowgirls basketball team
- University: Oklahoma State University
- Head coach: Jacie Hoyt (5th season)
- Location: Stillwater, Oklahoma
- Arena: Gallagher-Iba Arena (capacity: 13,611)
- Conference: Big 12
- Nickname: Cowgirls
- Colors: Orange and black

NCAA Division I tournament Sweet Sixteen
- 1991, 2008, 2014

NCAA Division I tournament appearances
- 1989, 1990, 1991, 1993, 1994, 1995, 1996, 2007, 2008, 2010, 2013, 2014, 2015, 2016, 2018, 2021, 2023, 2025, 2026

Conference tournament champions
- 1990, 1991

Conference regular-season champions
- 1991

Uniforms
Home	Away

The Oklahoma State Cowgirls basketball team represents Oklahoma State University–Stillwater and competes in the Big 12 Conference of NCAA Division I. The team's head coach is Jacie Hoyt, who was hired in March 2022. The Cowgirls play their home games in the Gallagher-Iba Arena in Stillwater, Oklahoma.

The Cowgirls have made 19 appearances in the NCAA tournament, reaching the Sweet Sixteen on three occasions. Oklahoma State has also won three conference titles, all of which came during their time in the Big Eight Conference.

== History ==
=== Early history (1972–1983) ===
The Oklahoma State Cowgirls first took the court during the 1973–74 season, when Oklahoma State defeated Cowley County CC 62–27 in the first game in program history. From the program's inception in 1973 until 1983, the Cowgirls were led by three separate head coaches in Dr. Jacy Showers, Brenda Johnson and Judy Bugher. Oklahoma State made numerous appearances in State and Regional AIAW tournaments, but were unable to ever made an appearance in the national AIAW women's basketball tournament.

=== Dick Halterman era (1983–2002) ===
Dick Halterman took over as head coach in the 1983–84 season. The Cowgirls immediately found sustained success under him, recording back-to-back winning seasons in his first two years as coach. Halterman would lead Oklahoma State to their first NCAA tournament appearance and victory in 1989, when the Cowgirls advanced to the Second Round after dominating Miami (FL). Oklahoma State would win their first conference title in 1990, defeating Kansas State in the championship game of the Big Eight tournament to claim the title. The Cowgirls would follow with one of the best seasons in program history in 1990–91, winning both the Big Eight regular season and conference tournament titles before advancing to the program's first Sweet Sixteen, knocking off DePaul and Michigan State at the 1991 NCAA tournament before falling to Virginia. Oklahoma State would make four more NCAA tournament appearances under Halterman, but would never again advance further than the Second Round. Halterman remains the most successful coach in Oklahoma State history, amassing 333 wins across 19 seasons.

=== Julie Goodenough era (2002–2005) ===
Julie Goodenough was hired in 2002 out of Hardin–Simmons, where she had found major success. The success was not replicated at Oklahoma State, as the Cowgirls went a combined 23–61 in the three years under Goodenough, including an abysmal 8–40 record in conference play. Goodenough resigned after the 2005 season.

=== Kurt Budke era (2005–2011) ===
Kurt Budke was hired out of Louisiana Tech in 2005, and brought Oklahoma State back to the NCAA tournament in just his second year as head coach. The Cowgirls won a program–record 27 games in the 2007–08 season, earning a 3 seed in the NCAA tournament before defeating East Tennessee State and Florida State to reach the second Sweet Sixteen in program history. Oklahoma State would again fail to advance further, falling to LSU to end the season. The Cowgirls would make an additional trip to the NCAA tournament in 2010, and Budke had just began his seventh season as head coach of the program before his tragic death in an airplane accident in 2011.

==== 2011 plane crash ====
On November 17, 2011, Budke died when the Piper Cherokee light aircraft he was traveling in crashed near Perryville, Arkansas, killing all four people on board. The airplane was piloted by former Oklahoma State Senator Olin Branstetter.

The subsequent investigation concluded that the pilot lost control of the aircraft, but the cause of the loss of control was undetermined. It was the second plane crash in 10 years to involve an Oklahoma State basketball team, after the 2001 accident in which two players on the men's team, six staff, and both pilots lost their lives.

=== Jim Littell era (2011–2022) ===
Jim Littell was thrust into the role of head coach following the tragic death of Budke in 2011, after serving as assistant coach at Oklahoma State since 2005. The Cowgirls overcame the tragic death of their head coach to record a winning record in the 2011–12 season and earn a trip to the Women's National Invitation Tournament. In the WNIT, Oklahoma State recorded wins over Central Arkansas, Wichita State, Missouri State and Colorado to reach the WNIT Semifinals. The Cowgirls would continue their postseason run following a dominant victory over San Diego, punching their ticket to the championship game. Oklahoma State would go on to win the 2012 WNIT Championship over James Madison, 75–68. The 2012 WNIT title was the first postseason title in Cowgirl basketball history. Oklahoma State would ride the momentum into four straight appearances in the NCAA tournament, including the third Sweet Sixteen appearance in program history during the 2013–14 season. Littell would lead the Cowgirls to additional NCAA tournament appearances in the 2017–18 and 2020–21 seasons, but would struggle to maintain consistency or make deep postseason runs. In 2022, Littell agreed to part ways with Oklahoma State after 11 years as head coach.

=== Jacie Hoyt era (2022–present) ===
Jacie Hoyt was hired as head coach in 2022, previously coaching at Kansas City. Hoyt led Oklahoma State to the NCAA tournament in her first season as coach, where the Cowgirls fell by a point to Miami (FL) in a heartbreaking loss. After a disappointing 2023–24 season, Oklahoma State recorded 14 conference wins in 2024–25, setting a program record. Despite a first round exit in the NCAA tournament, the Cowgirls finished the year ranked for the first time in over a decade. In 2025–26, Hoyt led Oklahoma State to the first NCAA tournament win under her leadership, guiding the Cowgirls to an 82–68 victory over Princeton in the First Round.

== Roster ==
2026–27 Oklahoma State Cowgirls women's basketball team
Players
Coaches

Pos.	#	Name	Height	Year	Previous school	Hometown
G	32	Stailee Heard	5 ft 11 in (1.8 m)	Sr	Sapulpa	Sapulpa, OK (United States) (Oklahoma)
G	tbd	Ellie Bruggemann	5 ft 11 in (1.8 m)	Sr	Lindenwood	Owasso, OK (United States) (Oklahoma)
G	tbd	Zoe Canfield	5 ft 11 in (1.8 m)	Jr	Missouri State	Topeka, KS (United States) (Kansas)
C	tbd	Audi Crooks	6 ft 3 in (1.91 m)	Sr	Iowa State	Algona, IA (United States) (Iowa)
F	tbd	Annie Kibedi	6 ft 2 in (1.88 m)	Fr	Topsportschool Wilrijk	Boom, Belgium (Antwerp Province)
G	tbd	Liv McGill	5 ft 9 in (1.75 m)	Jr	Florida	Minneapolis, MN (United States) (Minnesota)
F	tbd	Nene Ndiaye	6 ft 1 in (1.85 m)	Sr	Rutgers	Saly, Senegal
F	tbd	Bralyn Peck	6 ft 2 in (1.88 m)	Fr	Decatur	Decatur, TX (United States) (Texas)
G	tbd	LA Sneed	5 ft 6 in (1.68 m)	So	Utah	San Antonio, TX (United States) (Texas)
G	tbd	Talexa Weeter	6 ft 0 in (1.83 m)	Sr	Fort Hays State	Goodland, KS (United States) (Kansas)

Head coach

- Jacie Hoyt (Wichita State)

Assistant coach(es)

- Kelby Jones (North Texas)
- Mandi Carver (Idaho State)
- Ashley Davis (TCU)
- Robyne Bostick (Saint Joseph's)
- Terran Hoyt (Nebraska–Kearney)

Legend

- (C) Team captain
- (S) Suspended
- (I) Ineligible
- (W) Walk-on
- Injured
- Current redshirt

== Year-by-year results ==
Conference tournament winners noted with # Source

Season	Team	Overall	Conference	Standing	Postseason	Coaches' poll	AP poll
Jacy Showers (Independent) (1972–1976)
1972–73	Jacy Showers	8–8	–				
1973–74	Jacy Showers	10–9	–		Regional AIAW		
1974–75	Jacy Showers	15–6	–		Regional AIAW		
1975–76	Jacy Showers	17–7	–		Regional AIAW		
Jacy Showers:		50–30	–				
Brenda Johnson (Independent) (1976–1977)
1976–77	Brenda Johnson	12–13	–		Regional AIAW		
Brenda Johnson:		12–13	–				
Judy Bugher (Independent, Big 8) (1977–1983)
1977–78	Judy Bugher	17–14	–		State AIAW		
1978–79	Judy Bugher	17–10	–		Regional AIAW		
1979–80	Judy Bugher	19–13	–		State AIAW		
1980–81	Judy Bugher	14–15	–		State AIAW		
1981–82	Judy Bugher	18–13	–		Regional AIAW		
Big Eight Conference
1982–83	Judy Bugher	4–23	1–13	8th			
Judy Bugher:		89–88	1–13				
Dick Halterman (Big 8, Big 12) (1983–2002)
1983–84	Dick Halterman	18–11	8–6	4th			
1984–85	Dick Halterman	17–11	9–5	T-3rd			
1985–86	Dick Halterman	13–18	2–12	8th			
1986–87	Dick Halterman	16–12	7–7	5th			
1987–88	Dick Halterman	17–11	7–7	T-5th			
1988–89	Dick Halterman	20–12	8–6	2nd	NCAA Second Round (Play-In)		
1989–90	Dick Halterman	20–11	9–5	T-4th#	NCAA First Round		
1990–91	Dick Halterman	27–6	11–3	1st#	NCAA Sweet Sixteen	16	25
1991–92	Dick Halterman	11–17	6–8	6th			
1992–93	Dick Halterman	23–9	9–5	T-3rd	NCAA First Round		25
1993–94	Dick Halterman	20–9	9–5	3rd	NCAA First Round		
1994–95	Dick Halterman	17–12	7–7	4th	NCAA First Round		
1995–96	Dick Halterman	20–10	8–6	T-3rd	NCAA Second Round		
Big 12 Conference
1996–97	Dick Halterman	15–12	7–9	T-8th (Big 12)			
1997–98	Dick Halterman	20–11	10–6	T-5th	WNIT Quarterfinals		
1998–99	Dick Halterman	13–15	4–12	11th			
1999–2000	Dick Halterman	14–16	5–11	9th			
2000–01	Dick Halterman	16–15	6–10	9th	WNIT Quarterfinals		
2001–02	Dick Halterman	16–15	7–9	8th			
Dick Halterman:		333–233	139–139				
Julie Goodenough (Big 12) (2002–2005)
2002–03	Julie Goodenough	8–21	3–13	T-9th			
2003–04	Julie Goodenough	8–20	3–13	10th			
2004–05	Julie Goodenough	7–20	2–14	T-11th			
Julie Goodenough:		23–61	8–40				
Kurt Budke (Big 12) (2005–2012)
2005–06	Kurt Budke	6–22	0–16	12th			
2006–07	Kurt Budke	20–11	8–8	6th	NCAA First Round		
2007–08	Kurt Budke	27–8	11–5	T-3rd	NCAA Sweet Sixteen	11	13
2008–09	Kurt Budke	17–16	4–12	T-10th	WNIT First Round (Play-In)		
2009–10	Kurt Budke	24–11	9–7	T-6th	NCAA Second Round	22	20
2010–11	Kurt Budke	17–15	4–12	11th	WNIT Second Round		
2011	Kurt Budke	1–0	–		Died November 17, 2011 in plane crash		
Kurt Budke:		112–83	36–60				
Jim Littell (Big 12) (2011–2022)
2011–12	Jim Littell	21–12	8–10	T-6th	WNIT Champions		
2012–13	Jim Littell	22–11	9–9	T-5th	NCAA Second Round		
2013–14	Jim Littell	25–9	11–7	T-3rd	NCAA Sweet Sixteen	21	18
2014–15	Jim Littell	20–12	9–9	T–3rd	NCAA First Round		
2015–16	Jim Littell	21–10	11–7	T-4th	NCAA First Round		
2016–17	Jim Littell	17–15	6–12	7th	WNIT First Round		
2017–18	Jim Littell	21–11	11–7	T-3rd	NCAA Second Round		
2018–19	Jim Littell	14–16	5–13	7th			
2019–20	Jim Littell	15–15	6–12	8th	NCAA Tournament cancelled due to COVID-19 pandemic		
2020-21	Jim Littell	19–9	13–5	3rd	NCAA Second Round		
2021-22	Jim Littell	9–20	3–15	9th			
Jim Littell:		204–140	92–106				
Jacie Hoyt (Big 12) (2022–present)
2022–23	Jacie Hoyt	21–12	10–8	T-4th	NCAA First Round		
2023–24	Jacie Hoyt	14–16	7–11	8th			
2024–25	Jacie Hoyt	25–7	14–4	3rd	NCAA First Round	24	22
2025–26	Jacie Hoyt	24–10	12–6	T-4th	NCAA Second Round		
Jacie Hoyt:		84–45	43–29				
Total:		858–676					
National champion Postseason invitational champion Conference regular season champion Conference regular season and conference tournament champion Division regular season champion Division regular season and conference tournament champion Conference tournament champion

== Postseason ==
=== NCAA tournament results ===
The Cowgirls have appeared in the NCAA tournament 19 times. Their combined record is 13–19.

Year	Seed	Round	Opponent	Result
1989	(9)	First Round; Second Round	#8 Miami (FL) #1 Louisiana Tech	W 93–69; L 78−103
1990	(7)	First Round	#10 Michigan	L 68−77
1991	(5)	First Round; Second Round; Sweet Sixteen	#12 DePaul #4 Michigan State #1 Virginia	W 81–80; W 96−94 (3OT); L 61–76
1993	(10)	First Round	#7 SW Missouri State	L 71−86
1994	(12)	First Round	#5 Texas	L 67−75
1995	(12)	First Round	#5 Duke	L 64−76
1996	(7)	First Round; Second Round	#10 Rhode Island #2 Georgia	W 90–82; L 55−83
2007	(10)	First Round	#7 Bowling Green	L 66−70
2008	(3)	First Round; Second Round; Sweet Sixteen	#14 ETSU #11 Florida State #2 LSU	W 85–73; W 73−72 (OT); L 52–67
2010	(4)	First Round; Second Round	#13 Chattanooga #5 Georgia	W 70–63; L 71−74 (OT)
2013	(7)	First Round; Second Round	#10 DePaul #2 Duke	W 73–56; L 59−68
2014	(5)	First Round; Second Round; Sweet Sixteen	#12 Florida Gulf Coast #4 Purdue #1 Notre Dame	W 61–60 (OT); W 73−66; L 72–89
2015	(10)	First Round	#7 Florida Gulf Coast	L 67−75
2016	(7)	First Round	#10 St. Bonaventure	L 54−65
2018	(9)	First Round; Second Round	#8 Syracuse #1 Mississippi State	W 84–57; L 56−71
2021	(8)	First Round; Second Round	#9 Wake Forest #1 Stanford	W 84–61; L 62−73
2023	(8)	First Round	#9 Miami (FL)	L 61−62
2025	(7)	First Round	#10 South Dakota State	L 68–74
2026	(8)	First Round; Second Round	#9 Princeton #1 UCLA	W 82−68; L 68−87

=== WNIT results ===
The Cowgirls have appeared in the Women's National Invitation Tournament (NIT) six times. Their combined record is 11–5. They were WNIT champions in 2012.

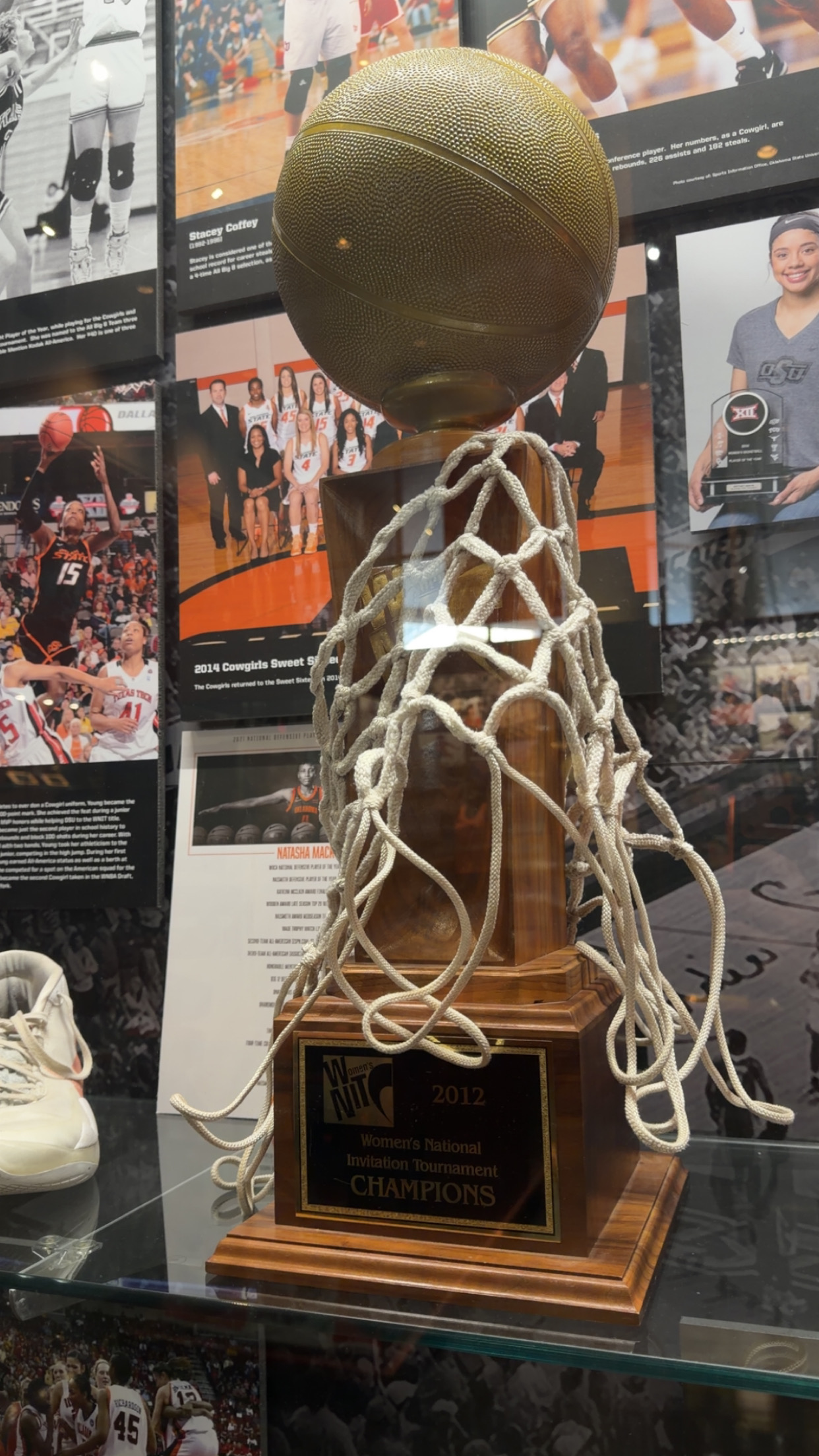
2012 WNIT Trophy won by Oklahoma State

Year	Round	Opponent	Result
1998	1st Round; 2nd Round	Rice; Baylor	W 75–52; L 47–54
2001	1st Round; 2nd Round; Quarterfinals	North Texas; UNLV; Hawaii	W 79–67; W 71–67; L 51–52
2009	1st Round; 2nd Round	UT Arlington; Arkansas	W 82–72; L 60–61^{OT}
2011	First Round; 2nd Round	Pepperdine; Wyoming	W 81–74; L 71–75
2012	First Round; Second Round; 3rd Round; Quarterfinals; Semifinals; Final	Central Arkansas; Wichita State; Missouri State; Colorado; San Diego; James Madison	W 72–51; W 63–44; W 70–57; W 78–70; W 73–57; W 75–68
2017	First Round	Abilene Christian	L 56–66

== Cowgirls drafted in WNBA ==
- Andrea Riley, drafted 1st round, 8th overall by the Los Angeles Sparks in the 2010 WNBA draft
- Toni Young, drafted 1st round, 7th overall by the New York Liberty in the 2013 WNBA draft
- Tiffany Bias, drafted 2nd round, 15th overall by the Phoenix Mercury in the 2014 WNBA draft
- Brittney Martin, drafted 3rd round, 25th overall by the San Antonio Stars in the 2016 WNBA draft
- Loryn Goodwin, drafted 2nd round, 18th overall by the Dallas Wings in the 2018 WNBA draft
- Natasha Mack drafted 2nd round, 16th overall by the Chicago Sky in 2021 WNBA draft
