= Liahona Preparatory Academy =

Coordinates: 40°22′20″N 111°44′10″W

Location
- 2464 W 450 S, Pleasant Grove, Utah 84062; Pleasant Grove, Utah; Utah County, Utah 84062; United States

Information
- School type: Private
- Religious affiliation: The Church of Jesus Christ of Latter-day Saints (LDS)
- Established: Jan 01, 1997
- Founder: Brent and Kolleen Degraff
- Status: Open
- Grades: K-12
- Gender: Coeducational
- Enrollment: 171 (2021–22)
- Language: English
- Campuses: 1
- Campus type: Suburban
- Team name: Warriors
- Accreditations: Cognia (formerly AdvancED)
- Website: Official website

Liahona Preparatory Academy is a tuition-funded private school offering instruction to students through their online distance education program hosted on Cognia and at their physical campus. The school is named after a reported artifact described in The Church of Jesus Christ of Latter-day Saints (LDS) scripture The Book of Mormon which adherents believe functioned as a compass. The school's curriculum centers around LDS-based “Restorative Education” principles.

As of 2024, Liahona Preparatory Academy had an average ACT score of 25, below the average score of 27 for Utah private high schools, tying for #11 out of 13 private high schools in Utah, based on ACT scores.

== Restoration Education ==
Restoration Education at Liahona Preparatory Academy integrates Latter-day Saint (LDS) doctrines into its academic curriculum.

== Extracurriculars ==
=== Athletics ===
As of 2024, Liahona Preparatory Academy is part of the Utah School Sports Alliance (USSA), and the Utah High School Activities Association (UHSAA). Their teams are called the "Liahona Warriors".

=== Theatre ===
Liahona's theatre department produces 3-6 shows each year in their on-campus black box theater. Liahona's High-school division won the Utah Shakespeare Festival 1st place sweepstakes in 2014, 2016, 2017, and 2018. Their Jr. High team won the Utah Shakespeare Festival 1st place sweepstakes in 2015, and 2016.

=== Trips ===
Each year, Liahona students have the opportunity to attend a week-long, chaperoned youth conference at BYU's family campground in Aspen Grove. Additionally, students can occasionally participate in service trips to various locations, previous trips included; the Mexico Yucatán area, a Navajo reservation, and the Philippines. The school also organizes paid sight-seeing "super trips" to destinations such as Boston, Washington D.C., Philadelphia, Mexico, and Gettysburg. Prom is held annually for students aged 14 and older.

== Controversy ==
In 2013, Broch Clyde DeGraff, the son of Brent and Kolleen DeGraff, founders of Liahona Preparatory Academy, was arrested for sexually abusing two 16-year-old female students. The abuse occurred between October 2011 and June 2012 and involved grooming, text messages, and physical encounters at both the school and DeGraff's home. DeGraff, who was a teacher and the soccer coach at the school, was in a position of trust and authority, which he exploited to commit his offenses. Broch DeGraff pleaded guilty to two counts of forcible sexual abuse and four counts of attempted sexual abuse, and was sentenced to up to 20 years in prison.
