= Ritchie Center =

University of Denver athletics center in Colorado, United States

Coordinates: 39.681950°N 104.961849°W

Daniel L. Ritchie Center
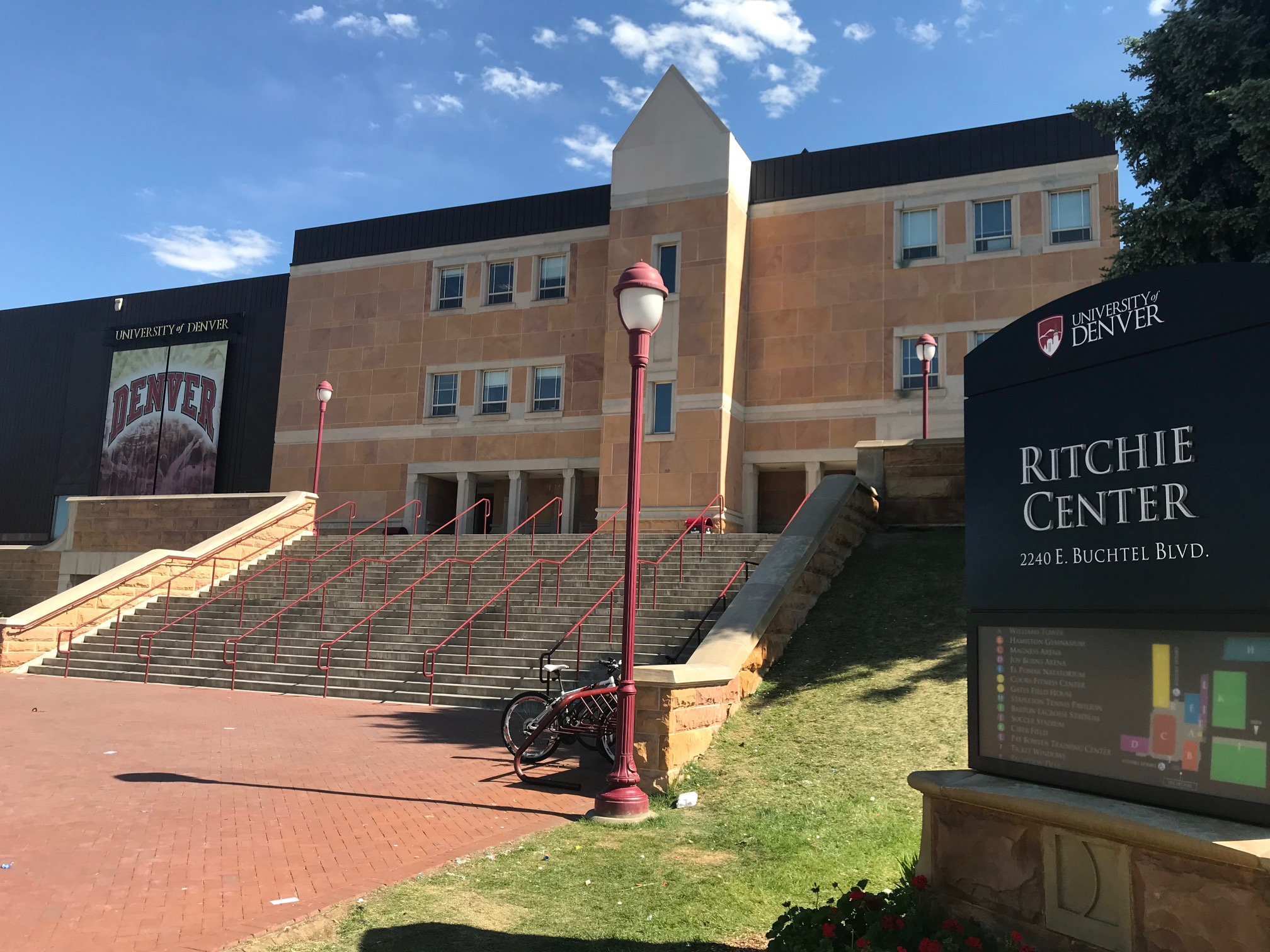
- Interactive map of Daniel L. Ritchie Center
- Address: 2240 E. Buchtel Blvd.
- Location: Denver, Colorado
- Owner: University of Denver

Tenant
- Denver Pioneers (NCAA)

The Daniel L. Ritchie Center is the home of athletics for the University of Denver in Denver, Colorado, United States. There are 17 athletic programs for the Denver Pioneers which run out of the Ritchie Center. The 440,000 square feet (41,000 m^{2}) building cost $84 million to construct. Each of the 17 athletic programs have offices located on the fourth floor, along with the Gottesfeld room, which hosts a great deal of dinners and meetings. In addition, the third floor has offices for athletic advisors and other faculty members.

== Daniel L. Ritchie ==
Daniel L. Ritchie served as the 16th chancellor of the University of Denver from 1989 to 2005. He was then the chairman of the board of the University of Denver from 2005 to 2007. Ritchie donated $15 million to the University of Denver in 1994, and has since given the remainder of his ranch to the university. The proceeds from the ranch land have provided over $50 million for various projects at the university. Ritchie now serves as the chairman and chief executive officer of The Denver Center of Performing Arts, among other roles in various foundations and associations.

== New features ==
The Ritchie Center has two new features that have further improved it. Currently it has a new weight room (Pat Bowlen Strength & Conditioning Facility) located under the new soccer stadium. Adjacent is the Haefner Media Suite with theatre seating for 50 and a state of the art videowall for scount and skill development video work. In addition to weight-training facilities, the new weight room has a 65-yard turf area in the middle to run on. The weight room is 10,000 square feet (930 m^{2}) and is located on the bottom level of the Ritchie Center under the new soccer stadium. The new soccer stadium allows games to be viewed much more easily and had a videoboard installed in 2025. It holds up to 2,000 people and is a major upgrade to what the Pioneers had before it was created.

== Coors Fitness Center ==
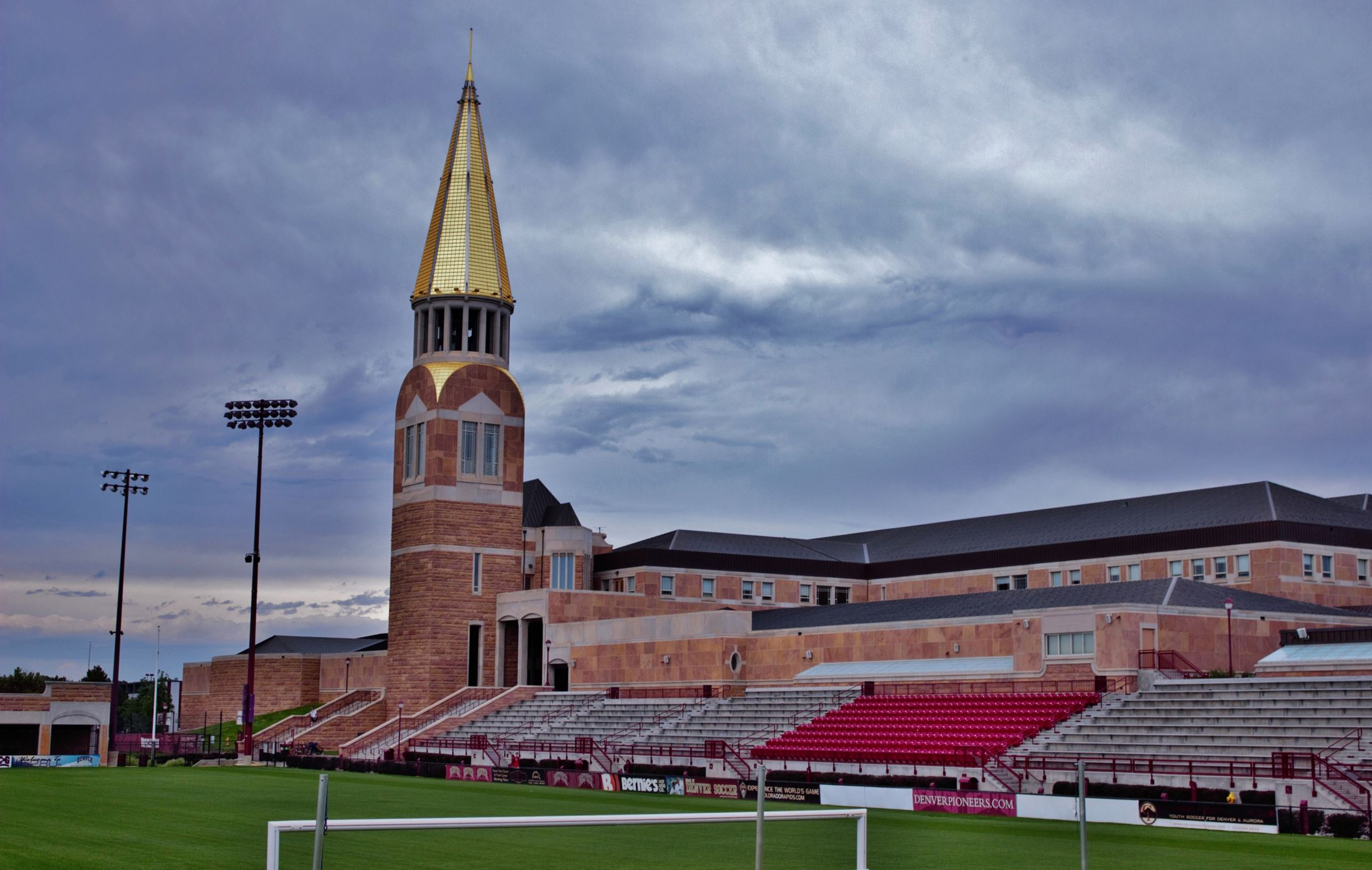
Exterior of the Daniel L. Ritchie Center

The Coors Fitness Center includes:

- A 14,500-square-foot (1,350 m^{2}) work out area
- A squash court and two racquetball courts
- Seven personal training studios
- Six outdoor lighted tennis courts
- A two-story climbing wall

More than 345,000 people visited the Coors Fitness Center in the 2005–2006 academic year. The Coors Fitness Center opened in 1999 and offers membership to Denver-area residents along with its undergraduate and graduate students. The Coors Fitness Center offers various types of cardio and weight lifting options and the option of working with Degreed and Nationally Certified Personal Trainers and/or a Life Style Coach. The Ritchie Center offers several different membership types such as DU Alumni Memberships, DU Young Alumni Memberships, Public Memberships, DU Faculty and Staff Memberships, and Part-Time DU Student Memberships. The Coors Fitness Center hires many full and part-time students as employees, providing job opportunity and experience for many DU students.

The Coors Fitness Center offers a variety of luxuries in the Gold Club Members locker rooms. The Coors Center's general locker rooms each have approximately 400 half-size metal lockers. The Gold Club, which costs $30 a month, and lockers in the general locker rooms for a fee, in this case $15 a month.

The Coors Fitness Center was remodeled in the summer of 2008 at an estimated cost of $250,000. The front entrance of the fitness center was relocated to the southwest corner of the Ritchie Center. Inside the gym the front desk was moved to the front of the newly located entrance, in order to make more room for exercise equipment. A grab-and-go snack facility was also set up by the entrance, serving coffee and healthy snacks, in which students are able to use meal plan cash to purchase food at the snack facility. An apparel shop was also set up next to the snack facility.

== El Pomar Natatorium ==
The El Pomar Natatorium is Denver's only Olympic-sized swimming pool. The swimming facility offers various types of swimming programs every week and as a DU Student, Alumni, Faculty, or Staff member, the Coors Fitness Center offers either complimentary or reduced fees for pool programs.

A Coors Fitness Center membership allows full use of the pool, but also offers a Pool Only Access Membership for those only interested in swimming. This type of membership allows people to utilize the swimming pool for lap swim, but does not allow access to the other services included with a Coors Fitness Center membership like fitness classes. This 30,000-square-foot (2,800 m^{2}) natatorium contains two three-meter and two one-meter springboards. The facility also provides permanent seating for about 300 people and additional temporary seating when necessary.

The depth of the pool ranges from four feet to 14 feet (4.3 m) and holds a volume of about 700,000 gallons.

The El Pomar foundation donated $2 million in 1995 to University of Denver for the construction of the El Pomar Natatorium.

== Hamilton Gymnasium ==
Hamilton Gymnasium is a 2,500-seat gymnasium that serves as the home of Denver's volleyball program and both men's and women's basketball teams. The gym is connected to Magness Arena via a common lobby area. When not in use for athletics, the seats can be rolled back exposing three full-sized basketball courts for general recreation. Hamilton previously served as the home of Pioneer gymnastics until 2019; the program's increased success saw them move select meets to Magness Arena to accommodate larger crowds, and beginning in 2021 their full home schedule was transferred over to the larger facility. Basketball, previously played at Magness, moved to Hamilton in 2021 to provide a more intimate atmosphere.

== Health Center ==
The Health & Counseling Center is an on-campus facility that provides a wide range of medical and mental health services. The Health & Counseling Center has a variety assortment of medical professionals including, physicians, nurses, psychologists, nurse practitioners, and physician assistants. All students enrolled for academic credit full-time or part-time, undergraduate or graduate are eligible for Health and Counseling services. The Health and Counseling center also offers learning opportunities for the University of Denver's graduate students. For more than 30 years, the Professional Psychology Center has paired doctoral level graduate students who treat clients with licensed professionals who provide intensive supervision.

== Magness Arena and Joy Burns Ice Arena ==
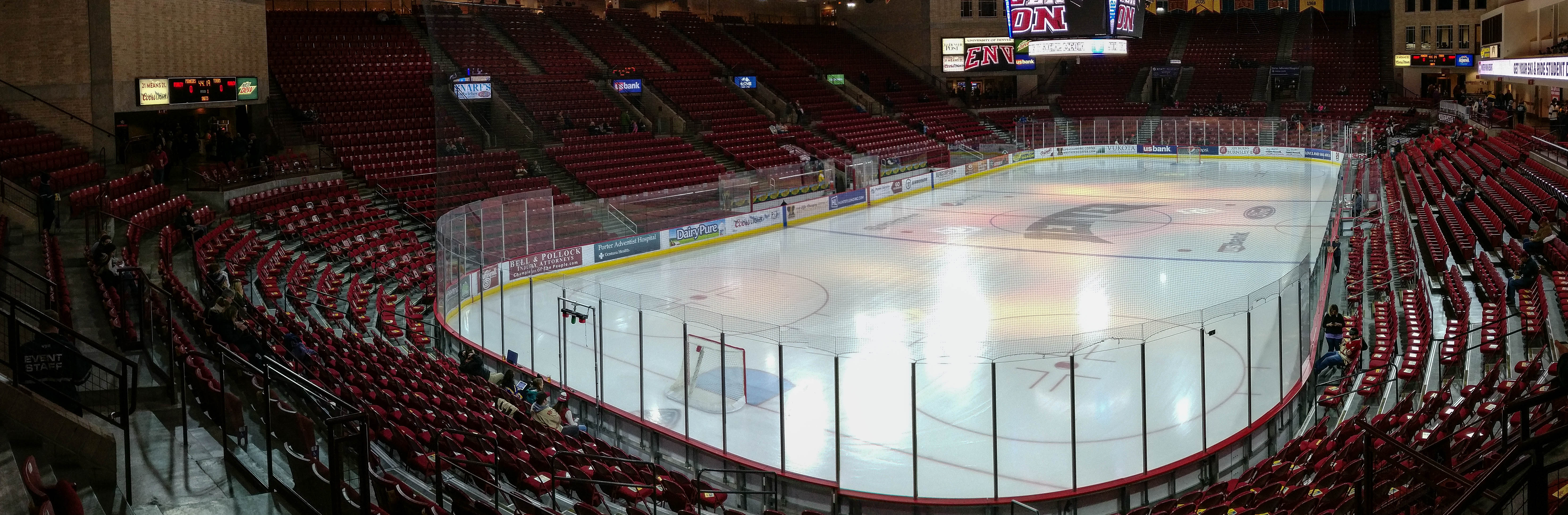
Magness Arena looking northwest

Magness Arena is home to the University of Denver's hockey and gymnastics teams. It contains 6,026 theater-style seats for hockey or gymnastics and 8,000 for concerts.

Joy Burns Ice Arena serves as a practice rink for the university's men's and women's hockey teams. It is also where figure skating practices and public skate sessions are held, and is home to the Jr. Pioneers youth hockey program.

== Noteworthy events ==
In 2008, President Barack Obama and former president Bill Clinton were at the Ritchie Center to give speeches prior to Colorado's caucus.

In 2009, there was a regional FIRST Robotics Competition tournament, as well as a world cup stacking competition, the World Sport Stacking Championships.
