= UCF Knights women's basketball =

UCF Knights
2026–27 UCF Knights women's basketball team
- University: University of Central Florida
- First season: 1977–78
- Head coach: Gabe Lazo (1st season)
- Location: Orlando, Florida
- Arena: Addition Financial Arena (capacity: 9,432)
- Conference: Big 12
- Nickname: Knights
- Colors: Black and gold
- Student section: Knightmare
- All-time record: 655–647 (.503)

NCAA Division I tournament second round
- 2022

NCAA Division I tournament appearances
- NCAA Division I 1996, 1999, 2009, 2011, 2019, 2021, 2022 NCAA Division II; 1983, 1984

Conference tournament champions
- Sunshine State Conference; 1982, 1983, 1984 TAAC; 1996, 1999 Conference USA; 2009, 2011 The American; 2022

Conference regular-season champions
- 1982, 1983, 1984, 1999, 2003, 2005, 2022

Uniforms
Home	Away

The UCF Knights women's basketball team represents the University of Central Florida located in Orlando, Florida in the National Collegiate Athletic Association (NCAA) Division I and the Big 12 Conference. The Knights play their home games at Addition Financial Arena located on the university's main campus.

The Knights have participated in the NCAA/AIAW Tournament eight times, five as a Division I team and three times as a Division II program. The team reached the Elite Eight in 1982, and won the 1980 AIAW Division-II Florida State Championship, before losing their first game in the national tournament.

== History ==
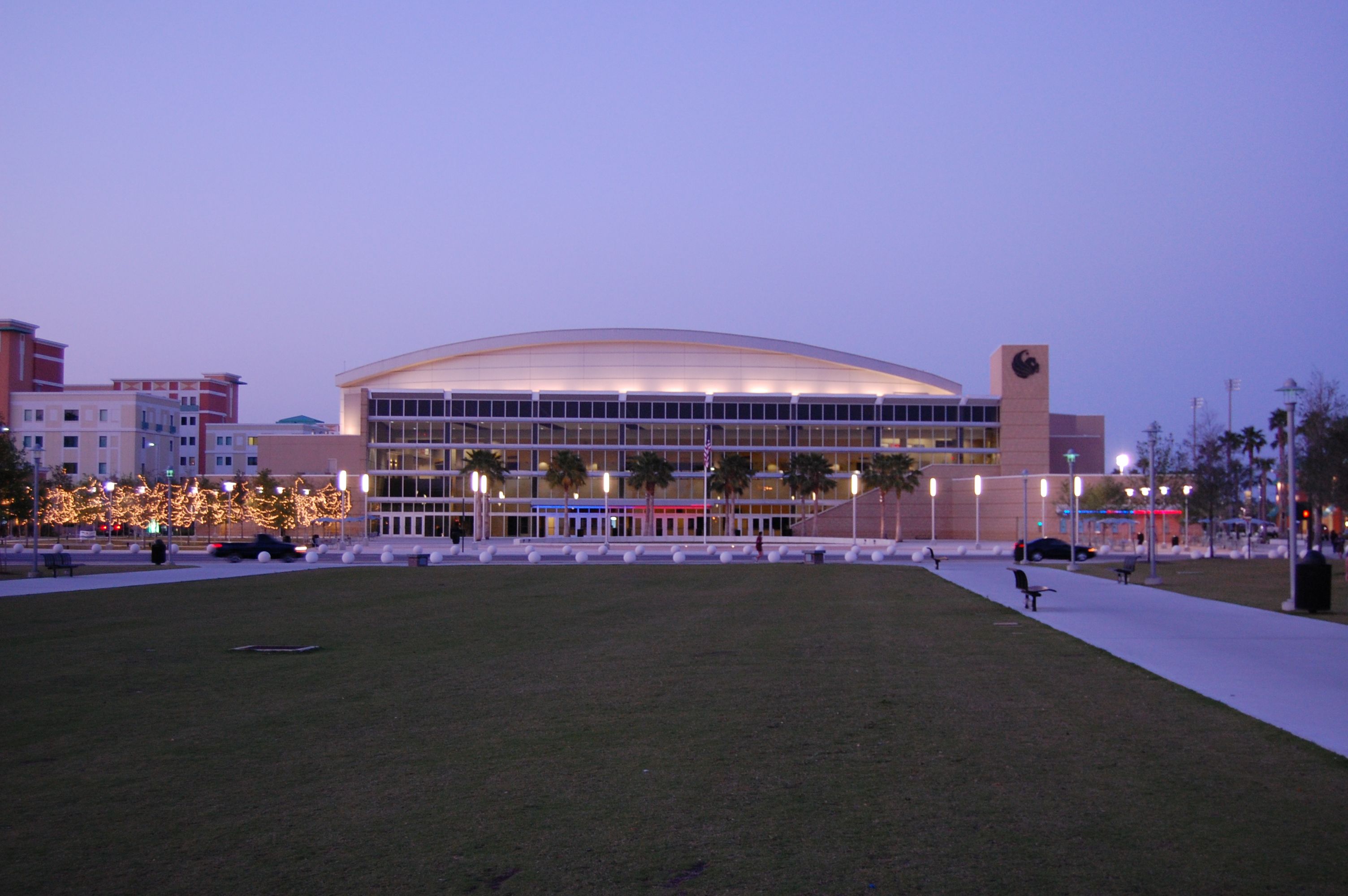
The CFE Arena, home to the Knights basketball teams

UCF first competed in AIAW during the 1977–78 season as a Division II team. During the 1979–80 season, the Knights had a record of 23–9 and won the AIAW D–II Small College Florida State Championship. Although the college was a member of the Sunshine State Conference, it did not organize a women's basketball team within the conference until 1981. They moved up to AIAW Division I in 1981–82, the last year of AIAW, and advanced to the Division I Tournament quarterfinals.

They moved to the NCAA during the 1982–83 season, initially in Division II, along with the rest of the Sunshine State Conference. They were promoted to Division I during 1984–85 season. During the three years the team played in the Sunshine State Conference, the Knights won both the conference regular season title and the tournament title every year. During their first year in NCAA Division I, they had a 20–10 record, but were not given a tournament bid since they were a non-conference team that year.

The team struggled in Division I New South Women's Athletic Conference (NSWAC) until 1990. After playing in the American South Conference in 1990–91 season, which merged into the Sun Belt Conference soon after, the team landed in the Trans-American Athletic Conference (TAAC) during 1992–93 season. In 1995–96 season, the Knights surprised everybody by winning the TAAC Tournament, and making their first appearance in the NCAA women's basketball tournament (though they were eliminated in the first round).

In 1996–97 season, UCF hired Lynn Bria as their women's basketball head coach, and the team began to see more success. During the 1998–99 season, the Knights finally won the TAAC regular season title with a 13–3 record and the Conference tournament, allowing the team to enter the NCAA Tournament a second time. After their NCAA Tournament ouster, Bria was replaced as head coach by Gail Striegler.

After two years of struggling, Striegler put together a string of four winning seasons in what had become the Atlantic Sun Conference in the 2001–02 season. The team won the Atlantic Sun regular season title in 2002–03 and 2004–05, but failed to win the Conference tournament, and thus never played in the NCAA Tournament during those years.

In 2005–06, the Knights moved to Conference USA, and the women's basketball team struggled mightily, resulting in Striegler being fired and replaced by Joi Williams. The team continued to struggle in 2007–08 with a 10–20 record and a last place showing in the conference. But after a 2–11 start in 2008–09, they surprised C-USA by dominating, tying with four other teams with the second-best in-conference record of 11–5 (falling to the fifth seed due to their out-of-conference woes). In the Conference USA Tournament, they beat Rice (66–64), Houston (79–66) and SMU (62–51) in order to face Southern Miss in the Championship game. After playing to a 52–52 tie in regulation, the Knights dominated the overtime period, 13–2, to win the game, 65–54. It was UCF's first C-USA title, allowing the team to enter the NCAA Tournament a third time. Ranked No. 14 in the 2009 NCAA tournament, they surprised the No. 3 North Carolina Tar Heels, but ultimately lost 85–80.

After floundering during the 2009–10 season (10–15, 7–9), the Knights dominated the conference schedule in 2010–11 (22–10, 12–4), finishing 2nd in the regular season and winning their second C-USA title along with their fourth NCAA tournament appearance. The seasons afterwards, however, brought struggles for the program, especially with the transition into the American Athletic Conference (The American) in 2013. After a 7–23 2015–16 season, Joi Williams was dismissed.

UCF went on to hire Albany head coach Katie Abrahamson-Henderson. In her first year in 2016–17, Coach Abe instantly improved the team with a 21–12 record as well as the program's first WNIT appearance, where they advanced to the second round. In the 2018–19 season, UCF went 26–7 and finished second place in the conference, only losing to UConn in the Tournament Championship. The Knights had their first NCAA Tournament bid since 2010–11 that year, and their fifth overall. In 2020–21, UCF finished second place in the conference, but fell short to their rivals, USF. That season, UCF made their sixth NCAA appearance.

The 2021–22 season was record-breaking for UCF, with the Knights going 26–4 and being ranked in both polls for the first time in school history. UCF also won their first regular season championship since 2004–05. In the AAC Tournament, UCF beat Tulsa (69–54) and dominated SMU (61–28) before facing their rival, USF, in a championship rematch from the season before. After being down for three quarters, UCF took over in the 4th quarter, at one point going on a 12–1 run, and won their first AAC Tournament title (53–45) as well as their first conference tournament victory since 2010–11, clinching a 7th NCAA Tournament appearance. Furthermore, in the NCAA Tournament, UCF advanced to the second round for the first time in school history with a 69–52 victory over Florida, and fell just short to UConn, losing 52–47.

On March 26, 2022, Coach Abe left the Knights to take the head coach position at her alma mater, Georgia. She was replaced by Sytia Messer, the associate head coach at LSU and previously a head coach at Tennessee Tech. Messer won the national championship in 2019 as an assistant with Baylor, and made the Final Four as a player with Arkansas in 1998.

== Postseason ==
=== NCAA Division I tournament results ===
UCF has reached the NCAA Division I women's basketball tournament seven times. They have a record of 1–7.

Year	Seed	Round	Opponent	Result
1996	#16	First round	(1) Louisiana Tech	L 41–98
1999	#16	First round	(1) Louisiana Tech	L 48–90
2009	#14	First round	(3) UNC	L 80–85
2011	#13	First round	(4) Ohio State	L 69–80
2019	#12	First round	(5) Arizona State	L 45–60
2021	#10	First round	(7) Northwestern	L 51–62
2022	#7	First round Second Round	(10) Florida (2) UConn	W 69–52; L 47–52

=== NCAA Division II tournament results ===
The Knights, then known as the Golden Knights, made two appearances in the NCAA Division II women's basketball tournament. They had a combined record of 0–2.

Year	Round	Opponent	Result
1983	First round	Tuskegee	L, 68–83
1984	First round	Bentley	L, 44–61

== Traditions ==
=== Knightmare ===
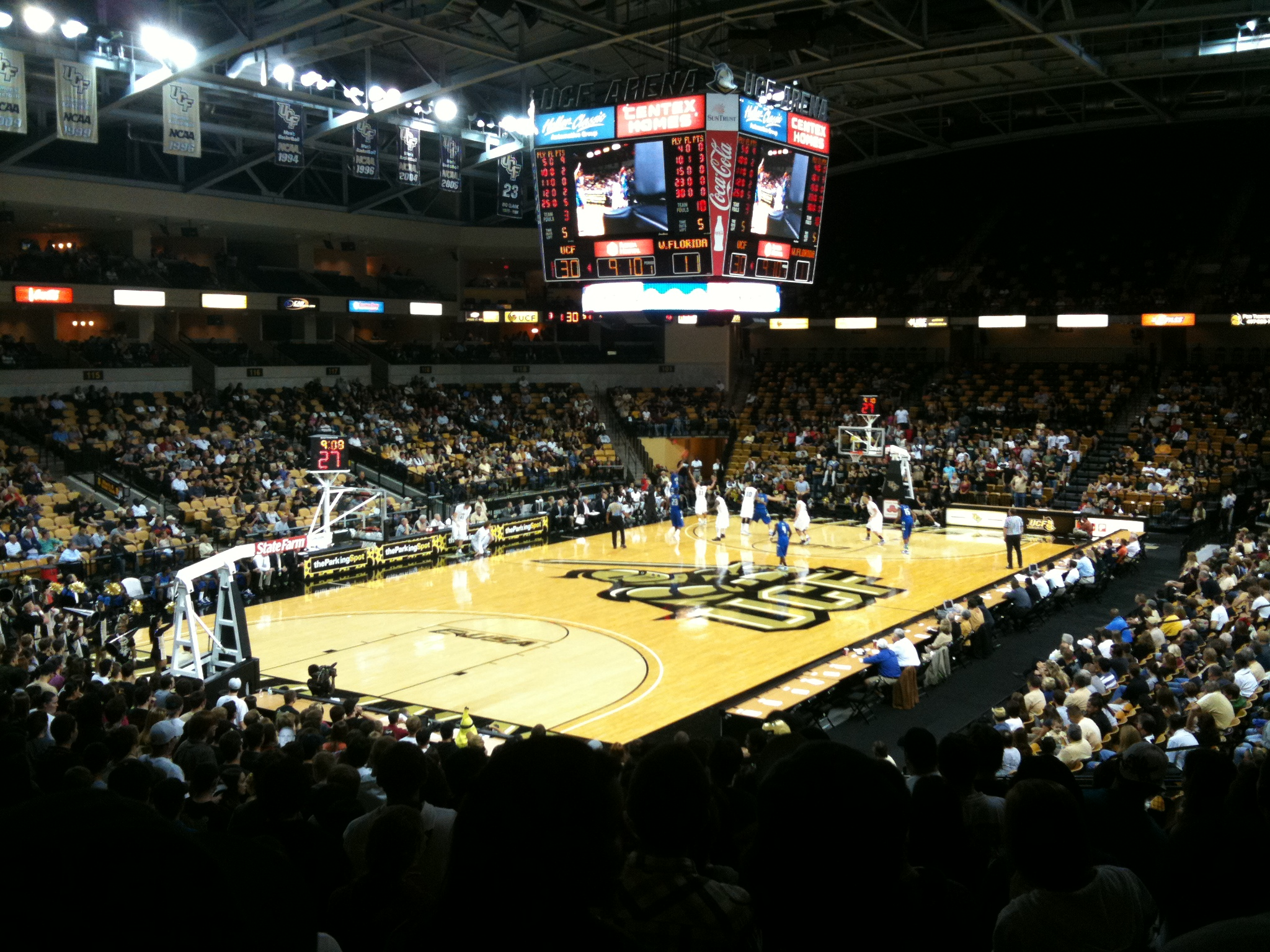
Interior of the CFE Arena

When the basketball program moved into the New UCF Arena in the fall of 2007, the facility could hold more students than ever before. To go along with its new facility and its new commitment to basketball, a new student section known as the "Knightmare" was formed. The "Knightmare" debuted on January 11, 2008, during a men's basketball game. Adorned in their black Knightmare shirts, the students completely filled the bleachered section behind the basket and the overflow section in the upper deck.

One of UCF's most unusual basketball traditions is its free throw chant. Started by students in the 1990s, UCF fans started by holding their right arms with clenched fists almost straight up when a UCF player shoots a free throw. When the throw is made, the fans would stomp their right foot twice, clap their hands twice, make a shooting motion with their right hand while chanting "woosh." In recent years, after the "Stomp Stomp, Clap Clap, Woosh" chant, fans chant U-C-F afterwards, making a "U", a "C", and an "F" shape over their heads. During the 2010–2011 season, a group of students started a new tradition; if a UCF player makes all of his/her free throws, the chant is followed by "ballin".

In another tradition, if the opponent goes for a shot and gets an "air ball," students chant the entire game for that one player.

== Team record ==
Record table
Season	Coach	Overall	Conference	Standing	Postseason
FTU (AIAW Division II Independent) (1977–1978)
1977–78	Judy Martino	10–11			
UCF (AIAW Division II Independent) (1978–1981)
1978–79	Nancy Sirmons	17–5			
1979–80	Nancy Sirmons	23–9			AIAW D–II Florida State Champion
1980–81	Sharon Adamson	13–10			
UCF (AIAW D–I Sunshine State Conference) (1981–1982)
1981–82	Joe Sanchez	24–15	10–2	1st	AIAW Elite 8
UCF (NCAA D–II Sunshine State Conference) (1982–1984)
1982–83	Joe Sanchez	25–5	12–0	1st	NCAA D–II first round
1983–84	Joe Sanchez	23–7	11–1	1st	NCAA D–II first round
UCF (NCAA Division I Independent) (1984–1985)
1984–85	Joe Sanchez	20–10			
UCF (New South Women's Athletic Conference) (1985–1990)
1985–86	Nancy Little	13–15	5–7		
1986–87	Nancy Little	3–23	1–11		
1987–88	Beverly Knight	4–23	1–11		
1988–89	Beverly Knight	11–17	2–10		
1989–90	Beverly Knight	7–20	3–9		
UCF (American South Conference) (1990–1991)
1990–91	Beverly Knight	10–15	4–9		
UCF (Sun Belt Conference) (1991–1992)
1991–92	Gail Falkenberg	10–18	5–11		
Jerry Richardson (Trans-American Athletic Conference/Atlantic Sun Conference) (1992–1996)
1992–93	Jerry Richardson	4–24	3–9	7th	
1993–94	Jerry Richardson	12–15	8–4	3rd	
1994–95	Jerry Richardson	11–16	7–9	6th	
1995–96	Jerry Richardson	15–14	7–8	6th	NCAA first round
Jerry Richardson:		42–69			
Lynn Bria (Trans-American Athletic Conference/Atlantic Sun Conference) (1996–1999)
1996–97	Lynn Bria	13–15	9–7	4th	
1997–98	Lynn Bria	17–11	11–5	2nd	
1998–99	Lynn Bria	20–10	13–3	1st	NCAA first round
Lynn Bria:		50–36	33–15		
Gail Striegler (Trans-American Athletic Conference/Atlantic Sun Conference) (1999–2005)
1999–2000	Gail Striegler	9–20	5–13	9th	
2000–01	Gail Striegler	10–18	8–10	6th	
2001–02	Gail Striegler	17–13	13–7	3rd	
2002–03	Gail Striegler	19–11	13–3	1st	
2003–04	Gail Striegler	17–13	14–6	4th	
2004–05	Gail Striegler	19–10	16–4	1st	
Gail Striegler (Conference USA) (2005–2007)
2005–06	Gail Striegler	7–21	5–11	11th	
2006–07	Gail Striegler	8–22	3–13	11th	
Gail Striegler:		106–128			
Joi Williams (Conference USA) (2007–2016)
2007–08	Joi Williams	10–20	3–13	12th	
2008–09	Joi Williams	17–17	11–5	5th	NCAA first round
2009–10	Joi Williams	11–16	7–9	8th	
2010–11	Joi Williams	22–11	12–4	2nd	NCAA first round
2011–12	Joi Williams	12–17	7–9	8th	
2012–13	Joi Williams	16–18	7–9	8th	
American Athletic Conference
2013–14	Joi Williams	10–20	3–15	9th	
2014–15	Joi Williams	9–21	5–13	8th	
2015–16	Joi Williams	7–23	4–14	10th	
Joi Williams:		114–163			
Katie Abrahamson-Henderson (American Athletic Conference) (2016–2022)
2016–17	Katie Abrahamson-Henderson	21–12	9–7	4th	WNIT second round
2017–18	Katie Abrahamson-Henderson	22–11	12–4	3rd	WNIT second round
2018–19	Katie Abrahamson-Henderson	26–6	13–3	2nd	NCAA first round
2019–20	Katie Abrahamson-Henderson	20–10	11–5	3rd	NCAA Tournament canceled
2020–21	Katie Abrahamson-Henderson	16–5	12–2	2nd	NCAA first round
2021–22	Katie Abrahamson-Henderson	26–4	14–1	1st	NCAA second round
Katie Abrahamson-Henderson:		131–49	68–26		
Sytia Messer (American Athletic Conference) (2022–2026)
2022–23	Sytia Messer	14–15	4–11	10th	
Big 12 Conference
2023–24	Sytia Messer	12–17	3–15	14th	
2024–25	Sytia Messer	12–18	4–14	13th	
2025–26	Sytia Messer	11–19	3–15	14th	
Sytia Messer:		49–69	14–55		
Gabe Lazo (Big Twelve Conference) (2026–present)
2026–27	Gabe Lazo	0–0	0–0		
Gabe Lazo:		0–0	0–0		
Total:		704–716 (.496)			
National champion Postseason invitational champion Conference regular season champion Conference regular season and conference tournament champion Division regular season champion Division regular season and conference tournament champion Conference tournament champion

== Notable players ==
- Emma Cannon (born 1989), basketball player for the Los Angeles Sparks of the WNBA
- Masseny Kaba, (born 1998), basketball player for the Guinea women's national basketball team
- Tari Phillips (born 1969), former WNBA player

== See also ==
- UCF Knights men's basketball
