= Lady Chieftains =

New Mexico girls basketball team

The Lady Chieftains are a girls basketball team from Shiprock, New Mexico, located on the Navajo Nation. They are the subject of the documentary Rocks with Wings. The documentary charts the transformation of the team from a lackluster team to a championship team led by coach Jerry Richardson.

== History of Lady Chieftains ==
Before the hiring of Jerry Richardson, the Lady Chieftains were a losing basketball team at Shiprock High School. Interest was low in the girls basketball program and rival school Kirtland Central High School had been the state champions for 8 consecutive years. Richardson set out to change this attitude among the Navajo community of Shiprock. To quote him "I had never been associated with anything that lost. We had to change some attitudes.".

The year was 1987 and the Lady Chieftains did well enough to reach the state championships versus Kirtland Central. After a close game, the Lady Chieftains lost during overtime. The next year however, the Lady Chieftains came back to the state championships and in another close game, were able to defeat their rivals to become the new state champions

The Lady Chieftains, according to the director of Rocks with Wings essentially become one of the first events that help unite the Navajo community of Shiprock.

== Jerry Richardson ==
Jerry Richardson was a high school basketball star from Texas. Due to racism and a bad relationship with his high school coach and athletic director, Jerry's scholarship offers were withheld and Jerry was prevented from being recruited by college athletic scouts. Richardson finally received a track scholarship from Northwestern University and went on to receive a Master's degree in Education from Louisiana Tech. Unable to find a teaching job, Richardson was finally hired by Shiprock to teach English and he eventually began coaching boys' football, and later the girls' basketball team in 1982. In five years, he successfully led the Lady Chieftains to the state championships. Richardson would lead the team to 4 New Mexico state championships between 1982 and 1992. Richardson died after being struck in an auto accident in 1996, he was teaching at the University of Central Florida at the time.
