= Jerry Richardson (disambiguation) =

Jerry Richardson (1936–2023) was an American businessman, football player and owner of the Carolina Panthers of the National Football League.

Jerry Richardson may also refer to:

- Jerry Richardson (defensive back) (born 1941), American football defensive back
- Jerry Richardson (basketball), US basketball player and coach
- Jerry Richardson (South Africa), anti-apartheid activist and convicted murderer.

== See also ==
- Gerry Richardson (1932–1971), British police superintendent
- Jerome Richardson (disambiguation)
