= Gabe Lazo =

American basketball coach (born 1984)

Current position
- Title: Head coach
- Team: UCF
- Conference: Big 12
- Record: 0–0 (–)

Biographical details
- Born: December 17, 1984 (age 41); Miami, Florida, U.S.

Playing career
- 2004–2006: FIU
- 2006–2008: Barry University

Coaching career (HC unless noted)
- 2017–2019: FIU (assistant)
- 2019–2021: Stony Brook (assistant)
- 2021–2022: George Washington (assistant)
- 2022–2024: Mississippi State (assistant)
- 2024–2026: Tennessee (assistant)
- 2026–present: UCF

Head coaching record
- Overall: 0–0 (–)

Gabriel Lazo (born December 17, 1984) is an American college basketball coach for UCF.

== Coaching career ==
Lazo began his coaching career as an assistant coach at FIU. He then served as an assistant coach at Stony Brook for two years. During the 2019–20 season, in his first season with the team, he helped lead the Seawolves to a 28–3 record, and the America East regular-season championship, and conference tournament championships for the first time in program history.

On April 28, 2021, he was named an assistant coach for George Washington during the 2021–22 season. On March 25, 2022, he was named an assistant coach and defensive coordinator for Mississippi State. During the 2022–23 season, he helped lead the Bulldogs to a 22–11 record and the second round of the 2023 NCAA tournament. During the 2023–24 season, he helped lead the Bulldogs to a 23–12 record and the quarterfinals of the 2024 Women's Basketball Invitation Tournament.

On April 16, 2024, he was named an assistant coach for Tennessee. During the 2024–25 season, he helped lead the Lady Volunteers to a 24–10 record and the Sweet Sixteen of the 2025 NCAA tournament. He was the primary recruiter for the nation's top-ranked high school class of 2025.

On March 31. 2026, he was named an assistant coach for LSU. However, on April 4, 2026, he left LSU and accepted the head coaching job for UCF, replacing Sytia Messer.
