= Newcomb High School =

Coordinates: 36°16′36″N 108°42′43″W

Location
- Hwy 491, Mile Marker 56/57; Newcomb, New Mexico 87455; United States

Information
- Type: Public High School
- Teaching staff: 17.10 (FTE)
- Grades: 9-12
- Enrollment: 230 (2023–2024)
- Student to teacher ratio: 13.45
- Colors: Green, Gold
- Athletics: District 1-AA
- Mascot: Skyhawk
- Website: nhs.centralschools.org

Newcomb High School is a public high school in Newcomb, New Mexico, United States. Newcomb High is a part of the Central Consolidated School District along with Kirtland Central High School and Shiprock High School. The school colors are kelly green and gold and the mascot is the Skyhawk.

== Athletics and activities ==
Newcomb High School participates in NMAA's District 1-AAA.

In 2019, the Newcomb boys basketball made history by appearing in their first state championship game. They would eventually take state runner-up and finished their season with an impressive record at 29–3.

State Championships

Sport	Class	Year
Cross Country, Girls	A-AA	1988
Cross Country, Girls	A-AA	1989
Cross Country, Girls	A-AA	1990
Cross Country, Girls	A-AA	1995
