= Orville Tsinnie =

Navajo jeweler and silversmith from Arizona (1943–2017)

- Born: 1943; Tuba City, Arizona
- Died: May 23, 2017 (aged 73–74); Shiprock, New Mexico
- Citizenship: Navajo Nation and American
- Known for: silversmithing, jewelry making, katsina carving
- Spouse: Darlene Tsinnie
- Mother: Ann Yellowhorse

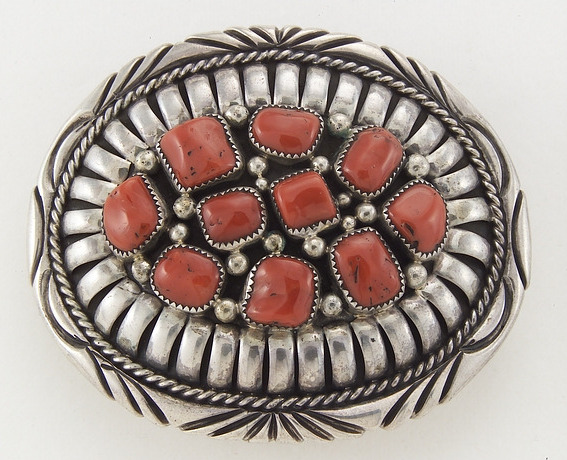
Orville Z. Tsinnie, Belt buckle, hammered silver with 10 coral nuggets, Collection of the National Museum of the American Indian, Smithsonian Institution

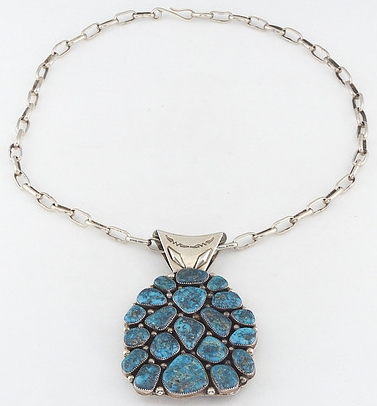
Orville Tsinnie, Necklace with turquoise and silver pendant, c.1980. Collection of the National Museum of the American Indian, of the Smithsonian Institution

Orville Z. Tsinnie (1943–May 23, 2017) was a Diné silversmith, jewelry maker and katsina carver from the Navajo Nation. He lived and worked in Shiprock (Navajo: Tse bit'a'i), New Mexico for most of his life.

== Career ==
Tsinnie began making jewelry in 1973, learning from his Hopi brother-in-law, Horace Emerson. His career sustained for nearly 50 years. He worked in both traditional as well as innovative designs in heavy gauge silver. In addition to working with turquoise and lapis, he also worked with fossilized dinosaur bone and coral. He and his wife often shared the same hallmark stamps. He regularly exhibited his work at the annual Santa Fe Indian Market. He also used a hallmark that was an image of the Shiprock rock formation.

He was known for his precise and innovative jewelry designs and also for his carved katsina dolls. Tsinnie's work was featured in an exhibition at the Whitney Museum of American Art in the indoor sculpture garden at the Philip Morris public atrium in New York City, and at the Heard Museum.

=== Honors and collections ===
Tsinnie was awarded with the Lifetime Achievement Award from the Indian Arts and Crafts Association in 1999; and had also been named by the IACA as "Artist of the Year." In 1986 he won first place in the 37th Navajo Craftsman Exhibition that was held at the Museum of Northern Arizona.

Several pieces of his work are held in the permanent collection of the National Museum of the American Indian of the Smithsonian Institution.

=== Advocacy ===
During his lifetime he advocated for the rights of his people, particularly focusing on the needs of the Navajo people, public health, education, employment and the Bureau of Indian Affairs. Tsinnie also worked for many years for the Navajo Nation as an administrator.

== Personal life ==
Tsinnie was born in Tuba City, (Navajo: Tó Naneesdizí) Arizona to Ann Yellowhorse, who was also a jeweler.

His wife Darlene was also a well known jeweler. They shared a studio was located near Shiprock, New Mexico and also owned a gallery there.

In addition to his work as a jewelry maker, Tsinnie was employed by the Navajo Police Department as an officer and also worked for the Navajo Nation in the personnel department.

He died in Shiprock, New Mexico on May 23, 2017, at the age of 73.
