= Jerome Richardson (disambiguation) =

Jerome Richardson (1920–2000) was an American jazz musician.

Jerome Richardson may also refer to:

- Jerome "Pooh" Richardson (born 1966), American basketball player
- Jerry Richardson (1936–2023), American businessman, football player and owner

== See also ==
- Jerry Richardson (disambiguation)
