= San Juan River Bridge at Shiprock =

- U.S. National Register of Historic Places
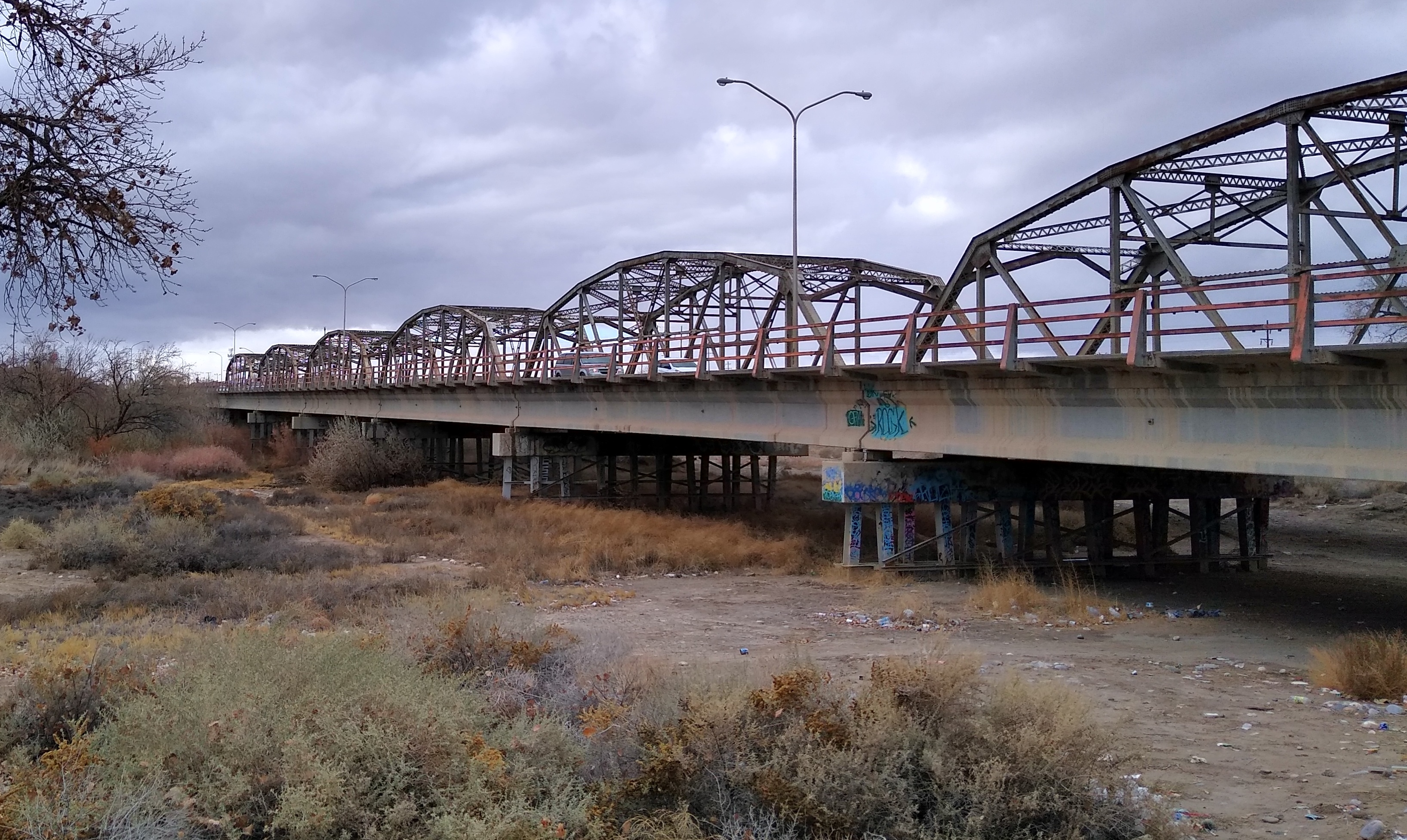

- Location within New Mexico
- Location: US 666 over San Juan R., Shiprock, New Mexico
- Coordinates: 36.781277°N 108.692046°W
- Area: less than one acre
- Built: 1937
- Architectural style: Parker through truss
- MPS: Historic Highway Bridges of New Mexico MPS
- NRHP reference No.: 97000740
- Added to NRHP: July 15, 1997

The San Juan River Bridge at Shiprock, in Shiprock, New Mexico, is a Parker through truss bridge built in 1937. It was listed on the National Register of Historic Places in 1997.

It is a six-span Parker through truss steel bridge fabricated by W.E. Bondurant. It brought U.S. Highway 64 and U.S. Route 666 (now called US Route 491]) over a broad floodplain of the San Juan River.

From the late 1950s on, when a parallel steel beam bridge was built adjacent to it, it has carried westbound and southbound traffic.

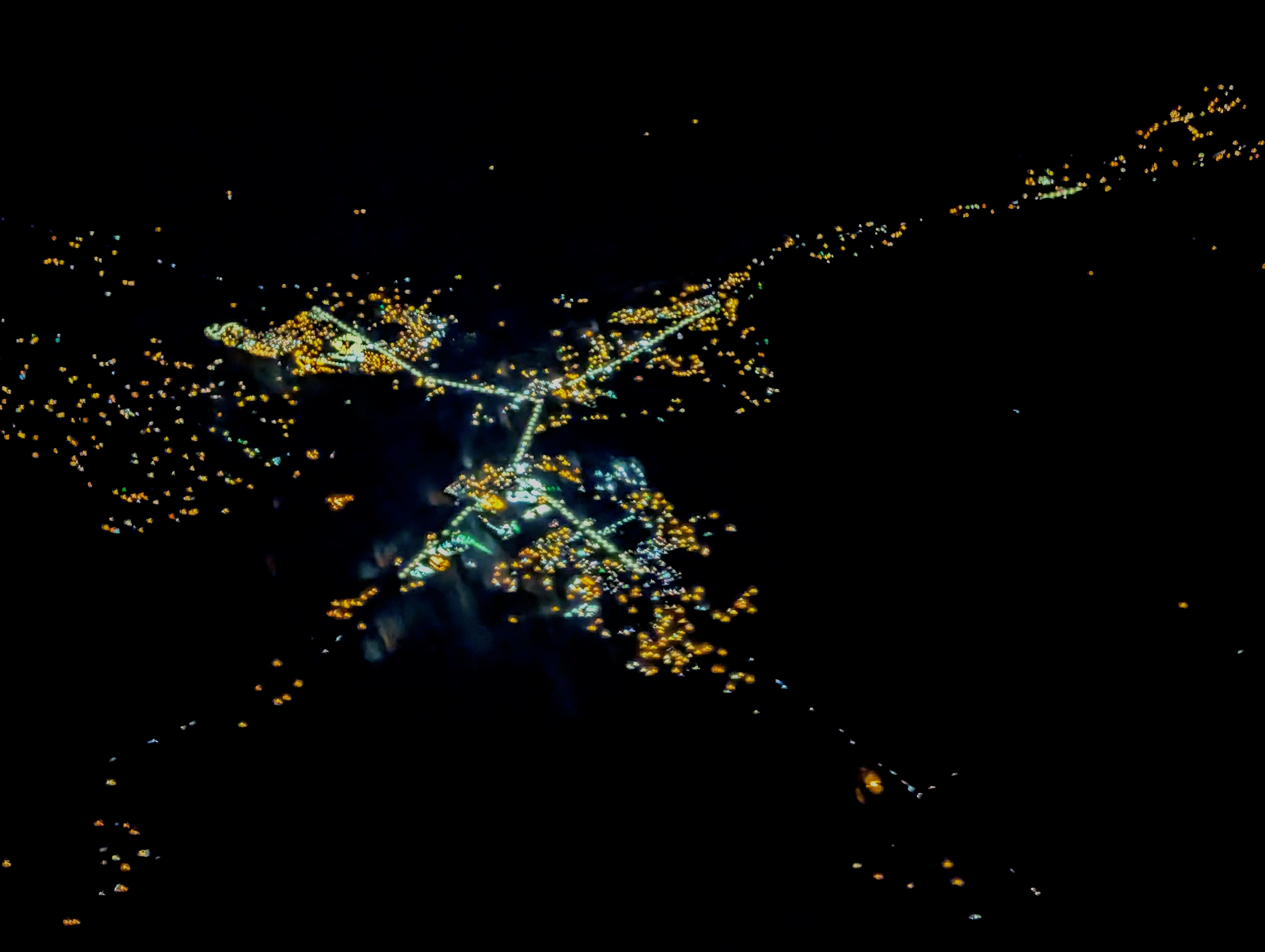
Night aerial view from the southwest of Shiprock, New Mexico, where US Route 64 and US Route 491 cross each other and cross the San Juan River Bridge together, 64 westbound and 491 southbound, while the newer parallel bridge carries the other direction
