= Kirtland Central High School =

Public high school in Kirtland, New Mexico

Coordinates: 36°44′15″N 108°22′16″W

Location
- 550 Road 6100; Kirtland, New Mexico 87417; United States

Information
- School type: Public, High School
- Motto: Igniting knowledge as the gateway to a successful future.
- Principal: Sandra Westbrook
- Staff: 48.70 (FTE)
- Enrollment: 704 (2023–2024)
- Average class size: 19
- Student to teacher ratio: 14.46
- Campus: Suburban
- Colors: Purple & Vegas Gold
- Athletics: 17 sports
- Athletics conference: NMAA; AAAA District 1
- Team name: Broncos
- Website: kch.centralschools.org

Kirtland Central High School (KCHS) is located in the town of Kirtland, New Mexico, United States. Its colors are purple and gold and their mascot is the Bronco. KCHS is a part of the Central Consolidated School District along with Newcomb High School and Shiprock High School.

== Athletics ==
Kirtland Central is a New Mexico Activities Association (NMAA) AAAA school in District 1-4A. KCHS competes in 15 NMAA sport and Activity Events. KCHS has taken a total of 32 State Championships in 3A & 4A.

State Champions	Year:	Total
Girls' Basketball	1980, 1981, 1982, 1983, 1984, 1985, 1986, 1987, 1993, 1994, 1995, 1996, 1999, 2001, 2003, 2004, 2005, 2010, 2012, 2022, 2024, 2026	22
Boys' Basketball	1978, 2001, 2002, 2003	4
Football	1963, 1964, 1969, 1973	4
Girls' Golf	2000	1
Girls' Cross Country	1999	1
Girls' Volleyball	1988	1
Boys' Track & Field	2001	1

=== Girls' Basketball ===
The girls basketball program at Kirtland Central High School has established one of the most remarkable dynasties in New Mexico high school sports history. Since 1979, the Lady Broncos have appeared in 37 state championship games, capturing 22 state titles while finishing as runners-up 15 times. Nationally, the program is tied for 5th place for the most state championships in the United States according to the National Federation of State High School Associations.

The program has produced numerous standout players and All-Americans who continued their careers at the collegiate level, including Colette Hatch (New Mexico State University), Cara Priddy (University of Texas at Austin), Karina Zapata (Brigham Young University), and Karyn Karlin (University of Arkansas). Other notable contributors include Nadia Begay (Boise State University), Jaimey Tanner (Montana State University), and Sharon Max (Eastern New Mexico University).

Kirtland Central’s rise began with a state championship appearance in 1979, where they fell to St. Pius X High School. The Lady Broncos quickly rebounded, winning eight consecutive state titles from 1980 through 1987—one of the most dominant stretches in state history.

A defining chapter of the program has been its rivalry with Shiprock High School. The two schools have met nine times in the state championship game, with Kirtland Central winning five matchups (1987, 1993, 1994, 1995, 2010) and Shiprock winning four (1988, 1989, 1990, 1992). The Lady Broncos also captured four consecutive titles from 1993 to 1996 and later achieved another championship run with a three-peat from 2003 to 2005.

The program has recorded several undefeated seasons, finishing 27–0 in 1981, 26–0 in 1984, 27–0 in 1986, and 27–0 in 1996. In addition to its championships, Kirtland Central has finished as state runner-up in 1979, 1988, 1989, 1990, 1992, 1998, 2000, 2002, 2007, 2008, 2011, 2019, 2020, 2023, and 2025.

Most recently, the Lady Broncos added to their legacy by winning the 2026 state championship, defeating Gallup High School.

==== Championship Games ====
- 1979...St. Pius X 51 Kirtland Central 44 (3A State Championship)
- 1980...Kirtland Central 52 Los Lunas 46 (3A State Championship)
- 1981...Kirtland Central 50 Portales 36 (3A State Championship)
- 1982...Kirtland Central 66 Tohatchi 35 (3A State Championship)
- 1983...Kirtland Central 56 Bernalillo 54 (3A State Championship)
- 1984...Kirtland Central 65 Bloomfield 28 (3A State Championship)
- 1985...Kirtland Central 44 St. Pius X 30 (3A State Championship)
- 1986...Kirtland Central 52 St. Pius X 43 (3A State Championship)
- 1987...Kirtland Central 62 Shiprock 61 (3A State Championship)
- 1988...Shiprock High School 60 Kirtland Central 58 (3A State Championship)
- 1989...Shiprock 83 Kirtland Central 55 (3A State Championship)
- 1990...Shiprock 57 Kirtland Central 36 (3A State Championship)
- 1992...Shiprock 58 Kirtland Central 54 (3A State Championship)
- 1993...Kirtland Central 47 Shiprock 46 (3A State Championship)
- 1994...Kirtland Central 57 Shiprock 54 (3A State Championship)
- 1995...Kirtland Central 68 Shiprock 49 (3A State Championship)
- 1996...Kirtland Central 61 Pojoaque Valley 55 (3A State Championship)
- 1998...Pojoaque Valley 67 Kirtland Central 65 (3A State Championship)
- 1999...Kirtland Central 46 Artesia High School 33 (3A State Championship)
- 2000...Silver High School 60 Kirtland Central 57 (3A State Championship)
- 2001...Kirtland Central 66 Farmington High School 55 (4A State Championship)
- 2002...Farmington 71 Kirtland Central 63 (4A State Championship)
- 2003...Kirtland Central 89 Moriarty 59 (4A State Championship)
- 2004...Kirtland Central 42 Farmington 35 (4A State Championship)
- 2005...Kirtland Central 65 Deming 50 (4A State Championship)
- 2007...Aztec 52 Kirtland Central 46 (4A State Championship)
- 2008...St. Pius X 57 Kirtland Central 48 (4A State Championship)
- 2010...Kirtland Central 71 Shiprock 52 (4A State Championship)
- 2011...Gallup High School 60 Kirtland Central 46 (4A State Championship)
- 2012...Kirtland Central 42 Roswell High School 41 (4A State Championship)
- 2019...Los Lunas 49 Kirtland Central 43 (4A State Championship)
- 2020...Los Lunas 47 Kirtland Central 33 (4A State Championship)
- 2022...Kirtland Central 55 Bernalillo 32 (4A State Championship)
- 2023...Gallup 57 Kirtland Central 47 (4A State Championship)
- 2024...Kirtland Central 45 St. Pius X 33 (4A State Championship)
- 2025...Gallup 51 Kirtland Central 41 (4A State Championship)
- 2026...Kirtland Central 52 Gallup 33 (4A State Championship)
