= Sytia Messer =

American basketball coach

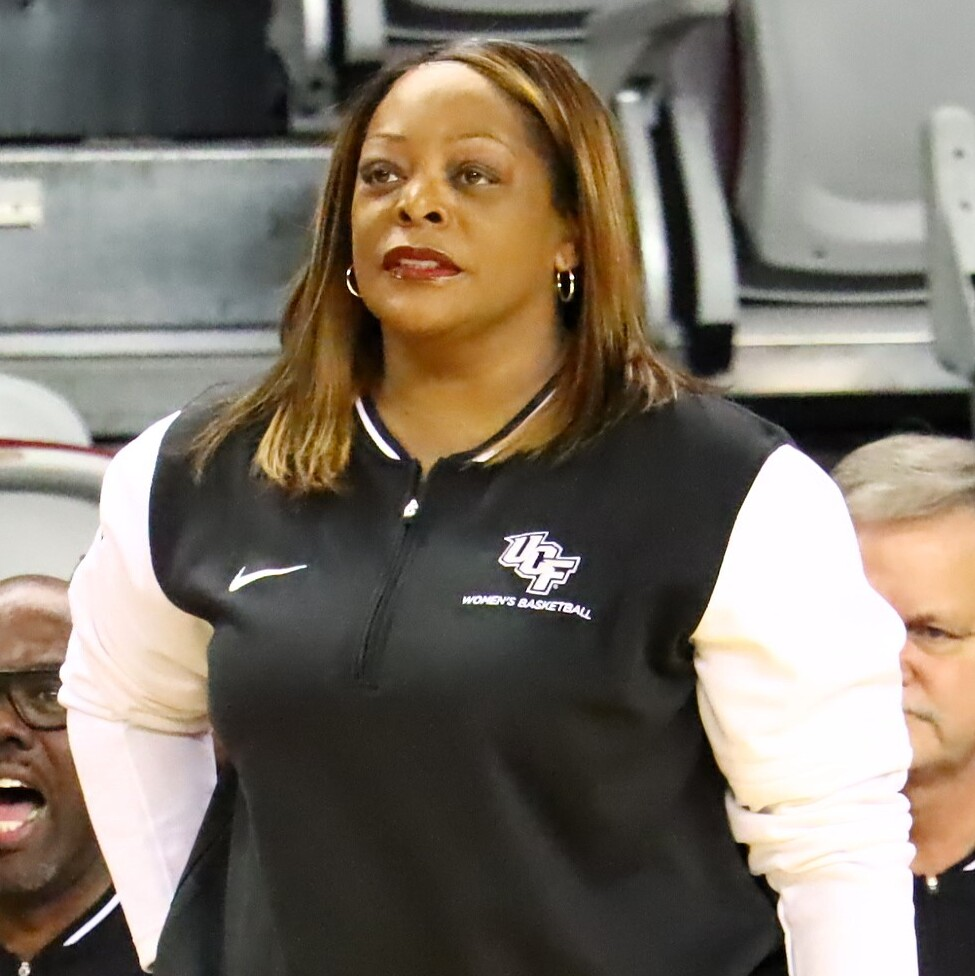
- Messer with UCF in 2024

Biographical details
- Born: 1976 or 1977 (age 48–49); Waldo, Arkansas, U.S.

Playing career
- 1995–1999: Arkansas

Coaching career (HC unless noted)
- 1999–2001: Arkansas State (assistant)
- 2001–2004: Memphis (assistant)
- 2004–2009: Georgia Tech (assistant)
- 2009–2012: Tennessee Tech
- 2012–2013: Georgia Tech (associate HC)
- 2014–2021: Baylor (assistant)
- 2021–2022: LSU (associate HC)
- 2022–2026: UCF

Head coaching record
- Overall: 103–110 (.484)

Accomplishments and honors

Championships
- OVC regular season (2011)

Awards
- SEC All-Freshman Team (1996)

Sytia Messer is an American women's college basketball coach.

== Career ==
She was the head coach of the UCF Knights women's basketball program from 2022 to 2026. She was the head women's basketball coach at Tennessee Technological University from 2009 to 2012, compiling a record of 54–41. From 2012 to 2014, she was associate head coach at the Georgia Institute of Technology.

== Head coaching record ==
Record table
Season	Team	Overall	Conference	Standing	Postseason
Tennessee Tech Golden Eagles (Ohio Valley Conference) (2009–2012)
2009–10	Tennessee Tech	14–16	8–10	T–4th	
2010–11	Tennessee Tech	23–8	15–3	1st	WNIT First Round
2011–12	Tennessee Tech	17–17	11–5	4th	WBI First Round
Tennessee Tech:		54–41	34–18		
UCF Knights (American Athletic Conference) (2022–2023)
2022–23	UCF	14–15	4–11	10th	
UCF Knights (Big 12 Conference) (2023–2026)
2023–24	UCF	12–17	3–15	14th	
2024–25	UCF	12–18	4–14	T–12th	
2025–26	UCF	11–19	3–15	T–14th	
UCF:		49–69 (.415)	14–55 (.203)		
Total:		103–110 (.484)			
National champion Postseason invitational champion Conference regular season champion Conference regular season and conference tournament champion Division regular season champion Division regular season and conference tournament champion Conference tournament champion
