= Shiprock, New Mexico =

Town in New Mexico, United States

Shiprock, New Mexico Naatʼáanii Nééz (Navajo)
- Unincorporated community Census-designated place
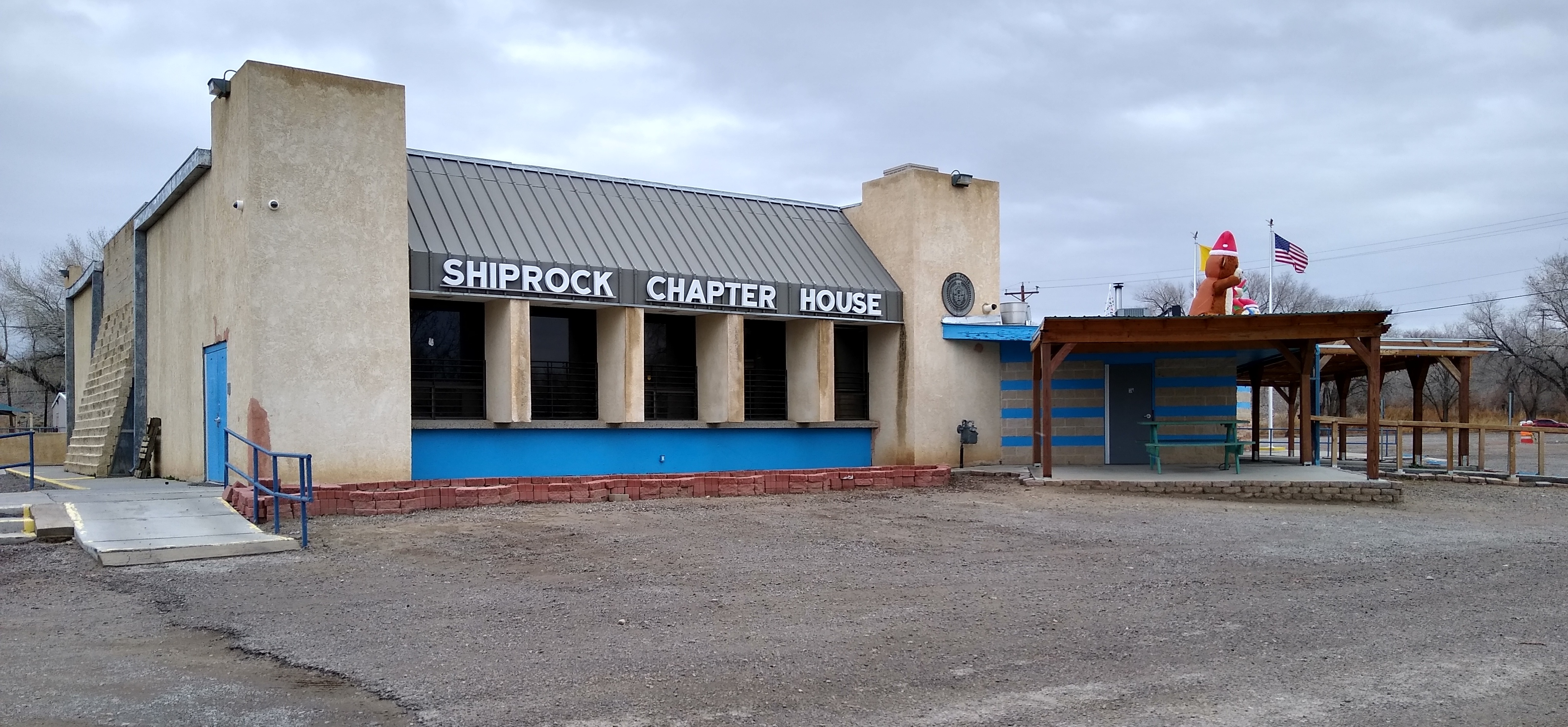
- Shiprock Chapter House

- Location of Shiprock, New Mexico

- Location in the United States
- Coordinates: 36°47′33″N 108°42′02″W
- Country: United States
- State: New Mexico
- County: San Juan

Area
  - Total: 13.71 sq mi (35.50 km^{2})
  - Land: 13.51 sq mi (34.99 km^{2})
  - Water: 0.19 sq mi (0.50 km^{2})
- Elevation: 4,954 ft (1,510 m)

Population (2020)
  - Total: 7,718
  - Density: 571.2/sq mi (220.56/km^{2})
- Time zone: UTC-7 (Mountain (MST))
  - Summer (DST): UTC-6 (MDT)
- ZIP codes: 87420, 87461
- Area code: 505
- FIPS code: 35–72770
- GNIS feature ID: 2408729

Shiprock (Navajo: Naatʼáanii Nééz) is an unincorporated community on the Navajo reservation in San Juan County, New Mexico, United States. The population was 7,718 people in the 2020 census. For statistical purposes, the United States Census Bureau has defined Shiprock as a census-designated place (CDP). It is part of the Farmington Metropolitan Statistical Area.

Shiprock is named after the nearby Shiprock rock formation. Since 1903, the town has been called Naat’áanii Nééz (meaning “tall leader” in the Navajo language) after the San Juan Indian Agency superintendent William T. Shelton who settled Shiprock for the United States government.

Diné College is a local four-year college (formerly Navajo Community College), a tribally controlled community college with seven other campuses across the Navajo Nation. It is the site of a Chapter House for the Navajo, a Bureau of Indian Affairs agency and the Northern Navajo Medical Center (an Indian Health Service hospital).

The town is a key road junction for truck traffic and tourists visiting the Four Corners, Mesa Verde, Shiprock and the Grand Canyon. It lies at the intersection of U.S. Route 64 and U.S. Route 491 (formerly U.S. Route 666). The annual Northern Navajo Fair is held every October. Since 1984, the community has hosted the Shiprock Marathon and Relay.

== History ==
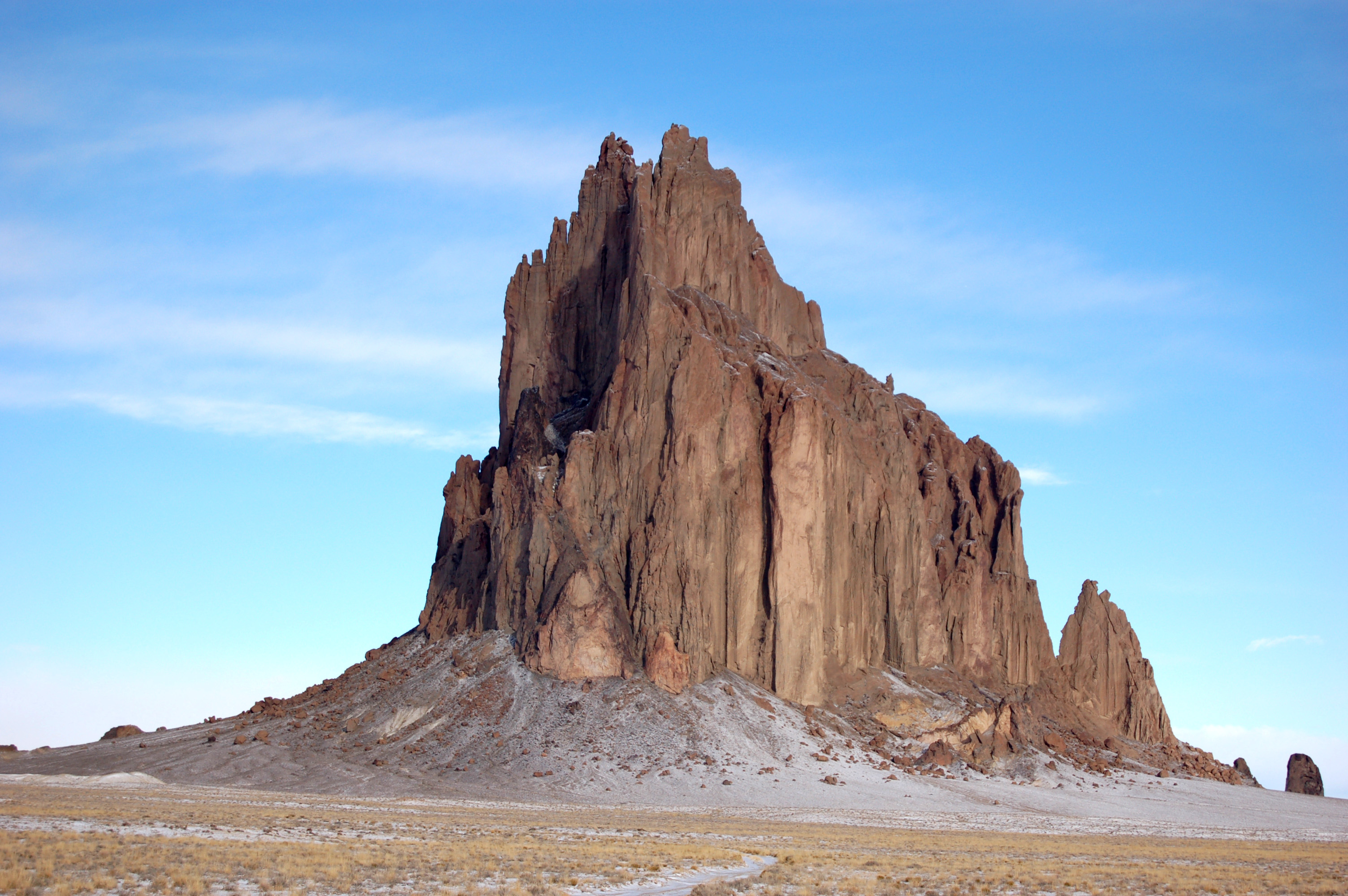
The nearby rock formation that gives Shiprock its name

Shiprock was founded on September 11, 1903, by San Juan Agency superintendent William Taylor Shelton after being assigned to the northern Navajo by the Bureau of Indian Affairs. A former U.S. government instructor in agriculture at the Cherokee School in Yellow Hill, North Carolina (now Cherokee, NC), Shelton had moved up through BIA ranks to be given the appointment to open an Indian agency and boarding school. He founded Shiprock Indian School and administrative agency with a staff of three white and three Navajo employees. Shiprock Indian Boarding School remained until the American Indian boarding school system was phased out in the early 1980s.

The settlement encompassed land originally belonging to Tséheya Begay. According to one of Shelton's early reports, Navajo had been irrigating the land for many years, with 275 farms drawing water from approximately 25 ditches between the Shiprock area and Farmington. Under Shelton, the agency expanded the irrigation system and developed a dairy herd as part of its agricultural program; a sawmill near Sanostee and coal mine in the Hogback area were also developed. Early buildings in Shiprock were constructed of log and adobe, but brick replaced these materials after the disastrous flood of 1912. The superintendent was known as a disciplinarian who was ruthless in his prosecution of “moral lapses,” but is said to have been generally respected throughout the region, particularly for his efforts in adding the Utah-Colorado extension to the main Navajo Reservation.

Navajo Corrections operated the Shiprock District Department of Corrections jail facility in Shiprock. It had a capacity of twelve and, after being cited for mold complaints, closed in 2021.

== Geography ==
According to the United States Census Bureau, the CDP has a total area of 16.2 square miles (42 km^{2}), of which 15.9 square miles (41 km^{2}) is land and 0.3 square miles (0.78 km^{2}) (2.10%) is water.

=== Climate ===
Climate data for Shiprock, New Mexico
| Month | Jan | Feb | Mar | Apr | May | Jun | Jul | Aug | Sep | Oct | Nov | Dec | Year |
|---|---|---|---|---|---|---|---|---|---|---|---|---|---|
| Mean daily maximum °F (°C) | 46.4 (8.0) | 53.1 (11.7) | 63.8 (17.7) | 71.8 (22.1) | 82.4 (28.0) | 91.8 (33.2) | 96.4 (35.8) | 92.9 (33.8) | 85.6 (29.8) | 72.6 (22.6) | 58.2 (14.6) | 46.3 (7.9) | 71.8 (22.1) |
| Daily mean °F (°C) | 32.8 (0.4) | 38.7 (3.7) | 46.6 (8.1) | 53.9 (12.2) | 64.2 (17.9) | 72.9 (22.7) | 79.0 (26.1) | 76.4 (24.7) | 68.1 (20.1) | 55.2 (12.9) | 42.9 (6.1) | 32.4 (0.2) | 55.3 (12.9) |
| Mean daily minimum °F (°C) | 19.1 (−7.2) | 24.4 (−4.2) | 29.4 (−1.4) | 36.0 (2.2) | 46.1 (7.8) | 54.0 (12.2) | 61.7 (16.5) | 59.8 (15.4) | 50.6 (10.3) | 37.9 (3.3) | 27.6 (−2.4) | 18.6 (−7.4) | 38.8 (3.8) |
| Average precipitation inches (mm) | 0.72 (18) | 0.73 (19) | 0.54 (14) | 0.43 (11) | 0.50 (13) | 0.22 (5.6) | 0.82 (21) | 1.24 (31) | 0.88 (22) | 0.76 (19) | 0.67 (17) | 0.70 (18) | 8.21 (208.6) |
| Average snowfall inches (cm) | 1.5 (3.8) | 0.6 (1.5) | 0.6 (1.5) | 0.0 (0.0) | 0.0 (0.0) | 0.0 (0.0) | 0.0 (0.0) | 0.0 (0.0) | 0.0 (0.0) | 0.0 (0.0) | 0.2 (0.51) | 1.0 (2.5) | 3.9 (9.81) |
Source: WRCC 1981-2010 normals, snow for 1926-2005

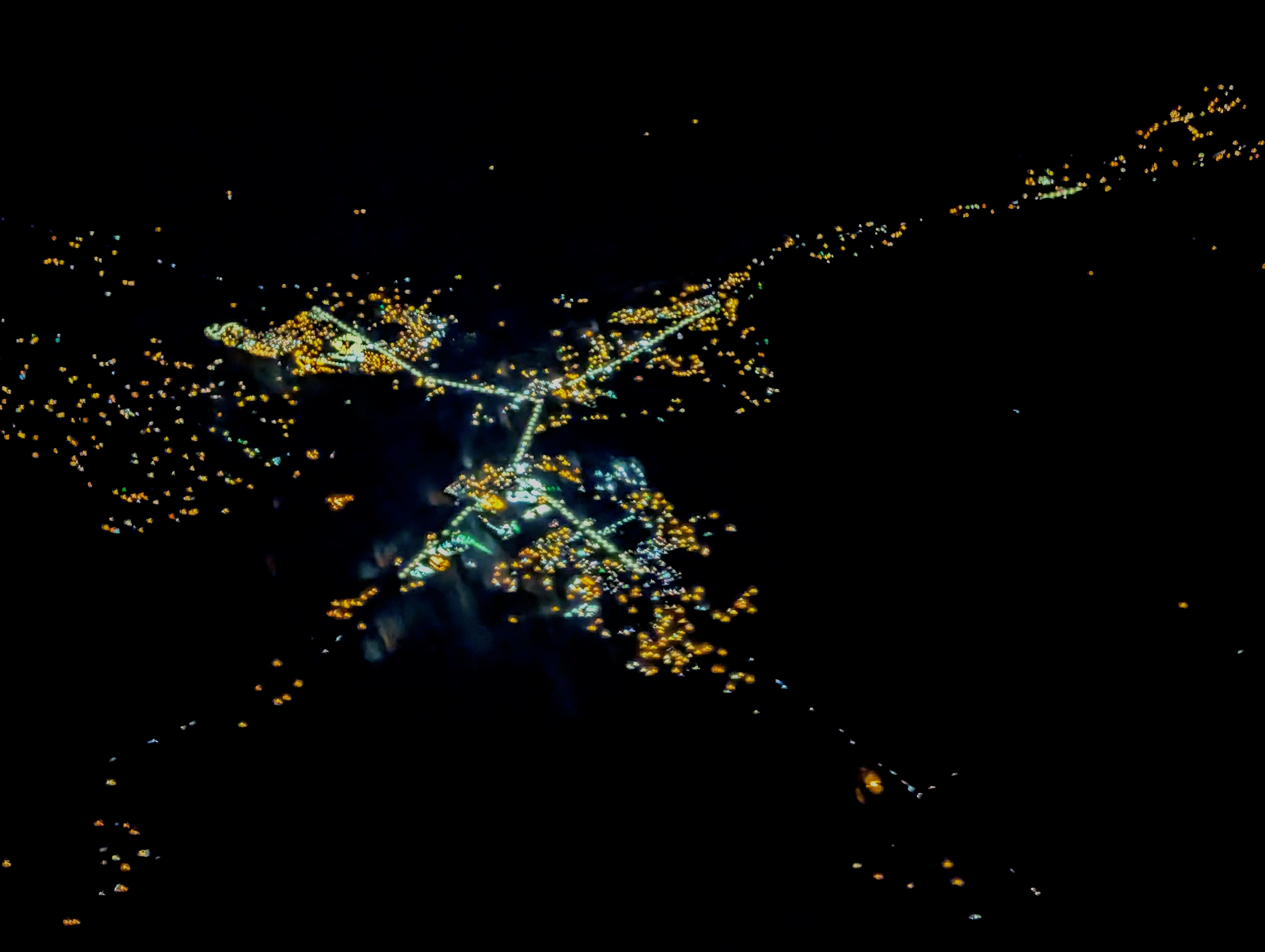
Night aerial view from the southwest of Shiprock, where US Route 64 and US Route 491 cross each other and cross the San Juan River Bridge at Shiprock together, 64 westbound and 491 southbound, while the newer parallel bridge carries the other direction

== Demographics ==
Historical population
| Census | Pop. | Note | %± |
|---|---|---|---|
| 2000 | 8,156 | | — |
| 2010 | 8,295 | | 1.7% |
| 2020 | 7,718 | | −7.0% |
U.S. Decennial Census

=== 2020 census ===
As of the 2020 census, Shiprock had a population of 7,718. The median age was 34.4 years. 28.5% of residents were under the age of 18 and 13.1% of residents were 65 years of age or older. For every 100 females there were 92.5 males, and for every 100 females age 18 and over there were 87.2 males age 18 and over.

79.7% of residents lived in urban areas, while 20.3% lived in rural areas.

There were 2,280 households in Shiprock, of which 45.1% had children under the age of 18 living in them. Of all households, 31.9% were married-couple households, 19.8% were households with a male householder and no spouse or partner present, and 39.9% were households with a female householder and no spouse or partner present. About 18.4% of all households were made up of individuals and 6.9% had someone living alone who was 65 years of age or older.

There were 2,438 housing units, of which 6.5% were vacant. The homeowner vacancy rate was 0.1% and the rental vacancy rate was 4.2%.

Racial composition as of the 2020 census
| Race | Number | Percent |
|---|---|---|
| White | 98 | 1.3% |
| Black or African American | 8 | 0.1% |
| American Indian and Alaska Native | 7,351 | 95.2% |
| Asian | 107 | 1.4% |
| Native Hawaiian and Other Pacific Islander | 8 | 0.1% |
| Some other race | 25 | 0.3% |
| Two or more races | 121 | 1.6% |
| Hispanic or Latino (of any race) | 139 | 1.8% |

=== 2010 census ===
In 2010, the population of Shiprock was 8,295, which is an increase of +1.7% since 2000.

=== 2000 census ===
As of the census of 2000, there were 8,156 people, 2,184 households, and 1,847 families residing in the CDP. The population density was 513.6 inhabitants per square mile (198.3/km^{2}). There were 2,594 housing units at an average density of 163.3 units per square mile (63.1 units/km^{2}). The racial makeup of the CDP was 96.74% Native American, 2.17% White, 0.16% African American, 0.12% Asian, 0.01% Pacific Islander, 0.10% from other races, and 0.70% from two or more races. Hispanic or Latino of any race were 1.29% of the population.

There were 2,184 households, out of which 52.2% had children under the age of 18 living with them, 48.0% were married couples living together, 28.7% had a female householder with no husband present, and 15.4% were non-families. 13.6% of all households were made up of individuals, and 3.7% had someone living alone who was 65 years of age or older. The average household size was 3.73 and the average family size was 4.06.

In the CDP, the population was spread out, with 38.6% under the age of 18, 11.6% from 18 to 24, 28.4% from 25 to 44, 16.5% from 45 to 64, and 4.9% who were 65 years of age or older. The median age was 25 years. For every 100 females, there were 92.8 males. For every 100 females age 18 and over, there were 86.3 males.

=== Income and poverty ===
The median income for a household in the CDP was $24,523, and the median income for a family was $24,951. Males had a median income of $24,032 versus $17,328 for females. The per capita income for the CDP was $7,967. About 38.3% of families and 39.2% of the population were below the poverty line, including 43.2% of those under age 18 and 47.5% of those age 65 or over. In 2010, estimated median household income was $31,805, which is 29.7% above the value in 2000 (it was $24,523 in 2000).

== Government ==
The Shiprock Chapter government is a branch of the Navajo Nation government which exercise varied delegated powers and governmental authority in accordance with Navajo statutory, regulatory, and common law. The basis of local government for the Navajo Reservation, the Chapter was initiated in 1922 as a means of improving agricultural conditions at a local level. Later the Chapter became the basic political subdivision of Navajo Tribal Government. The Chapters elect representatives to the Navajo Tribal Council, the legislative branch of Navajo government.

== Education ==
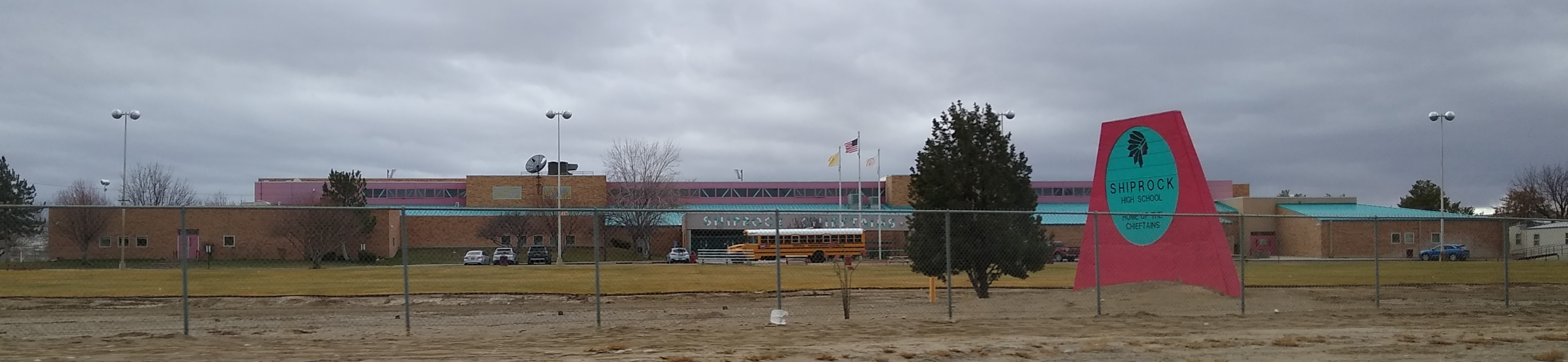
Shiprock High School

The Central Consolidated School District serves Shiprock as well as other communities in western San Juan County. Shiprock is home to Shiprock High School, Career Prep High School, Tsé Bit'a'í Middle School, Mesa Elementary School, Nizhoni Elementary School, Eva B. Stokely Elementary School

Shiprock Associated Schools, Inc., associated with the Bureau of Indian Education (BIE), operates Atsá Biyáázh Community School and Shiprock Northwest High School (7th to 12th grade).

== Media ==
=== Film location ===
The 1987 film Made in U.S.A. directed by Ken Friedman and starring Adrian Pasdar, Chris Penn and Lori Singer is partially referred to Shiprock.

The 2017 documentary Mayors of Shiprock focuses on the group of native youths who are making a positive change in their community.

== Notable people ==
- Joyce Begay-Foss, Navajo weaver, educator, and curator, was born in Shiprock.
- Eugenia Charles-Newton, Diné tribal councilor
- Amber Midthunder, Sioux actress best known for her work as Naru in the movie Prey, was born in Shiprock.
- Orville Tsinnie (1943–2017), Navajo silversmith and jeweler
