= Shiprock High School =

Public high school in Shiprock, New Mexico

Coordinates: 36°46′29″N 108°42′32″W

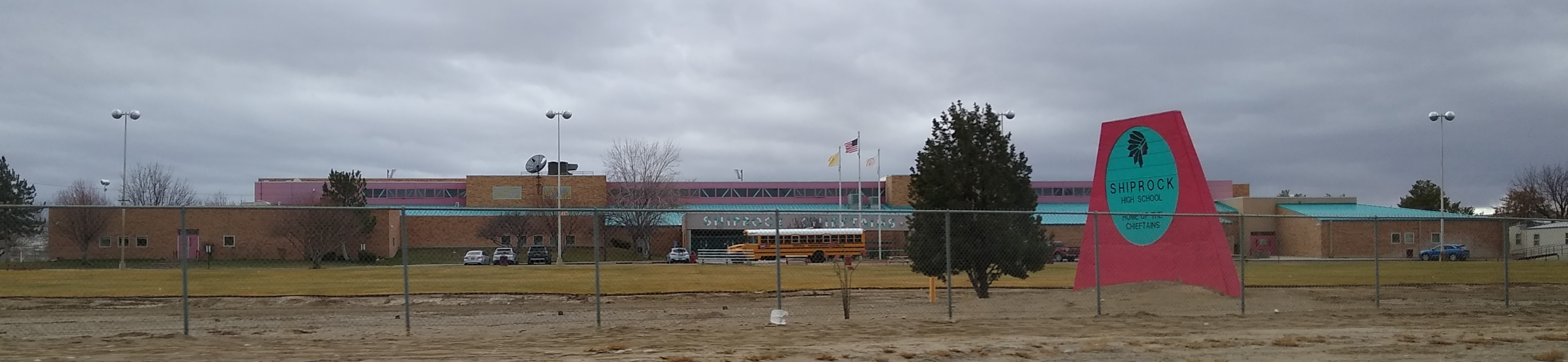

Location
- PO Box 3578; Shiprock, New Mexico 87420; United States

Information
- Type: Public High School
- Motto: "Once a Chieftain, Always a Chieftain!"
- Principal: Staci Gallagher
- Teaching staff: 40.00 (FTE)
- Grades: 9-12
- Enrollment: 539 (2023-2024)
- Student to teacher ratio: 13.48
- Colors: Crimson, Silver, Turquoise
- Athletics: NMAA; District 1-AAAA
- Mascot: Chieftain, Lady Chieftain
- Website: shs.centralschools.org

Shiprock High School is a public high school in Shiprock, New Mexico. Shiprock High is part of the Central Consolidated Schools along with Kirtland Central High School and Newcomb High School. The school colors are crimson, silver, and turquoise, and the school mascot is the Chieftain.

== Facilities ==
=== Performing arts center ===
Phil L. Thomas Performing Arts Center, is a performance space that is intended for use by various types of the performing arts, including dance, music, theatre and concerts. The school has been the host site for the Navajo Times All-Star banquet, which has invited athletes from both New Mexico and Arizona.

=== Performers ===
A list of performers who have visited and performed at Shiprock High School:

Performers
Artist	Year Visited	Genre
Indigo Girls :	2007	American Folk Rock
Campanas de America Campanas de America:	2010	Mariachi Band
Jo Dee Messina :	2010:	American Country Music
Tracy Lawrence :	2010	American Country Music
Clay Walker :	2010	American Country Music
Gretchen Wilson :	2011 :	American Country Music
Neal McCoy	2011	American Country Music
U.S. Air Force Academy Winds ensemble:	2011	Concert Band
Joe Nichols :	2012	American Country Music

=== Athletic facilities ===
Shiprock High School's largest sports facility, Chieftain Stadium, is used for football games, track and field meets, and can also be used for soccer games. There is also the Chieftain Pit :(basketball and volleyball) and the Natatorium (swimming). There are also baseball and softball fields, a 4-court tennis complex, a cross country course, a weight room, and basketball courts. The Navajo Nation and Shiprock High School hosted the 2011 Native Vision : Sports Camp on June 5–7. It involved 62 professional and collegiate athletes who volunteered to coach. Approximately 800 youth from over 15 tribal nations attended. Six sports clinics were offered, including football, basketball, volleyball, soccer, track and lacrosse.

== A tradition of excellence ==
Shiprock High School, home of the Chieftains and Lady Chieftains, competes in District 1-AAAA of the New Mexico Activities Association (NMAA), alongside Aztec, Bloomfield, Gallup, Kirtland Central, and Miyamura High Schools. Over the years, Shiprock athletics have earned 16 NMAA state championships and numerous District 1-AAA and 1-AAAA titles. The Lady Chieftains basketball team stands out with six state titles (1988, 1989, 1990, 1992, 2002, and 2017). The Shiprock JROTC program captured back-to-back state championships in 2017 and 2018.

District 1-AAAA, Shiprock High School, Aztec High School, Bloomfield High School, Gallup High School, Kirtland Central, Miyamura High School :

=== Chieftain Athletics ===
Shiprock High School participates in the following athletics :

Chieftains

- Baseball :
- Basketball :
- Cross Country :
- Football :
- Golf :
- Track & Field
- Wrestling :

Lady Chieftains

- Basketball :
- Cross Country :
- Golf :
- Soccer :
- Softball :
- Track & Field
- Volleyball :
- Wrestling :

=== Shiprock High School Athletic Rankings ===
- Chieftain Basketball Rankings :
- Lady Chieftain Basketball Rankings :
- NM Track & XC Coaches Association Top Ten Polls :

=== State Championships ===
Shiprock State Championships
Sport	Class	Year(s)
Basketball, Girls	AAAA	2017
Basketball, Girls	AAA	1988, 1989, 1990, 1992, 2002
Cross Country, Boys	AAA	1974, 2001
Cross Country, Girls	AAA	2001, 2004, 2012
Cross Country, Girls	AAAA	2015
Golf, Girls	A-AAA	2001, 2002
JROTC	A-AAAAA	2017, 2018

=== State Championship Scoreboard ===
Shiprock State Championship Scoreboard
Sport	Class	Year	Win/Loss	Score
Basketball, Girls	AAAA	2017	WIN	Shiprock 47-Hope 42
Basketball, Girls	AAAA	2016	L	Shiprock 48-Hope 51
Basketball, Girls	AAA	2014	L	Shiprock 59-Portales 62
Basketball, Girls	AAA	2011	L	Shiprock 22-Santa Fe Indian 43
Basketball, Girls	AAAA	2010	L	Shiprock 52-Kirtland Central 71
Basketball, Girls	AAA	2002	WIN	Shiprock 75-Portales 60
Basketball, Girls	AAA	1995	L	Shiprock 49-Kirtland Central 68
Basketball, Girls	AAA	1994	L	Shiprock 54-Kirtland Central 57
Basketball, Girls	AAA	1993	L	Shiprock 46-Kirtland Central 47
Basketball, Girls	AAA	1992	WIN	Shiprock 58-Kirtland Central 54
Basketball, Girls	AAA	1990	WIN	Shiprock 57-Kirtland Central 36
Basketball, Girls	AAA	1989	WIN	Shiprock 83-Kirtland Central 55
Basketball, Girls	AAA	1988	WIN	Shiprock 60-Kirtland Central 58
Basketball, Girls	AAA	1987	L	Shiprock 61-Kirtland Central 62
Basketball, Boys	B	1969	L	Shiprock 62-Eunice 87
Softball	AAA	2005	L	Shiprock 1-Grants 3
Softball	AAA	2001	L	Shiprock 5-Lovington 9

=== State Runner-up ===
Shiprock State Runner-up
Sport	Class	Year(s)
Cross Country, Girls	AAA	2000
Cross Country, Girls	AAAA	2014
Cross Country, Boys	AAA	1990, 1991, 2000, 2010, 2011
Basketball, Girls	AAA	1987, 1993, 1994, 1995, 2011, 2014
Basketball, Girls	AAAA	2010, 2016
Basketball, Boys (26-5)	B	1969
Softball	AAA	2001, 2005
Wrestling	AAA	2001

=== Individual State Champions ===
Shiprock Individual State Champions
Year	Class	Athlete	Sport
1974	AAA	Vinny Thomas	Men's Cross Country
1982	AAA	Albert Avery	Wrestling
1986	AAA	Keevin King	Wrestling
1989	AAA	Jerrold Golbe	Wrestling
1992	AAA	Jim Marcino	800 M. Dash/Track & Field
1993	AAA	Blaine Thomas	3200 M. Run/Track & Field
1993	AAA	Lance Foster	Men's Cross Country
1995	AAA	Lance Foster	800 M. Dash/Track & Field
1996	AAA	Kevin Price	Men's Golf
2001	AAA	Orlando Walter	300 M. Hurdles/Track & Field
2001	AAA	Orlando Franklin	Wrestling
2001	AAA	Brandon Bull	Wrestling
2001	AAA	Kevin Lee	Wrestling
2002	AAA	Terence Yesslith	1600 M. Run/Track & Field
2002	AAA	Orlando Franklin	Wrestling
2003	AAA	Nate King	Wrestling
2005	AAA	SHS Girls Track & Field Team	1600 Med.Relay/Track & Field
2005	AAA	Glynnis Price	Women's Golf
2006	AAA	Alister Buck	Wrestling
2011	AAA	Herbert Beyale III	Men's Cross Country
2012	AAA	Herbert Beyale III	3200/Track & Field
2016	AAAA	Julian Aspaas	Wrestling

=== District Championships ===
Shiprock 1-AAAA Championships
Sport	Year
Baseball	
Basketball, Girls	2014, 2015, 2016, 2017
Basketball, Boys	2007-08, 2013
Cross Country, Girls	
Cross Country, Boys	
Football	
Golf, Girls	
Golf, Boys	
Track & Field, Girls	
Track & Field, Boys	
Softball	
Volleyball	2009-10
Wrestling	2017

Shiprock 1-AAA Championships
Sport	Year
Baseball	2010-11
Basketball, Girls	1988-89, 2001–02, 2005–06, 2010–11, 2011–12
Basketball, Boys	2001-02, 2005–06, 2011–12, 2013-14
Cross Country, Girls	2005-2006, 2011-2012
Cross Country, Boys	2011-2012
Football	2000-01, 2010–11
Golf, Girls	
Golf, Boys	
Track & Field, Girls	
Track & Field, Boys	
Softball	
Volleyball	2001-02, 2004–05, 2010–11
Wrestling	

== Shiprock High School national mention ==
- Rocks With Wings, Documentary, USA Today :
- Rocks With Wings, Documentary, New York Times :
- Rocks With Wings, Documentary, Montreal Mirror, :
- Native Vision, Johns Hopkins :
