= 2026 Paradise Jam =

College basketball competition

2026 U.S. Virgin Islands Paradise Jam
- Season: 2026–27
- Teams: 8 men's; 12 women's
- Finals site: Elridge Wilburn Blake Sports and Fitness Center, Charlotte Amalie West, U.S. Virgin Islands

The 2026 U.S. Virgin Islands Paradise Jam is an early-season men's and women's college basketball tournament. The tournament, which began in 2000, is part of the 2026–27 NCAA Division I men's basketball season and 2026–27 NCAA Division I women's basketball season. The tournament will be played at the Elridge Wilburn Blake Sports and Fitness Center in Charlotte Amalie West, Saint Thomas, United States Virgin Islands.

== Teams ==
=== Men's teams ===
Team	Most Recent Appearance	Best Finish
East Carolina	2009	Seventh (2009)
Indiana State	2015	Third (2015)
Middle Tennessee State	2006	Seventh (2006)
Southern Illinois	2021	Fifth (2021)
Stephen F. Austin	Initial	N/A
Temple	Initial	N/A
UT Martin	Initial	N/A
Utah Valley	Initial	N/A

=== Women's teams ===
Team	Most Recent Appearance	Best Finish
Air Force	Initial	N/A/
Baylor	2019	Second (2008, 2019)
Colorado State	Initial	N/A/
Grambling State	Initial	N/A/
Little Rock	Initial	N/A
Penn State	2006	Second (2000)
Santa Clara	Initial	N/A/
Seton Hall	2022	First (2022)
South Florida	2023	Second (2008, 2014)
Tennessee Tech	Initial	N/A/
Texas Tech	2024	First (2000)
Xavier	2013	Second (2006)

== Men's tournament ==
Matchups for the Men's Paradise Jam were unveiled July 28, 2026.

Fourth Place; Monday, November 23; ESPN+
Middle Tennessee
Southern Illinois
Seventh Place; Monday, November 23; ESPN+
Indiana State
East Carolina

Consolation Semifinal; Saturday, November 21; ESPN+
Middle Tennessee	69
Indiana State	59
Southern Illinois	85
East Carolina	69

Opening Round; Friday, November 20; ESPN+
Temple	85
Middle Tennessee	76
Indiana State	76
Stephen F. Austin	86
UT Martin	76
Southern Illinois	73
East Carolina	79
Utah Valley	90

Championship Semifinal; Sunday, November 22; ESPN+
Temple
Stephen F. Austin
UT Martin
Utah Valley

Championship; Monday, November 23; ESPN+
Third Place; Monday, November 23; ESPN+

NOTE: loser of Third Place game finishes in Fifth Place; loser of Fourth Place game finishes in Sixth Place.

== Women's tournament ==
The women's tournament bracket was unveiled July 28, 2026.

=== Harbor division ===
Third Place; Friday, November 27

Opening Round; Thursday, November 26
Little Rock
Tennessee Tech
Grambling State
Colorado State

Championship; Friday, November 27

=== Island division ===
Third Place; Saturday, November 28

Opening Round; Thursday, November 26
Air Force
Texas Tech
Xavier
Santa Clara

Championship; Saturday, November 28

=== Reef division ===
Third Place; Saturday, November 28

Opening Round; Friday, November 27
Penn State
Baylor
South Florida
Seton Hall

Championship; Saturday, November 28
