= 2023 Paradise Jam =

- Season: 2023–24
- Teams: 8 men's; 8 women's
- Finals site: Sports and Fitness Center, Saint Thomas, U.S. Virgin Islands
- Champions: Missouri State (men's); NC State (women's Island); Texas (women's Reef)
- MVP: Matthew Lee, Missouri State (men's); River Baldwin, NC State (women's Island); Rori Harmon, Texas (women's Reef)

The 2023 Paradise Jam is an early-season men's and women's college basketball tournament. The tournament, which began in 2000, is part of the 2023–24 NCAA Division I men's basketball season and 2023–24 NCAA Division I women's basketball season. The tournament is played at the Sports and Fitness Center in Saint Thomas, U.S. Virgin Islands.

== Teams ==
=== Men's teams ===
Team	Most Recent Appearance	Best Finish
Abilene Christian	First Appearance	N/A
Florida Gulf Coast	First Appearance	N/A
Fordham	2019	6th (2005, 2019)
Hampton	2003	4th (2003)
Kent State	First Appearance	N/A
Missouri State	First Appearance	N/A
Norfolk State	2015	Runner-up (2011)
San Jose State	First Appearance	N/A

=== Women's teams ===
Team	Most Recent Appearance	Best Finish
Arizona State	2006	Champions (2001)
Cincinnati	First Appearance	N/A
Colorado	First Appearance	N/A
High Point	First Appearance	N/A
Kentucky	2018	Champions (2014, 2018)
NC State	2016	Champions (2004)
South Florida	2018	Runner-up (2008, 2014)
Texas	2013	Champions (2001)

== Men's tournament ==
The men's tournament bracket was announced on June 25, 2023.

5th Place Game; November 20
San Jose State	71
Hampton	52
7th Place Game
Norfolk State	69
Florida Gulf Coast	66

Consolation 2nd Round; November 18
Norfolk State	53
San Jose State	77
Hampton	92
Florida Gulf Coast	85

First Round; November 17
Norfolk State	64
Fordham	77
Abilene Christian	77
San Jose State	71
Hampton	62
Kent State	100
Missouri State	70
Florida Gulf Coast	61

Semifinals; November 19
Fordham	45
Abilene Christian	59
Kent State	52
Missouri State	56

Championship; November 20
Abilene Christian	69
Missouri State	87
3rd Place Game
Fordham	72
Kent State	79

== Women's tournament ==
The women's tournament bracket was also announced on June 25, 2023.

=== Island division ===
November 23
Cincinnati	60
No. 3 Colorado	77

November 23
Kentucky	55
No. 10 NC State	84

November 24
Kentucky	53
No. 3 Colorado	96

November 24
Cincinnati	45
No. 10 NC State	79

November 25
No. 3 Colorado	60
No. 10 NC State	78

November 25
Cincinnati	65
Kentucky	41

=== Reef division ===
November 23
High Point	32
South Florida	61

November 23
Arizona State	42
No. 12 Texas	84

November 24
Arizona State	66
South Florida	49

November 24
High Point	39
No. 12 Texas	101

November 25
High Point	69
Arizona State	77

November 25
South Florida	44
No. 12 Texas	76
