= 2024 Paradise Jam =

College basketball competition

2024 U.S. Virgin Islands Paradise Jam
- Season: 2024–25
- Teams: 8 men's; 8 women's
- Finals site: Elridge Wilburn Blake Sports and Fitness Center, Charlotte Amalie West, Saint Thomas, United States Virgin Islands
- Champions: Liberty (men's); Kansas (women's Island); Florida State (women's Reef)
- MVP: Colin Porter, Liberty (men's); S'Mya Nichols, Kansas (women's Island); Ta’Niya Latson, Florida State (women's Reef)

The 2024 U.S. Virgin Islands Paradise Jam was an early-season men's and women's college basketball tournament. The tournament, which began in 2000, was part of the 2024–25 NCAA Division I men's basketball season and 2024–25 NCAA Division I women's basketball season. The tournament was played at the Elridge Wilburn Blake Sports and Fitness Center in Charlotte Amalie West, Saint Thomas, United States Virgin Islands.

== Teams ==
=== Men's teams ===
Team	Most Recent Appearance	Best Finish
UAB	2001	Fourth (2001)
George Washington	Initial	N/A
Illinois State	2019	Runner-Up (2014)
Kansas State	2018	Champion (2018)
Liberty	2017	Seventh (2017)
Longwood	Initial	N/A
Louisiana	Initial	N/A
McNeese	Initial	N/A

=== Women's teams ===
Team	Most Recent Appearance	Best Finish
Auburn	2006	Fourth (2006)
Florida State	2016	Champion (2016)
Gonzaga	2016	Fourth (2016)
Kansas	2013	Fourth (2013)
Missouri State	2003	Champion (2003)
Northern Iowa	Initial	N/A
Pittsburgh	2021	Runner-Up (2016)
Texas Tech	2008	Champion (2000)

== Men's tournament ==
Matchups for the Men's Paradise Jam were unveiled July 9, 2024.

=== 2024 ===
==== Men's ====
Fourth Place; Monday, November 25
Illinois State	64
George Washington	72
Seventh Place; Monday, November 25
UAB	98
Louisiana	86

Consolation Semifinal; Saturday, November 23
UAB	83
Illinois State	84
Louisiana	74
George Washington	83

Opening Round; Friday, November 22
Longwood	89
UAB	81
Illinois State	68
McNeese	76
Louisiana	69
Liberty	89
George Washington	71
Kansas State	83

Championship Semifinal; Sunday, November 24
Longwood	69
McNeese	84
Liberty	67
Kansas State	65

Championship; Monday, November 25
McNeese	58
Liberty	62
Third Place; Monday, November 25
Longwood	64
Kansas State	80

* – Denotes overtime period
NOTE: loser of Third Place game finishes in Fifth Place; loser of Fourth Place game finishes in Sixth Place.

== Women's tournament ==
The women's tournament bracket was unveiled April 18, 2024.

=== Island division ===
Thursday, November 28
Pittsburgh	53
Kansas	59

Thursday, November 28
Northern Iowa	64
Auburn	65

Friday, November 29
Auburn	82
Pittsburgh	50

Friday, November 29
Kansas	76
Northern Iowa	73

Saturday, November 30
Northern Iowa	90
Pittsburgh	74

Saturday, November 30
Auburn	60
Kansas	61

=== Reef division ===
Thursday, November 28
Missouri State	65
Gonzaga	64

Thursday, November 28
Texas Tech	62
Florida State	70

Friday, November 29
Florida State	97
Missouri State	66

Friday, November 29
Gonzaga	49
Texas Tech	67

Saturday, November 30
Texas Tech	72
Missouri State	69

Saturday, November 30
Florida State	95
Gonzaga	54
