= Paradise Jam =

NCAA college basketball tournament

Coordinates: 18.340096°N 64.97306°W

- Sport: College basketball
- Founded: 2000 (women's), 2001 (men's)
- Founder: Basketball Travelers, Inc.
- No. of teams: 8 men's teams, 8 women's teams (12 beginning in 2025)
- Country: United States
- Venues: Elridge Wilburn Blake Sports and Fitness Center, Charlotte Amalie, Saint Thomas, U.S. Virgin Islands
- Most recent champions: Men: Yale; Women - • Island: Vanderbilt • Reef: LSU • Harbor: Boise State
- Broadcasters: ESPN3 & ESPN+
- Website: U. S. Virgin Islands Paradise Jam

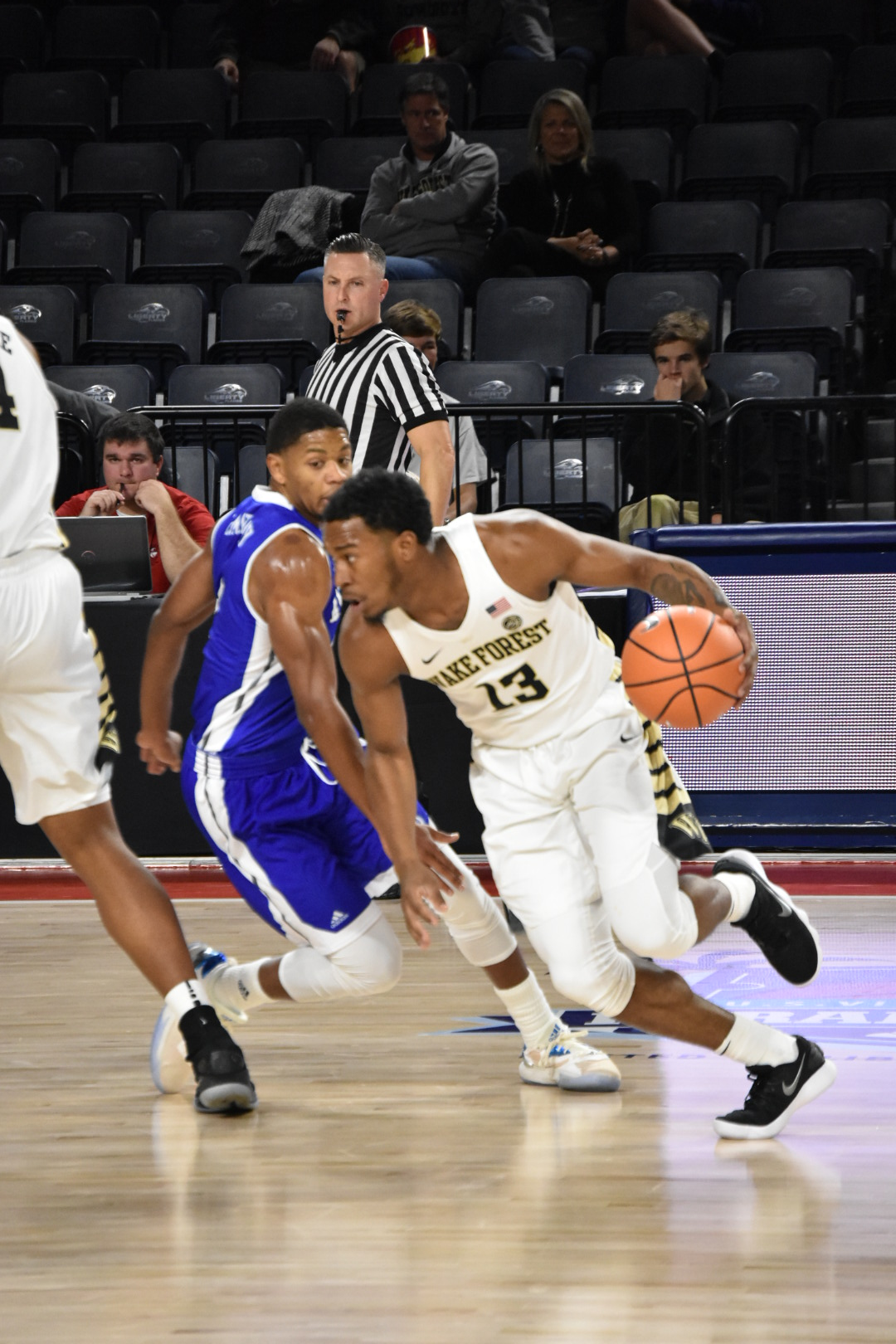
Game 4 of the 2017 Paradise Jam featured the Wake Forest Demon Deacons and the Drake Bulldogs. Due to hurricane damage, this particular year was not held in the U.S. Virgin Islands

The U.S. Virgin Islands Paradise Jam is an NCAA college basketball tournament that takes place annually in late November. The men's tournament typically takes place the week before Thanksgiving, with the women's tournament occurring during Thanksgiving week. It is held at the Elridge Wilburn Blake Sports and Fitness Center on the campus of the University of the Virgin Islands in Charlotte Amalie, Saint Thomas, U. S. Virgin Islands. Liberty is the defending men's champion. Kansas and Florida State are the defending women's champions in the Island and Reef divisions, respectively.

== Format ==
Paradise Jam began in 2000 as a women's basketball tournament; a men's tournament was added the following year. In its current format, both tournaments feature eight teams that each play three games.

=== Men's format ===
The men's tournament was introduced in 2001 with a six-team, three-game group play format. In 2006, the tournament was expanded to eight teams and a bracket format was adopted. All teams play three games in the tournament, with the final day's games determining the tournament standings: a championship game, third-place game, fifth-place game, and seventh-place game are all played.

=== Women's format ===
The format of the women's tournament has changed multiple times throughout the existence of Paradise Jam. The first tournament in 2000 featured four teams that played two games each. In 2001, the women's tournament was altered to include three divisions — St. Thomas, St. John, and St. Croix. The following year, the St. Croix division was dropped, and two divisions were used going forward. In 2008, the format was adjusted to feature the Reef and Island divisions with four teams playing in each division. All teams play three games in the tournament, with the final day's games determining placement in all positions, first through fourth in each division. In 2025, the women’s tournament features the Reef Tournament, the Island Tournament, and the Harbor Tournament. Each tournament includes four teams, and each team will play two games.

== Tournament history ==
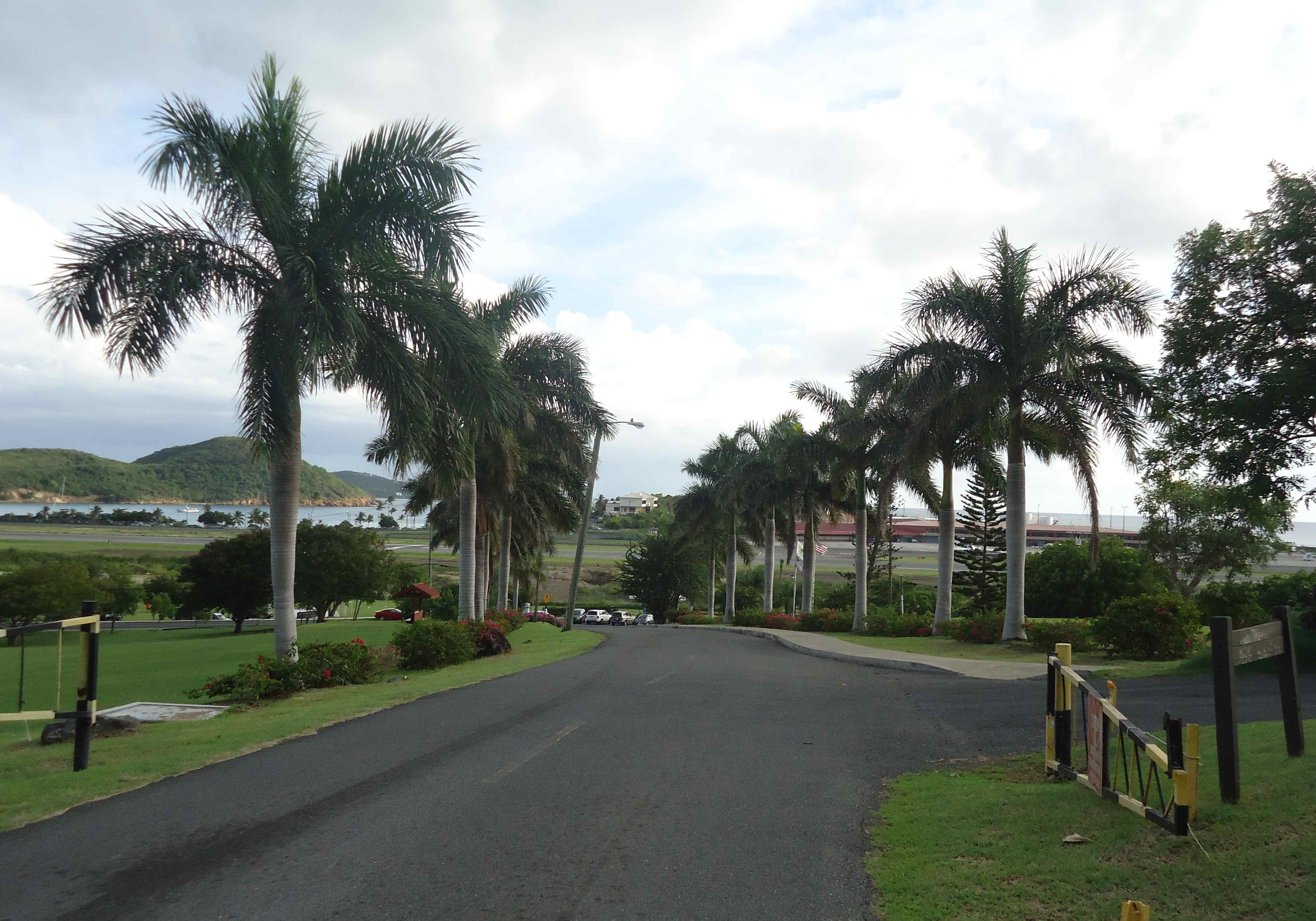
View from the University of the Virgin Islands campus

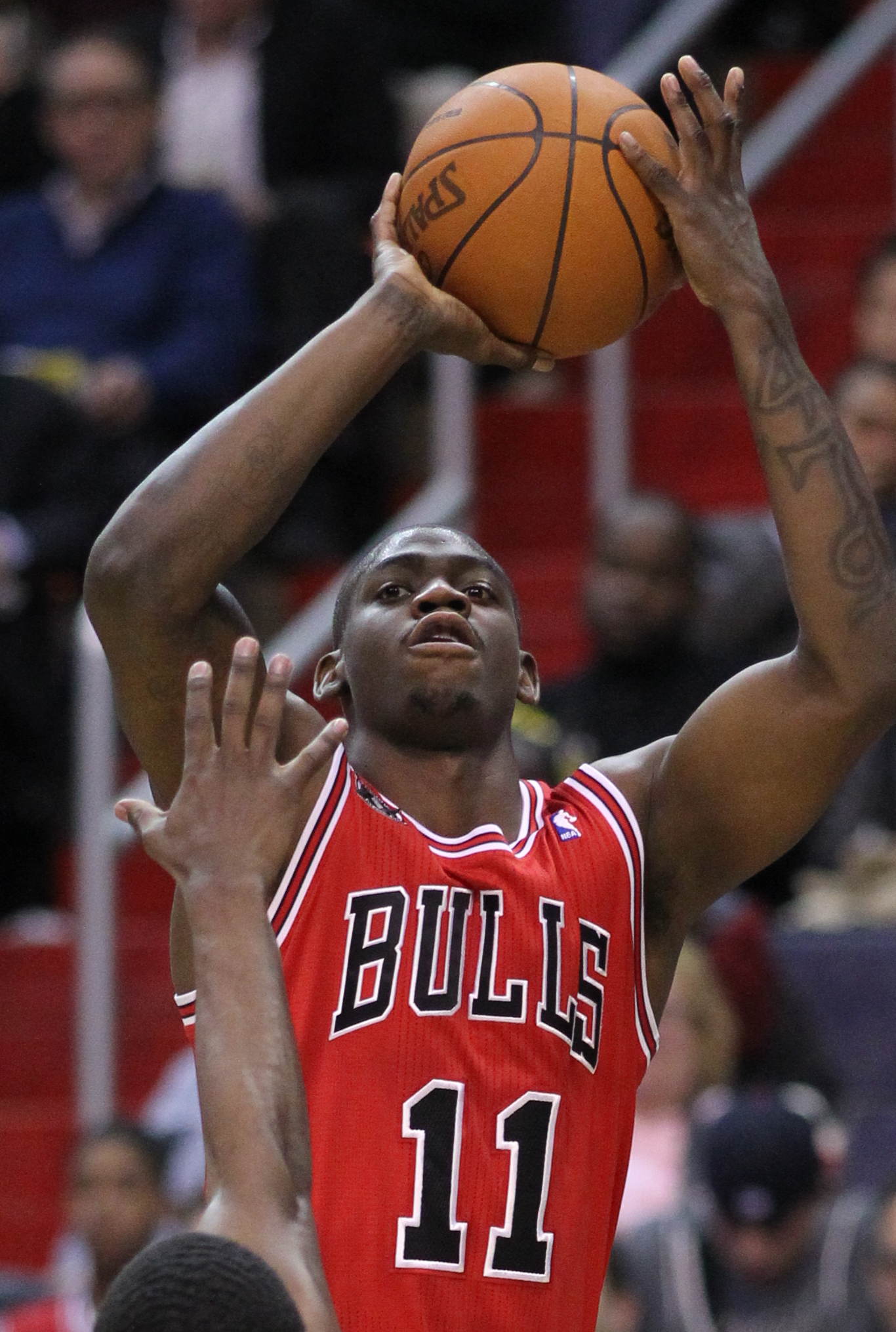
2004 tournament MVP, Arkansas's Ronnie Brewer, with the Chicago Bulls in 2011

2005 tournament champion Wisconsin

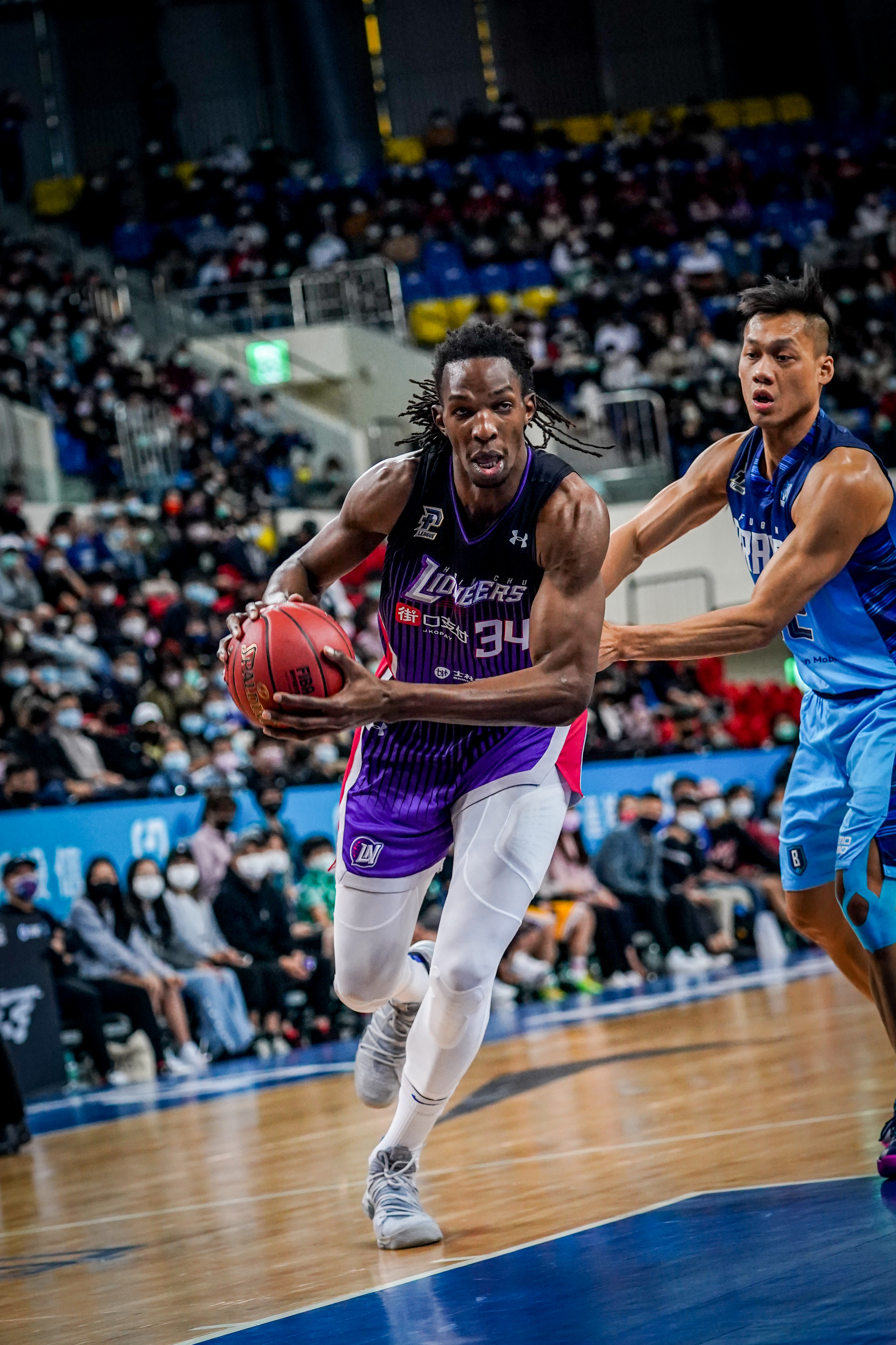
2008 tournament MVP, UConn's Hasheem Thabeet, as part of the Hsinchu JKO Lioneers in 2020

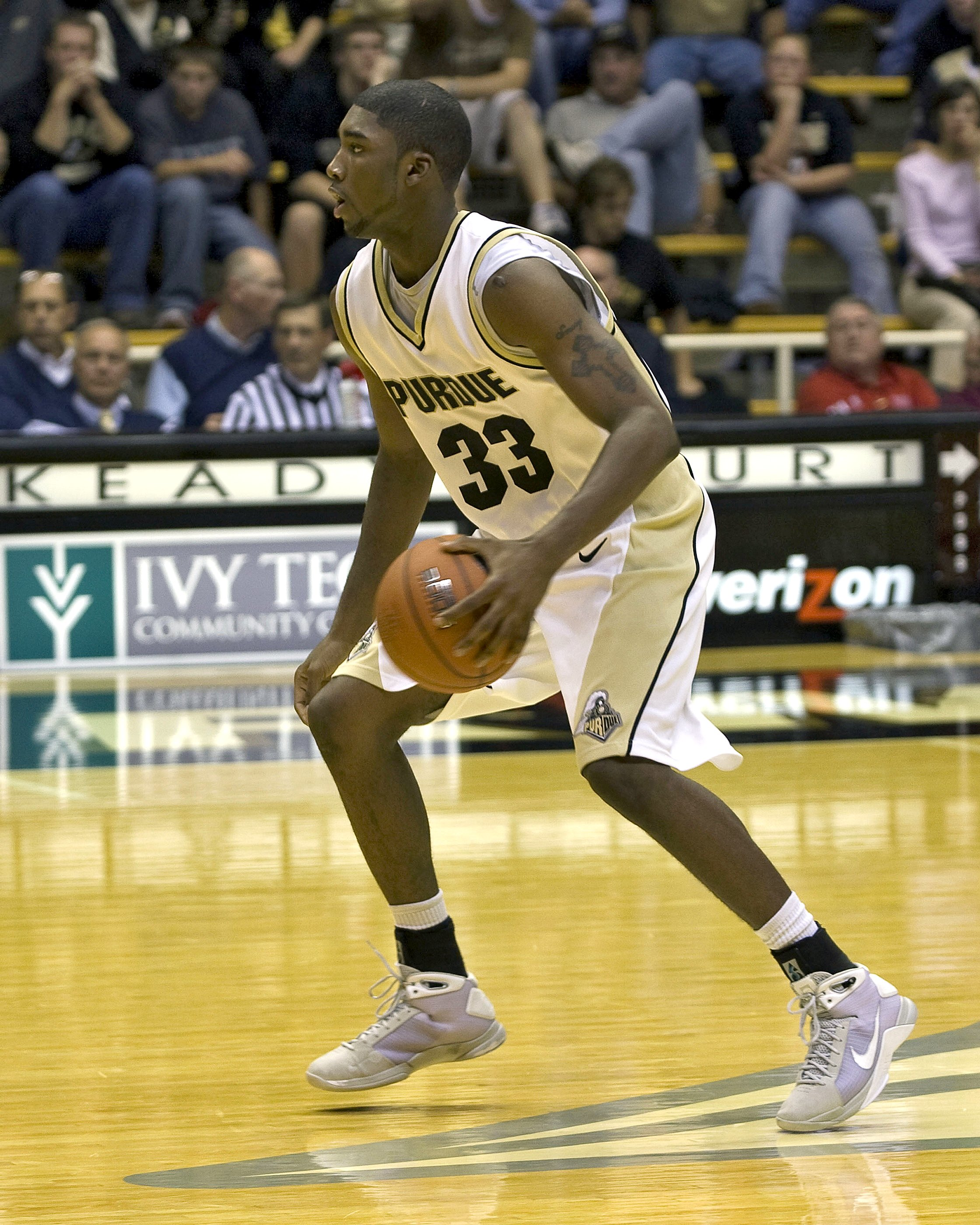
2009 tournament MVP, Purdue's E'Twaun Moore

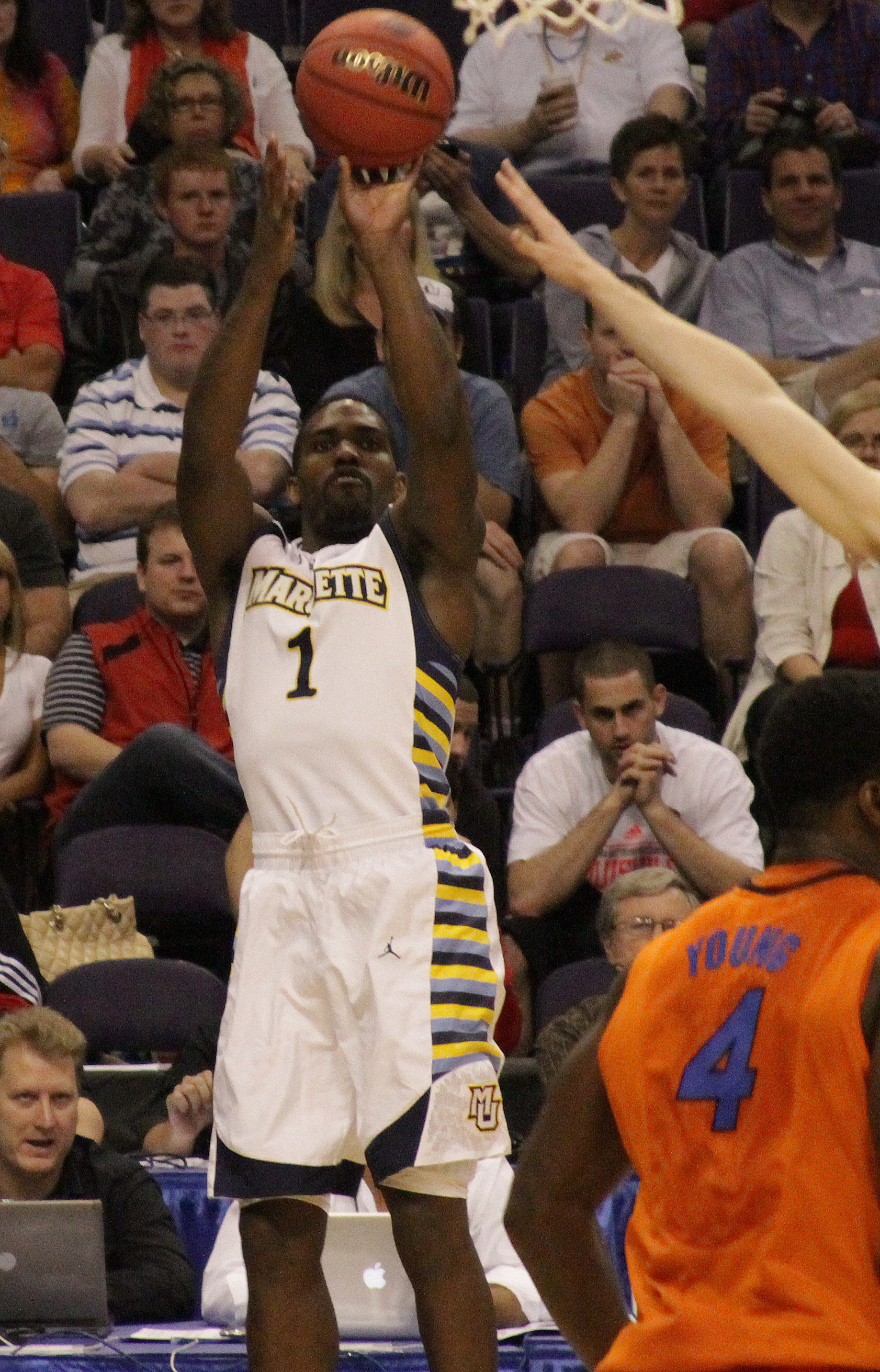
2011 tournament MVP, Marquette's Darius Johnson-Odom

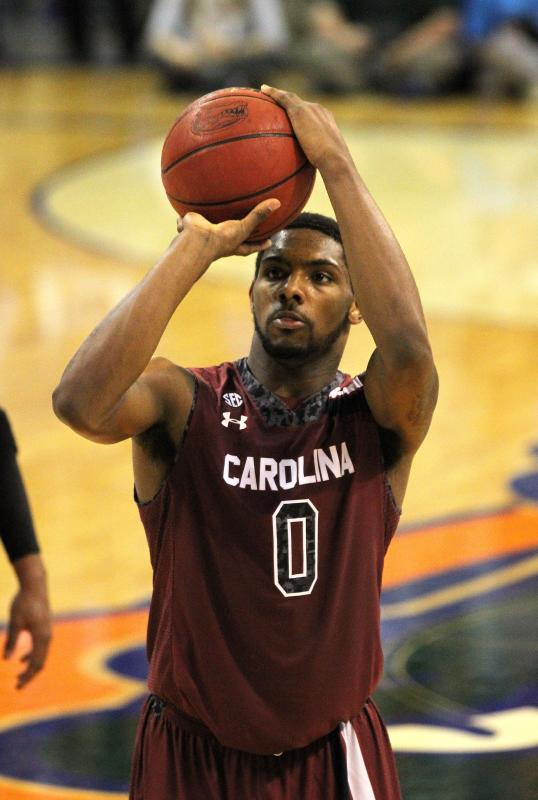
2015 tournament MVP, South Carolina's Sindarius Thornwell

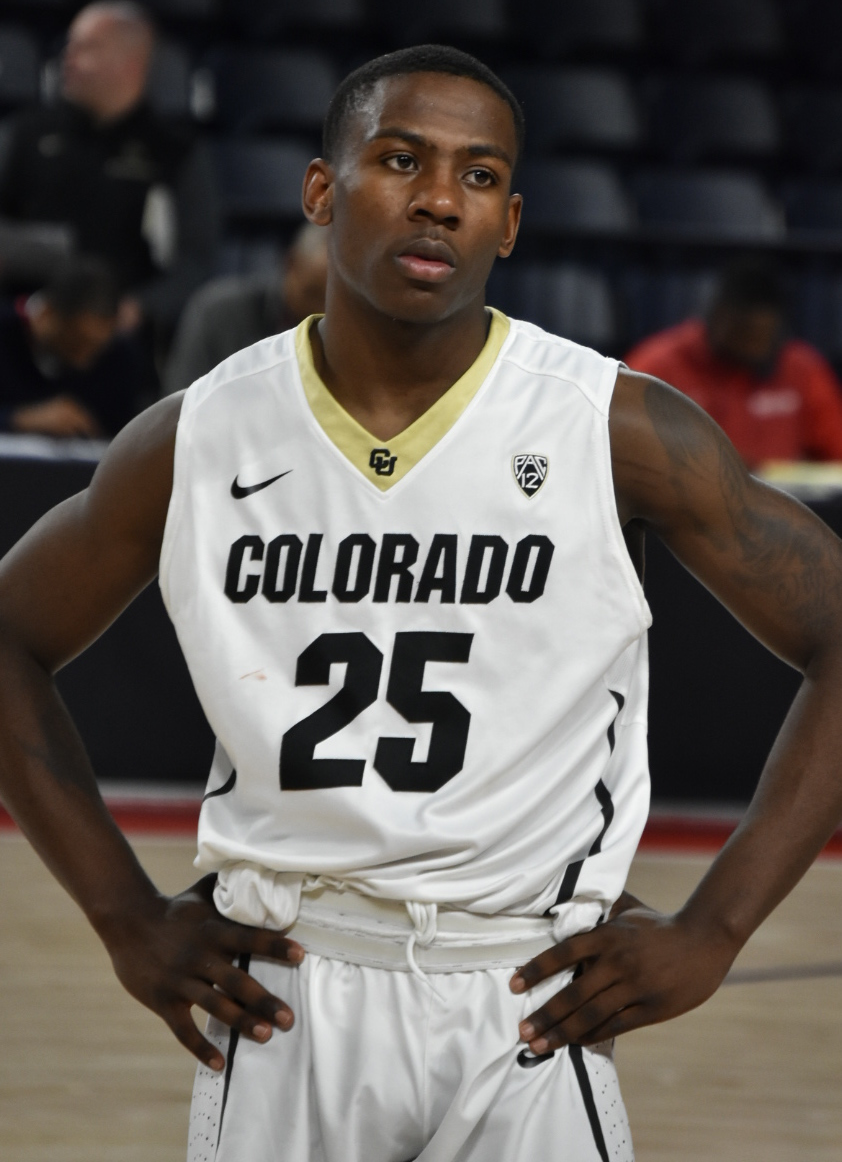
2017 tournament MVP, Colorado's McKinley Wright IV

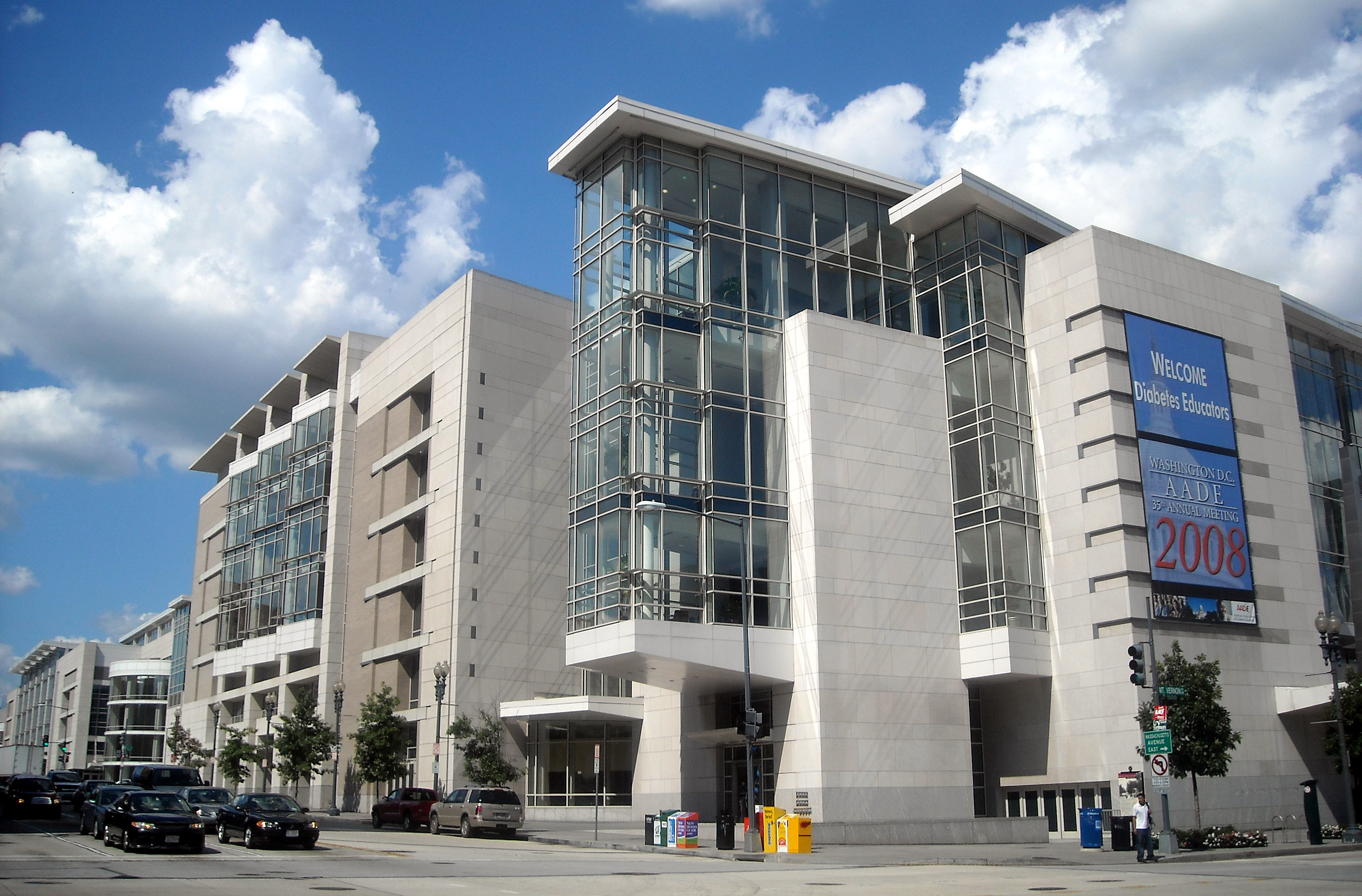
Walter E. Washington Convention Center in Washington, D.C., hosted the 2020 tournament as a result of the COVID-19 pandemic

2021 tournament champion Colorado State

=== Men's tournament ===
Year	Champion	Runner-up	Score	Third place	Tournament MVP	Participating Teams
2001	Miami	Clemson	67–65	La Salle (63–58 over UAB)	John Salmons, Miami	UAB; Clemson; Eastern Michigan; La Salle; Miami; Morris Brown
2002	BYU	St. Bonaventure	66–57	Virginia Tech (58–45 over Toledo)	Marques Green, St. Bonaventure	BYU; Kansas State; Michigan; St. Bonaventure; Toledo; Virginia Tech
2003	Boston College	Wichita State	84–81	Monmouth (64–52 over Hampton)	Craig Smith, Boston College	Appalachian State; Boston College; Hampton; La Salle; Monmouth; Wichita State
2004	Arkansas	Eastern Michigan	82–64	Winthrop (52–36 over Austin Peay)	Ronnie Brewer, Arkansas	Arkansas; Austin Peay; Eastern Michigan; Saint Louis; Troy; Winthrop
2005	Wisconsin	Old Dominion	84–81	Georgia (76–68 over Eastern Kentucky)	Alando Tucker, Wisconsin	Eastern Kentucky; Fordham; Georgia; Norfolk State; Old Dominion; Wisconsin
2006	Alabama	Xavier	63–56	Villanova (89–60 over Iowa)	Alonzo Gee, Alabama	Alabama; Charleston; Iowa; Middle Tennessee; Toledo; Villanova; VCU; Xavier
2007	Baylor	Winthrop	62–54	Georgia Tech (70–69 over Notre Dame)	Curtis Jerrells, Baylor	Baylor; Charlotte; Georgia Tech; UIC; Monmouth; Notre Dame; Wichita State; Winthrop
2008	Connecticut	Wisconsin	76–57	Miami (80–45 over San Diego)	Hasheem Thabeet, Connecticut	Connecticut; Iona; La Salle; Miami; San Diego; Southern Miss; Valparaiso; Wisconsin
2009	Purdue	Tennessee	73–72	DePaul (58–51 over Saint Joseph's)	E’Twaun Moore, Purdue	Boston College; DePaul; East Carolina; Northern Iowa; Purdue; Saint Joseph's; South Dakota State; Tennessee
2010	Old Dominion	Xavier	67–58	Clemson (64–58 over Seton Hall)	Ben Finney, Old Dominion	Alabama; Clemson; Iowa; Long Beach State; Old Dominion; Saint Peter's; Seton Hall; Xavier
2011	Marquette	Norfolk State	59–57	Ole Miss (80–69 over TCU)	Darius Johnson-Odom, Marquette	Drake; Drexel; Marquette; Ole Miss; Norfolk State; TCU; Virginia; Winthrop
2012	New Mexico	Connecticut	66–60	George Mason (74–58 over Quinnipiac)	Kendall Williams, New Mexico	Connecticut; George Mason; UIC; Iona; Mercer; New Mexico; Quinnipiac; Wake Forest
2013	Maryland	Providence	56–52	Northern Iowa (65–50 over La Salle)	Dez Wells, Maryland	La Salle; Loyola Marymount; Marist; Maryland; Morgan State; Northern Iowa; Providence; Vanderbilt
2014	Seton Hall	Illinois State	84–80	Old Dominion (56–48 over Gardner-Webb)	Sterling Gibbs, Seton Hall	Clemson; Gardner-Webb; Illinois State; LSU; Nevada; Old Dominion; Seton Hall; Weber State
2015	South Carolina	Tulsa	83–75	Indiana State (67–66 over Hofstra)	Sindarius Thornwell, South Carolina	DePaul; Florida State; Hofstra; Indiana State; Norfolk State; Ohio; South Carolina; Tulsa
2016	Creighton	Ole Miss	86–77	NC State (73–63 over Saint Joseph's)	Marcus Foster, Creighton	Creighton; Loyola; Ole Miss; Montana; NC State; Oral Roberts; Saint Joseph's; Washington State
2017	Colorado	Mercer	79–70	Drake (90–88 over Drexel)	McKinley Wright IV, Colorado	Colorado; Drake; Drexel; Houston; Liberty; Mercer; Quinnipiac; Wake Forest
2018	Kansas State	Missouri	82–67	Oregon State (74–58 over Penn)	Dean Wade, Kansas State	Eastern Kentucky; Kansas State; Kennesaw State; Missouri; Northern Iowa; Old Dominion; Oregon State; Penn
2019	Nevada	Bowling Green	77–62	Cincinnati (81–77 over Valparaiso)	Jalen Harris, Nevada	Bowling Green; Cincinnati; Fordham; Grand Canyon; Illinois State; Nevada; Valparaiso; Western Kentucky
2020 (Note: The 2020 tournament was condensed and played at Walter E. Washington Convention Center in Washington, D.C. due to the COVID-19 pandemic.)	Belmont	George Mason	77-67	Queens (N.C.) (85–71 over Howard)	Luke Smith, Belmont	Belmont; George Mason; Howard; Queens
2021	Colorado State	Northeastern	71–61	Creighton (66–64 over Southern Illinois)	David Roddy, Colorado State	Bradley; Brown; Colorado; Colorado State; Creighton; Duquesne; Northeastern; Southern Illinois
2022	Drake	Tarleton	71–64	Boston College (59–48 over Wyoming)	Tucker DeVries, Drake	Belmont; Boston College; Buffalo; Drake; George Mason; Howard; Tarleton State; Wyoming
2023	Missouri State	Abilene Christian	87–69	Kent State (79–72 over Fordham)	Matthew Lee, Missouri State	Abilene Christian; Florida Gulf Coast; Fordham; Hampton; Kent State; Missouri State; Norfolk State; San Jose State
2024	Liberty	McNeese	62–58	Kansas State (80–64 over Longwood)	Colin Porter, Liberty	UAB; George Washington; Illinois State; Kansas State; Liberty; Longwood; Louisiana; McNeese
2025	Yale	Akron	97–94	Charleston (78–59 over Evansville)	Nick Townsend (Yale)	Akron; Charleston; Evansville; Green Bay; Iona; Oregon State; UMass; Yale
2026						East Carolina; Indiana State; Middle Tennessee State; Southern Illinois; Stephen F. Austin; Temple; UT Martin; Utah Valley

=== Women's tournament ===
The first ever Paradise Jam champion, the 2000 Texas Tech Lady Raiders

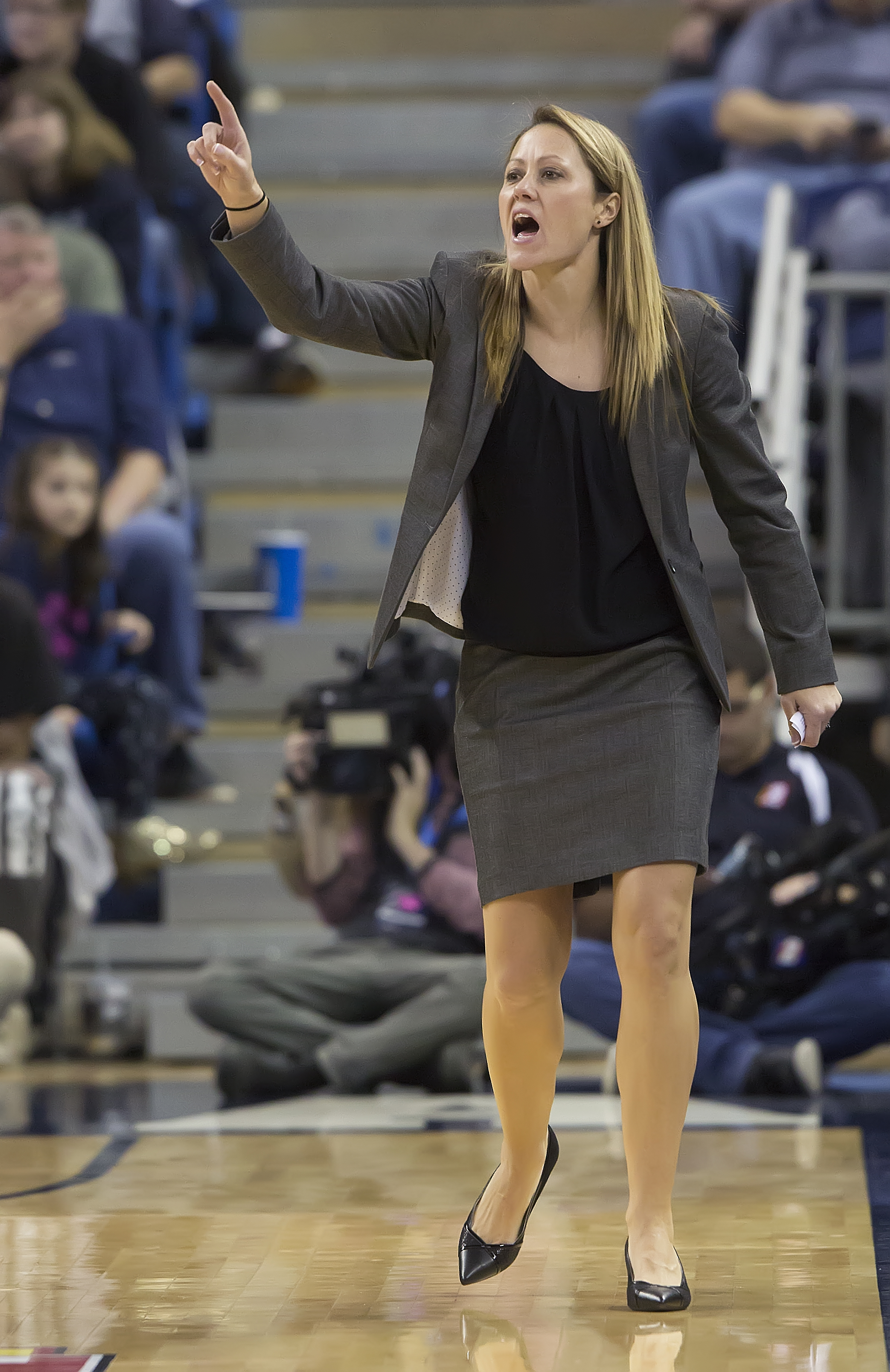
2001 St. John tournament MVP, Arizona State's Amanda Levens, as head coach of Nevada in 2017

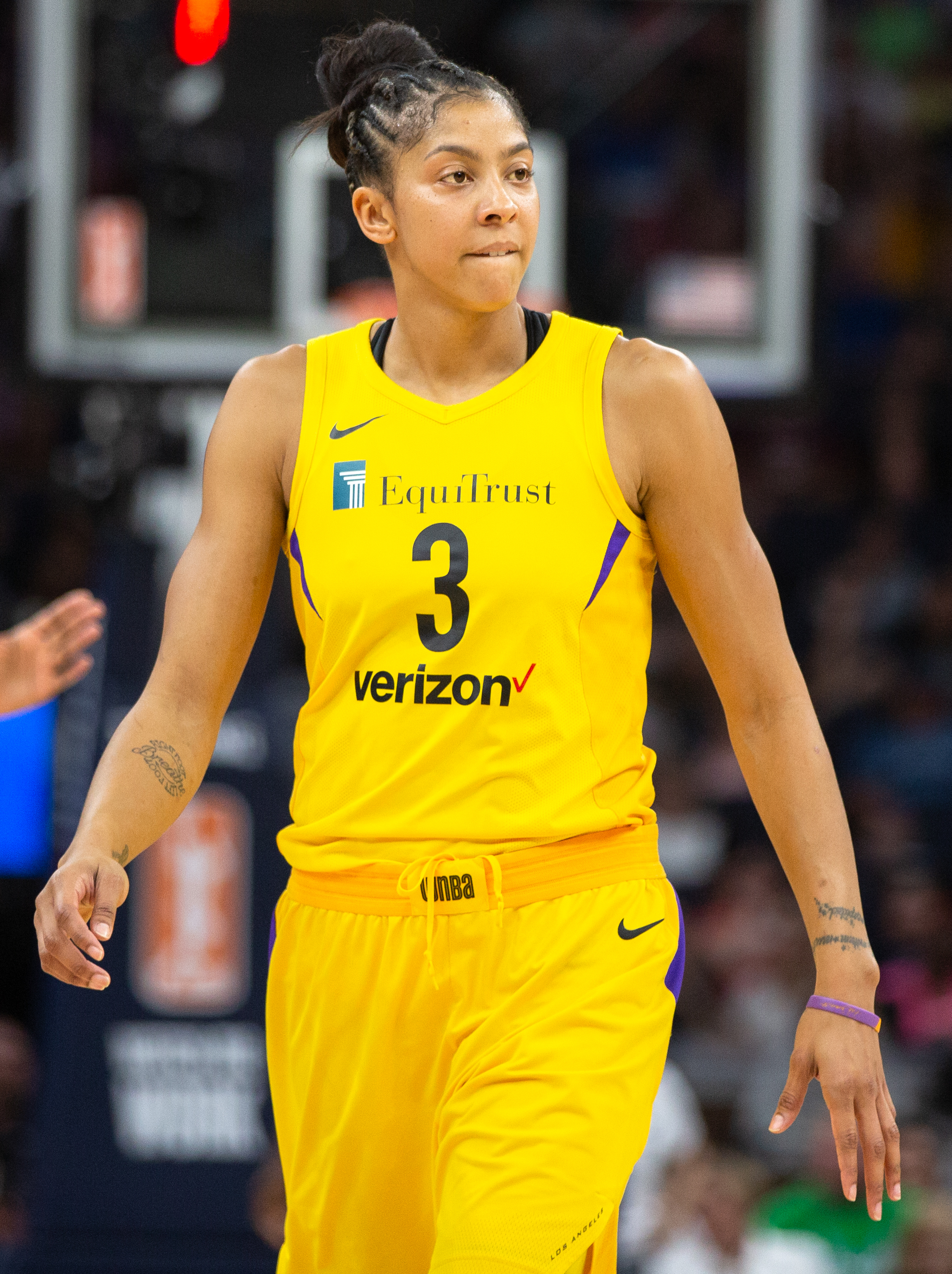
2005 St. John tournament MVP, Tennessee's Candace Parker, with the Los Angeles Sparks in 2017

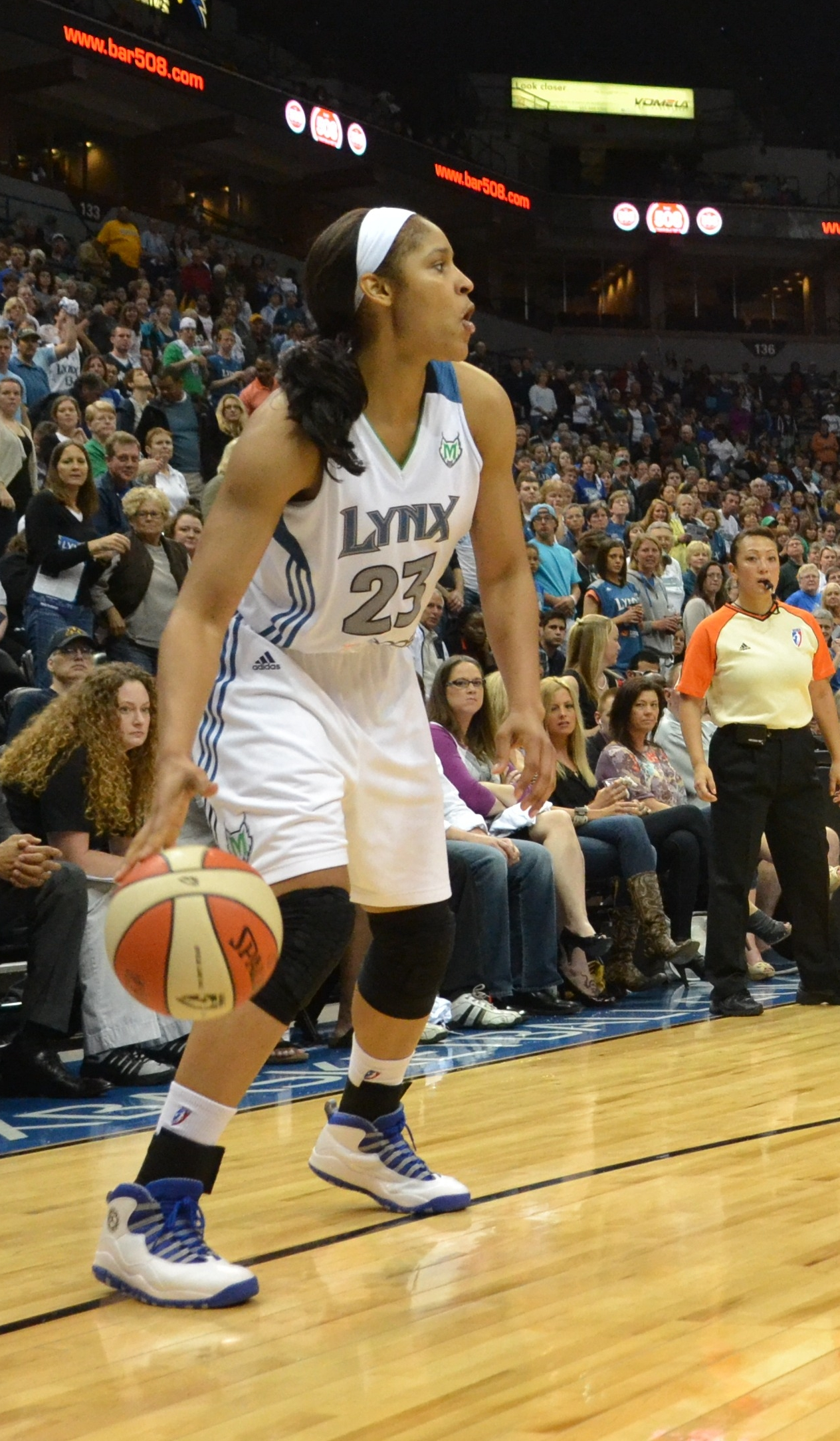
2007 St. Thomas tournament MVP, UConn's Maya Moore, with the Minnesota Lynx in 2012

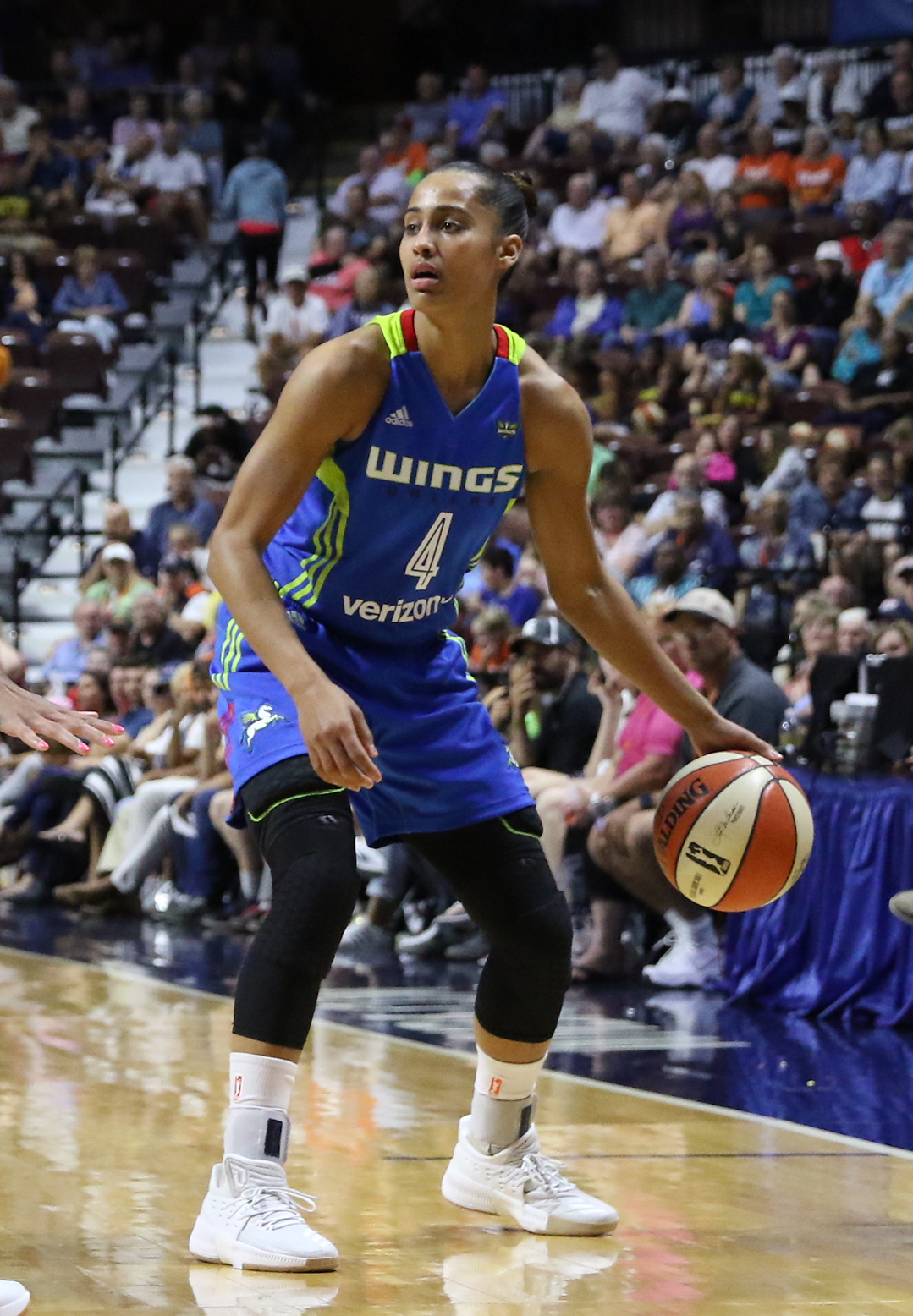
2009 Island tournament MVP, Notre Dame's Skylar Diggins, with the Dallas Wings in 2017

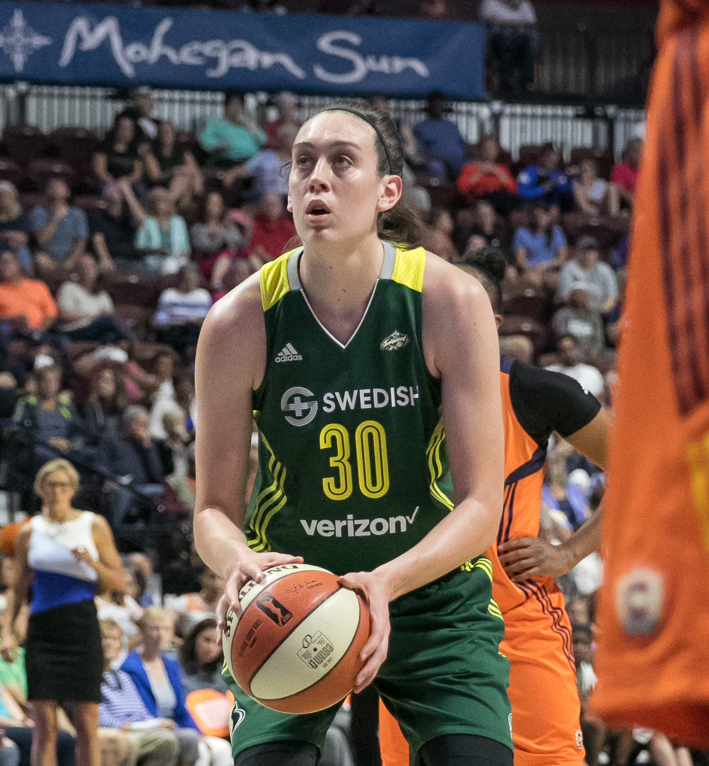
2012 Island tournament MVP, UConn's Breanna Stewart, with the Seattle Storm in 2017

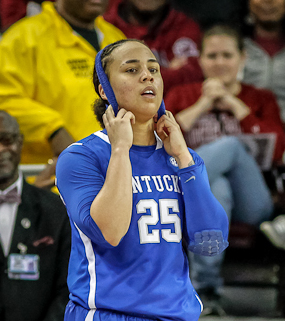
2014 Reef tournament MVP, Kentucky's Makayla Epps

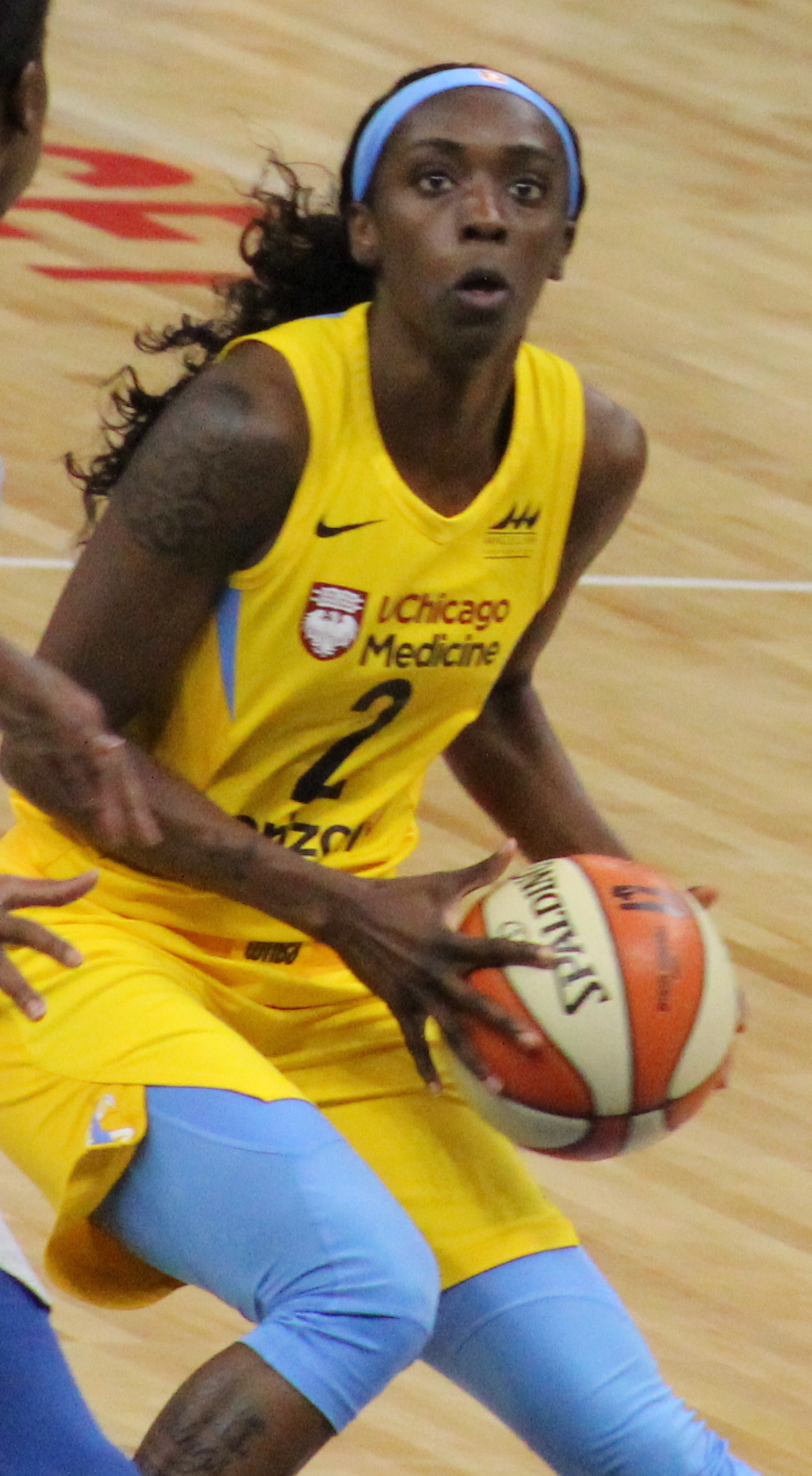
2015 Island tournament MVP, Rutgers' Kahleah Copper, with the Chicago Sky in 2018

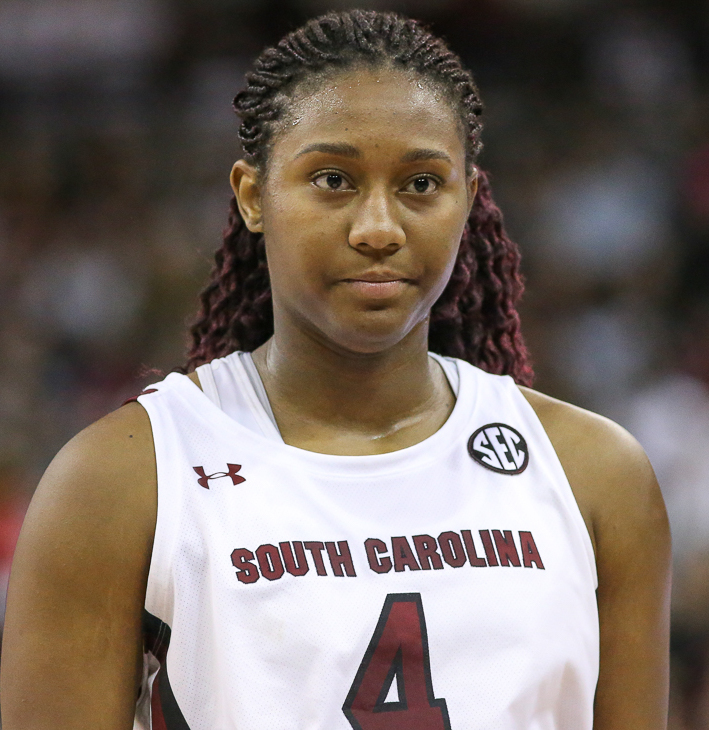
2019 Reef tournament MVP, South Carolina's Aliyah Boston

Year	Division	Champion	Runner-up	MVP	Participating Teams
2000	N/A	Texas Tech	Missouri State	Jackie Stiles, Missouri State	LSU; Missouri State; Penn State; Texas Tech
2001	Saint Thomas	Texas	USC	Stacy Stephens, Texas	Texas; USC
2001	Saint John	Arizona State	Kansas State	Amanda Levens, Arizona State	Arizona State; Kansas State
2001	Saint Croix	Florida State	Saint Mary's	Shinikki Whiting, Florida State	Florida State; Saint Mary's
2002	Saint Thomas	South Carolina	Boston College	Jocelyn Penn, South Carolina	Boston College; Oregon; South Carolina
2002	Saint John	Duke	Arkansas	Alana Beard, Duke	Arkansas; Duke; Hampton; Old Dominion
2003	Saint Thomas	Virginia Tech	Mississippi State	Carrie Mason, Virginia Tech	Indiana; Iowa State; Mississippi State; Virginia Tech
2003	Saint John	Missouri State	West Virginia	Kari Koch, Missouri State	Georgia Tech; James Madison; Missouri State; West Virginia
2004	Saint Thomas	NC State	Louisville	Tiffany Stansbury, NC State	Hampton; Louisville; NC State; Nebraska
2004	Saint John	Rutgers	Kentucky	Michelle Campbell, Rutgers	Kentucky; Oregon State; Rutgers; South Dakota State
2005	Saint Thomas	Minnesota	Virginia	Jamie Broback, Minnesota	Alabama; Minnesota; Nevada; Virginia
2005	Saint John	Tennessee	Maryland	Candace Parker, Tennessee	Gonzaga; Maryland; Michigan State; Tennessee
2006	Saint Thomas	Arizona State vs. Rutgers † † The final game of the Saint Thomas division was cancelled due to the death of a family member of one of the Arizona State players in Saint Thomas.		N/A	Arizona State; Penn State; Rutgers; Western Kentucky
2006	Saint John	Marquette	Xavier	Christina Quaye, Marquette	Auburn; Marquette; Western Michigan; Xavier
2007	Saint Thomas	Connecticut	Duke	Maya Moore, UConn	Duke; Old Dominion; Purdue; Stanford; Temple; Connecticut
2007	Saint John	Wake Forest	Texas A&M	Alex Tchangoue, Wake Forest	Indiana; Texas A&M; Wake Forest; Wichita State
2008	Reef	California	South Florida	Ashley Walker, California	California; Iowa; South Florida; Texas Tech
2008	Island	Wisconsin	Baylor	Alyssa Karel, Wisconsin	Baylor; UCF; Villanova; Wisconsin
2009	Reef	Rutgers	USC	Brittany Ray, Rutgers	Mississippi State; Rutgers; Texas; USC
2009	Island	Notre Dame	Oklahoma	Skylar Diggins, Notre Dame	Notre Dame; Oklahoma; San Diego State; South Carolina
2010	Reef	Georgetown	Tennessee	Summer Rodgers, Georgetown	Georgetown; Georgia Tech; Tennessee; Missouri
2010	Island	West Virginia	Iowa State	Liz Rapella, West Virginia	Iowa State; TCU; West Virginia; Virginia
2011	Reef	Michigan	Washington State	Courtney Boylan, Michigan	Marquette; Michigan; Prairie View A&M; Washington State
2011	Island	Alabama	Seton Hall	Ericka Russell, Alabama	Alabama; Louisiana Tech; Old Dominion; Seton Hall
2012	Reef	South Carolina	DePaul	Aleighsa Welch, South Carolina	DePaul; Florida Gulf Coast; Hampton; South Carolina
2012	Island	Connecticut	Purdue	Breanna Stewart, Connecticut	Connecticut; Marist; Purdue; Wake Forest
2013	Reef	Syracuse	Texas	Brianna Butler, Syracuse	Memphis; Syracuse; Texas; Texas A&M
2013	Island	Duke	Kansas	Tricia Liston, Duke	Central Michigan; Duke; Kansas; Xavier
2014	Reef	Kentucky	South Florida	Makayla Epps, Kentucky	Illinois; Kentucky; Oklahoma; South Florida
2014	Island	Florida Gulf Coast	Wichita State	Whitney Knight, Florida Gulf Coast	Clemson; Florida Gulf Coast; Ohio State; Wichita State
2015	Reef	Maryland	South Dakota State	Brionna Jones, Maryland	Maryland; Old Dominion; Pittsburgh; South Dakota State
2015	Island	Rutgers	Green Bay	Kahleah Copper, Rutgers	Green Bay; Rutgers; Tulane; Virginia
2016	Reef	Florida State	Michigan	Leticia Romero, Florida State	Florida State; Gonzaga; Michigan; Winthrop
2016	Island	Kansas State	UTEP	Kindred Wesemann, Kansas State	Kansas State; LSU; NC State; UTEP
2017	Reef	Syracuse	Vanderbilt	Tiana Mangakahia, Syracuse	George Washington; Syracuse; Vanderbilt; Wisconsin
2017	Island	West Virginia	Virginia Tech	Teanna Muldrow, West Virginia	Butler; Drexel; West Virginia; Virginia Tech
2018	Reef	UConn	Purdue	Napheesa Collier, UConn	Ole Miss; Purdue; St. John's; UConn
2018	Island	Kentucky	North Carolina	Rhyne Howard, Kentucky	Kentucky; North Carolina; South Florida; UCLA
2019	Reef	South Carolina	Baylor	Aliyah Boston, South Carolina	Baylor; Indiana; South Carolina; Washington State
2019	Island	Louisville	Oregon	Dana Evans, Louisville	Louisville; Oklahoma State; Oregon; UT Arlington
2020	The 2020 women's tournament was cancelled due to the COVID-19 pandemic.				
2021	Reef	Texas A&M	Northwestern	Jordan Nixon, Texas A&M	Northwestern; Pittsburgh; South Dakota; Texas A&M
2021	Island	Arizona	DePaul	Cate Reese, Arizona	Arizona; DePaul; Rutgers; Vanderbilt
2022	Reef	Arkansas	Kansas State	Makayla Daniels, Arkansas	Arkansas; Clemson; Kansas State; Northern Arizona
2022	Island	Seton Hall	Georgia	Diamond Battles, Georgia	Georgia; Seton Hall; VCU; Wisconsin
2023	Reef	Texas	Arizona State	Rori Harmon, Texas	Arizona State; High Point; South Florida; Texas
2023	Island	NC State	Colorado	River Baldwin, NC State	Cincinnati; Colorado; Kentucky; NC State
2024	Reef	Florida State	Gonzaga	Ta’Niya Latson, Florida State	Florida State; Gonzaga; Missouri State; Texas Tech
2024	Island	Kansas	Auburn	S’Mya Nichols, Kansas	Auburn; Kansas; Northern Iowa; Pittsburgh
2025	Reef	LSU	Washington State	Amiya Joyner, LSU	LSU; Marist; Miami (OH); Washington State
2025	Island	Vanderbilt	BYU	Mikayla Blakes, Vanderbilt	BYU; Oregon State; Vanderbilt; Virginia Tech
2025	Harbor	Boise State	Tulane	Tatum Thompson, Boise State	Boise State; Elon; North Dakota; Tulane
2026	Reef				Baylor; Penn State; Seton Hall; South Florida
2026	Island				Air Force; Santa Clara; Texas Tech; Xavier
2026	Harbor				Colorado State; Grambling State; Little Rock; Tennessee Tech

== Men's tournament appearances ==
Team	Appearances	Years	Tournament Record
Clemson	3	2001, 2010, 2014	6–3 (.667)
Morris Brown	1	2001	0–3 (.000)
La Salle	4	2001, 2003, 2008, 2013	4–8 (.333)
UAB	2	2001, 2024	1–2 (.333)
Eastern Michigan	2	2001, 2004	3–3 (.500)
Miami (FL)	2	2001, 2008	5–1 (.833)
Saint Bonaventure	1	2002	2–1 (.667)
Virginia Tech	1	2002	2–1 (.667)
Michigan	1	2002	0–3 (.000)
BYU	1	2002	3–0 (1.000)
Toledo	2	2002, 2006	1–5 (.167)
Kansas State	3	2002, 2018, 2024	4–2 (.667)
Monmouth	2	2003, 2007	3–3 (.500)
Appalachian State	1	2003	1–2 (.333)
Boston College	3	2003, 2009, 2022	6–3 (.667)
Wichita State	2	2003, 2007	3–3 (.500)
Hampton	2	2003, 2023	2–4 (.333)
Austin Peay	1	2004	1–2 (.333)
Saint Louis	1	2004	1–2 (.333)
Arkansas	1	2004	3–0 (1.000)
Winthrop	3	2004, 2007, 2011	4–5 (.444)
Troy	1	2004	0–3 (.000)
Old Dominion	4	2005, 2010, 2014, 2018	8–4 (.667)
Georgia	1	2005	2–1 (.667)
Fordham	3	2005, 2019, 2023	3–6 (.333)
Wisconsin	2	2005, 2008	5–1 (.833)
Norfolk State	4	2005, 2011, 2015, 2023	4–8 (.333)
Eastern Kentucky	2	2005, 2018	2–4 (.333)
Middle Tennessee State	2	2006, 2026	1–2 (.333)
Alabama	2	2006, 2010	2–4 (.333)
Iowa	3	2006, 2008, 2010	4–5 (.444)
Xavier	2	2006, 2010	5–1 (.833)
VCU	1	2006	2–1 (.667)
Charleston	2	2006, 2025	3–3 (.500)
Villanova	1	2006	1–2 (.333)
Charlotte	1	2007	1–2 (.333)
Georgia Tech	1	2007	2–1 (.667)
UIC	2	2007, 2012	2–4 (.333)
Baylor	1	2007	3–0 (1.000)
Notre Dame	1	2007	1–2 (.333)
Southern Miss	1	2008	2–1 (.667)
UConn	2	2008, 2012	5–1 (.833)
San Diego	1	2008	1–2 (.333)
Valparaiso	2	2008, 2009	1–5 (.167)
DePaul	2	2009, 2015	3–3 (.500)
Northern Iowa	3	2009, 2013, 2018	6–3 (.667)
East Carolina	2	2009, 2026	1–2 (.333)
Tennessee	1	2009	2–1 (.667)
Saint Joseph's	2	2009, 2016	2–4 (.333)
South Dakota State	1	2009	0–3 (.000)
Purdue	1	2009	3–0 (1.000)
Saint Peter's	1	2010	1–2 (.333)
Long Beach State	1	2010	2–1 (.667)
Seton Hall	2	2010, 2014	4–2 (.667)
Drexel	2	2011, 2017	2–4 (.333)
TCU	1	2011	1–2 (.333)
Virginia	1	2011	2–1 (.667)
Drake	3	2011, 2017, 2022	6–3 (.667)
Ole Miss	2	2011, 2016	4–2 (.667)
Marquette	1	2011	3–0 (1.000)
Mercer	2	2012, 2017	2–4 (.333)
George Mason	3	2012, 2020, 2022	4–5 (.444)
New Mexico	1	2012	3–0 (1.000)
Wake Forest	2	2012, 2017	2–4 (.333)
Quinnipiac	2	2012, 2017	1–5 (.167)
Iona	2	2012, 2025	2–4 (.333)
Loyola Marymount	1	2013	1–2 (.333)
Marist	1	2013	0–3 (.000)
Maryland	1	2013	3–0 (1.000)
Providence	1	2013	2–1 (.667)
Vanderbilt	1	2013	2–1 (.667)
Morgan State	1	2013	1–2 (.333)
Gardner-Webb	1	2014	1–2 (.333)
Nevada	2	2014, 2019	3–3 (.500)
LSU	1	2014	1–2 (.333)
Illinois State	3	2014, 2019, 2024	2–4 (.333)
Weber State	1	2014	1–2 (.333)
Ohio	1	2015	1–2 (.333)
Tulsa	1	2015	2–1 (.667)
Indiana State	2	2015, 2026	2–1 (.667)
Hofstra	1	2015	1–2 (.333)
Florida State	1	2015	2–1 (.667)
South Carolina	1	2015	3–0 (1.000)
Loyola-Chicago	1	2016	1–2 (.333)
Oral Roberts	1	2016	0–3 (.000)
Montana	1	2016	1–2 (.333)
NC State	1	2016	2–1 (.667)
Washington State	1	2016	1–2 (.333)
Creighton	2	2016, 2021	5–1 (.833)
Liberty	2	2017, 2024	4–2 (.667)
Houston	1	2017	2–1 (.667)
Colorado	2	2017, 2021	5–1 (.833)
Oregon State	2	2018, 2025	2–4 (.333)
Kennesaw State	1	2018	0–3 (.000)
Missouri	1	2018	2–1 (.667)
Penn	1	2018	1–2 (.333)
Grand Canyon	1	2019	1–2 (.333)
Cincinnati	1	2019	2–1 (.667)
Bowling Green	1	2019	2–1 (.667)
Western Kentucky	1	2019	2–1 (.667)
Howard	2	2020, 2022	1–5 (.167)
Belmont	2	2020, 2022	5–1 (.833)
Queens	1	2020	1–2 (.333)
Bradley	1	2021	0–3 (.000)
Colorado State	1	2021	3–0 (1.000)
Brown	1	2021	1–2 (.333)
Northeastern	1	2021	2–1 (.667)
Duquesne	1	2021	1–2 (.333)
Southern Illinois	2	2021, 2026	1–2 (.333)
Buffalo	1	2022	1–2 (.333)
Wyoming	1	2022	1–2 (.333)
Tarleton State	1	2022	2–1 (.667)
Abilene Christian	1	2023	2–1 (.667)
San Jose State	1	2023	2–1 (.667)
Kent State	1	2023	2–1 (.667)
Missouri State	1	2023	3–0 (1.000)
Florida Gulf Coast	1	2023	0–3 (.000)
Longwood	1	2024	1–2 (.333)
McNeese State	1	2024	2–1 (.667)
Louisiana	1	2024	0–3 (.000)
George Washington	1	2024	2–1 (.667)
Yale	1	2025	3–0 (1.000)
Akron	1	2025	2–1 (.667)
Evansville	1	2025	1–2 (.333)
Green Bay	1	2025	2–1 (.667)
UMass	1	2025	1–2 (.333)
Stephen F. Austin	1	2026	
Temple	1	2026	
UT Martin	1	2026	
Utah Valley	1	2026	

== Women's tournament appearances ==
Team	Appearances	Years	Tournament Record
LSU	2	2000, 2016	2–3 (.667)
Missouri State	3	2000, 2003, 2024	4–4 (.500)
Penn State	3	2000, 2006, 2026	1–3 (.250)
Texas Tech	4	2000, 2008, 2024, 2026	4–4 (.500)
Texas	4	2001, 2009, 2013, 2023	9–2 (.818)
USC	2	2001, 2009	2–3 (.667)
Arizona State	3	2001, 2006, 2023	5–2 (.714)
Kansas State	3	2001, 2016, 2022	7–2 (.778)
Florida State	3	2001, 2016, 2024	8–0 (1.000)
Saint Mary's	1	2001	1–1 (.500)
Florida	1	2001	0–2 (.000)
Wisconsin	4	2001, 2008, 2017, 2022	4–7 (.364)
Richmond	1	2001	1–2 (.333)
Western Michigan	2	2001, 2006	1–4 (.200)
Dayton	1	2001	0–2 (.000)
Boston College	1	2002	1–1 (.500)
Oregon	2	2002, 2019	2–1 (.667)
South Carolina	4	2002, 2009, 2012, 2019	8–3 (.727)
Arkansas	2	2002, 2022	4–2 (.667)
Duke	3	2002, 2007, 2013	8–1 (.889)
Hampton	3	2002, 2004, 2012	0–8 (.000)
Old Dominion	4	2002, 2007, 2011, 2015	4–8 (.333)
Virginia Tech	3	2003, 2017, 2025	5–2 (.714)
Iowa State	2	2003, 2010	3–2 (.600)
Mississippi State	2	2003, 2009	2–3 (.667)
Indiana	3	2003, 2007, 2019	3–5 (.375)
West Virginia	3	2003, 2010, 2017	8–1 (.889)
Georgia Tech	2	2003, 2010	4–2 (.667)
James Madison	1	2003	0–3 (.000)
Louisville	2	2004, 2019	4–1 (.800)
NC State	3	2004, 2016, 2023	5–3 (.625)
Nebraska	1	2004	1–1 (.500)
Rutgers	5	2004, 2006, 2009, 2015, 2021	9–4 (.692)
Kentucky	4	2004, 2014, 2018, 2023	7–5 (.583)
South Dakota State	2	2004, 2015	2–4 (.333)
Oregon State	2	2004, 2025	1–4 (.200)
Nevada	1	2005	0–2 (.000)
Minnesota	1	2005	2–0 (1.000)
Alabama	2	2005, 2011	3–2 (.600)
Virginia	3	2005, 2010, 2015	3–5 (.375)
Michigan State	1	2005	2–1 (.667)
Tennessee	2	2005, 2010	4–2 (.667)
Gonzaga	3	2005, 2016, 2024	1–8 (.111)
Maryland	2	2005, 2015	5–1 (.833)
Western Kentucky	1	2006	1–1 (.500)
Marquette	2	2006, 2011	4–2 (.667)
Auburn	2	2006, 2024	2–3 (.400)
Xavier	3	2006, 2013, 2026	2–4 (.333)
Purdue	3	2007, 2012, 2018	3–6 (.333)
Temple	1	2007	1–2 (.333)
UConn	3	2007, 2012, 2018	9–0 (1.000)
Stanford	1	2007	2–1 (.667)
Wake Forrest	2	2007, 2012	3–3 (.500)
Texas A&M	3	2007, 2013, 2021	6–3 (.667)
Wichita State	2	2007, 2014	2–4 (.333)
Villanova	1	2008	1–2 (.333)
Baylor	3	2008, 2019, 2026	5–1 (.833)
UCF	1	2008	0–3 (.000)
Iowa	1	2008	1–2 (.333)
California	1	2008	3–0 (1.000)
South Florida	5	2008, 2014, 2018, 2023, 2026	6–6 (.500)
Oklahoma	2	2009, 2014	3–3 (.500)
Notre Dame	1	2009	3–0 (1.000)
San Diego State	1	2009	0–3 (.000)
Georgetown	1	2010	2–1 (.667)
Missouri	1	2010	1–2 (.333)
TCU	1	2010	0–3 (.000)
Seton Hall	3	2011, 2022, 2026	4–2 (.667)
Louisiana Tech	1	2011	1–2 (.333)
Michigan	2	2011, 2016	5–1 (.833)
Washington State	2	2011, 2019	2–4 (.333)
Prairie View A&M	1	2011	0–3 (.000)
DePaul	2	2012, 2021	4–2 (.667)
Florida Gulf Coast	2	2012, 2014	3–3 (.500)
Marist	1	2012	1–2 (.333)
Kansas	2	2013, 2024	4–2 (.667)
Central Michigan	1	2013	1–2 (.333)
Memphis	1	2013	0–3 (.000)
Syracuse	2	2013, 2017	5–1 (.833)
Clemson	2	2014, 2022	1–5 (1.67)
Ohio State	1	2014	2–1 (.667)
Illinois	1	2014	1–2 (.333)
Tulane	2	2015, 2025	2–3 (.400)
Green Bay	1	2015	1–2 (.333)
Pittsburgh	3	2015, 2021, 2024	2–7 (.222)
UTEP	1	2016	0–3 (.000)
Winthrop	1	2016	0–3 (.000)
Butler	1	2017	1–2 (.333)
Drexel	1	2017	1–2 (.333)
Vanderbilt	3	2017, 2021, 2025	5–3 (.625)
George Washington	1	2017	2–1 (.667)
North Carolina	1	2018	2–1 (.667)
UCLA	1	2018	0–3 (.000)
Ole Miss	1	2018	0–3 (.000)
St. John's	1	2018	2–1 (.667)
UT Arlington	1	2019	0–3 (.000)
Oklahoma State	1	2019	1–2 (.333)
Arizona	1	2021	3–0 (1.000)
South Dakota	1	2021	1–2 (.333)
Northwestern	1	2021	2–1 (.667)
VCU	1	2022	2–1 (.667)
Georgia	1	2022	2–1 (.667)
Northern Arizona	1	2022	0–3 (.000)
Cincinnati	1	2023	2–1 (.667)
Colorado	1	2023	2–1 (.667)
High Point	1	2023	0–3 (.000)
Northern Iowa	1	2024	1–2 (.333)
Elon	1	2025	1–1 (.500)
North Dakota	1	2025	0–2 (.000)
Boise State	1	2025	2–0 (1.000)
BYU	1	2025	1–1 (.500)
Miami (OH)	1	2025	1–1 (.500)
Air Force	1	2026	
Colorado State	1	2026	
Grambling State	1	2026	
Little Rock	1	2026	
Santa Clara	1	2026	
Tennessee Tech	1	2026	

== Tournaments held outside of the Virgin Islands ==
=== 2017 ===
The 2017 men's and women's tournaments were moved to the U.S. mainland due to heavy damage caused by Hurricanes Irma and Maria. The tournament organizers decided to solicit hosting bids from all participating teams in both tournaments, with each tournament intended to be hosted by a participating school. The substitute venue for the 2017 men's tournament was Vines Center at Liberty University in Lynchburg, Virginia. The 2017 women's tournament took place in two different venues, with the Reef division playing at the Charles E. Smith Center on the campus of George Washington University in Washington, D.C., and the Island division at the neutral Titan Field House at Eastern Florida State College in Melbourne, Florida, presumably after no school in the Island division submitted a bid. The tournament moved back to the Virgin Islands in 2018.

=== 2020 ===
Due to the COVID-19 pandemic, the 2020 men's tournament was relocated to Washington, D.C., as travel restrictions prevented the tournament from being held in the U.S. Virgin Islands as normal. The tournament took place November 26–28, 2020 at the Walter E. Washington Convention Center in Washington, D.C. The tournament was condensed from the typical eight teams to just four teams — Belmont, George Mason, Howard, and Queens (N.C.). Belmont went undefeated, beating the three other teams to win the 2020 men's tournament. The 2020 women's tournament was cancelled.
