= 2007 Paradise Jam =

- Season: 2007–08
- Teams: 8 (men's), 10 (women's)
- Finals site: Sports and Fitness Center, Saint Thomas, U.S. Virgin Islands
- Champions: Baylor (men's); UConn (women's Saint Thomas); Wake Forest (women's Saint John)
- MVP: Curtis Jerrells, Baylor (men's); Maya Moore, UConn (women's Saint Thomas); Alex Tchangoue, Wake Forest (women's Saint John)

The 2007 Paradise Jam was an early-season men's and women's college basketball tournament. The tournament, which began in 2000, was part of the 2007–08 NCAA Division I men's basketball season and 2007–08 NCAA Division I women's basketball season. The tournament was played at the Sports and Fitness Center in Saint Thomas, U.S. Virgin Islands. Baylor won the men's tournament, in the women's tournament UConn won the Saint Thomas Division, and Wake Forest won the Saint John Division.

== Men's tournament ==
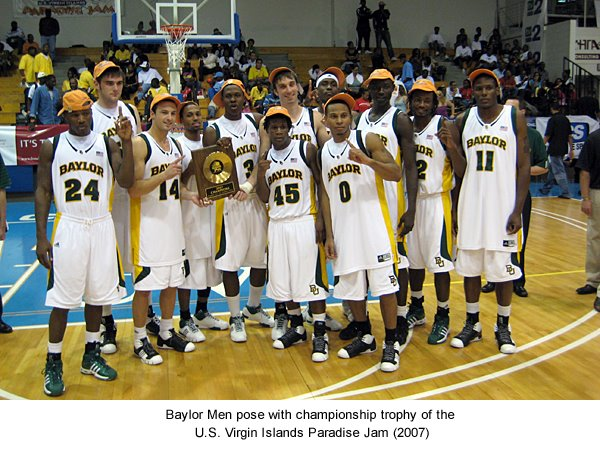
Baylor Team Photo 2007 Paradise Jam winners

=== Bracket ===
5th Place Game; November 19
Charlotte	56
Monmouth	58
7th Place Game
UIC	60
Wichita State	67

Consolation 2nd Round; November 18
Charlotte	64
UIC	63
Wichita State	50
Monmouth	59

First Round; November 16
Charlotte	77
Georgia Tech	82
UIC	58
Winthrop	72
Baylor	64
Wichita State	55
Monmouth	33
Villanova	76

Semifinals; November 18
10	Georgia Tech	73
Winthrop	79
Baylor	68
Notre Dame	64

Championship; November 19
Winthrop	54
Baylor	62
3rd Place Game
Georgia Tech	70
Notre Dame	69

== Women's tournament ==
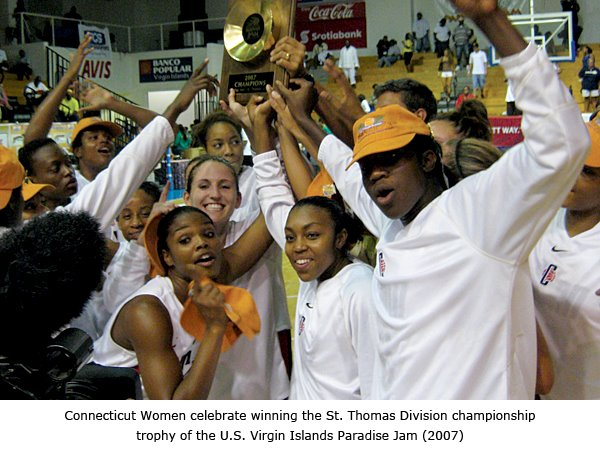
Connecticut team photo - 2007 Paradise Jam Tournament winners

The 2007 edition of the tournament consisted of one division with four teams, and another division with six teams. The Saint Thomas Division was organized into two sub-divisions, Reef and Island. The three teams in the sub-divisions played each other in a round robin, results of the games were used to determine sees for the championship round games on November 25. The Saint John division, with four teams, played a round robin, with each team playing each other November 22-24.

=== Saint Thomas Division ===
==== Reef Sub-Division ====
In the opening rounds, Duke beat Purdue and Temple to go 2–0 in the Reef division, The Duke-Purdue match up also featured two top 25 teams with Duke ranked 8th and Purdue 20th. Duke held Purdue to 29% shooting and won the game 53–41.

November 22
Duke	53
Purdue	41

November 23
Temple	53
Duke	64

November 24
Purdue	47
Temple	61

==== Island Sub-Division ====
In the Island Sub-Division UConn defeated Stanford and Old Dominion to go 2–0 in the Island division. The match up between Stanford and Connecticut involved two of the top teams in the nation, with Stanford ranked 4th and UConn 2nd. The Huskies started out strong, opening up a 22–8 lead and went on to win 66–54. Freshman Maya Moore was the leading scorer with 19 points.

November 22
UConn	66
Stanford	54

November 23
UConn	86
Old Dominion	43

November 24
Stanford	69
Old Dominion	61

===== Saint Thomas Division Championship Round =====
The Championship game matched up the two 2–0 teams, Duke and Connecticut. UConn pulled out to a 16-point lead by halftime, and extended the lead by another ten points in the second half. The Huskies ended up winning 74-48. This was the first meeting between the two schools since the prior year, when Duke won in overtime in the regional final to deny UConn a trip to the Final Four.

November 25; Saint Thomas Division Championship
Duke	48
UConn	74

November 25; Saint Thomas Division 3rd Place Game
Purdue	53
Old Dominion	66

November 25; Saint Thomas Division 5th Place Game
Stanford	64
Temple	53

=== Saint John Division ===
November 22
Wake Forest	55
Indiana	53

November 22
Texas A&M	70
Wichita State	36

November 23
Indiana	64
Wichita State	54

November 23
Wake Forest	63
Texas A&M	56

November 24
Texas A&M	60
Indiana	48

November 24
Wichita State	47
Wake Forest	54
