= 2020 Paradise Jam =

- Season: 2020–21
- Teams: 4
- Finals site: Walter E. Washington Convention Center, Washington, D.C.
- Champions: Belmont (men's)
- MVP: Luke Smith, Belmont

The 2020 Paradise Jam was an early-season men's and women's college basketball tournament. The tournament, which began in 2000, was part of the 2020–21 NCAA Division I men's basketball season was held November 26–28. The tournaments are normally held at Saint Thomas, Virgin Islands at the Sports and Fitness Center on the campus of the University of the Virgin Islands. Due to the COVID-19 pandemic, the men's tournament was played at the Walter E. Washington Convention Center in Washington, D.C. The 2020 women's edition of the women's tournament was cancelled due to the COVID-19 pandemic.

== Men's tournament ==
\

=== Bracket ===
November 26
Howard	78
Belmont	95

November 26
Queens	65
George Mason	66

November 27
Belmont	77
George Mason	67

November 27
Howard	71
Queens	85

November 28
Belmont	73
Queens	61

November 28
George Mason	84
Howard	70
