= 2011 Paradise Jam =

- Season: 2011–12
- Teams: 8
- Finals site: Sports and Fitness Center, Saint Thomas, U.S. Virgin Islands
- Champions: Marquette (men's); Alabama (women's Island); Michigan (women's Reef)
- MVP: Darius Johnson-Odom, Marquette (men's); Ericka Russell, Alabama (women's Island); Courtney Boylan, Michigan(women's Reef)

The 2011 Paradise Jam was an early-season men's and women's college basketball tournament. The tournament, which began in 2000, was part of the 2011–12 NCAA Division I men's basketball season and 2011–12 NCAA Division I women's basketball season. The tournament was played at the Sports and Fitness Center in Saint Thomas, U.S. Virgin Islands, Marquette won the men's tournament, in the women's tournament Alabama won the women's Island Division and Michigan won the women's Reef Division.

== Men's tournament ==
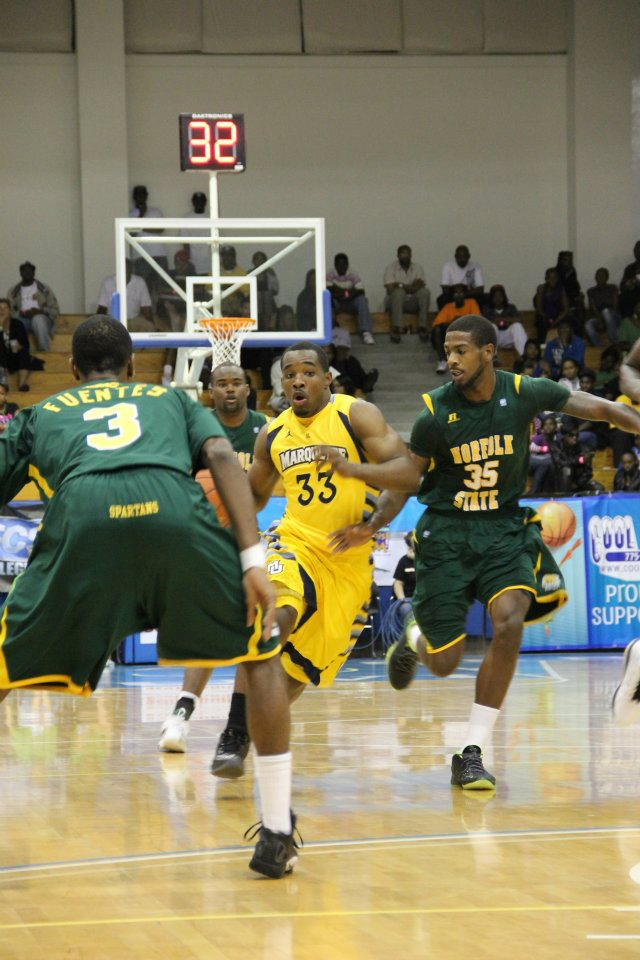
Marquette's Derrick Wilson drives against Norfolk State's Jamel Fuentes while Rashid Gaston trails at the 2011 Paradise Jam Tournament

Marquette had an easy path to the final game, then were tested. In the opening round, Marquette beat Winthrop easily 95–73, while Norfolk State beat Drexel by five points, 61–56. In the semifinals, Marquette again won easily, beating Ole Miss 96–66, while Norfolk State beat TCU 66–53 to set up the final. Marquette had played Norfolk State just a week earlier in Milwaukee, in a game that was never in doubt. Marquette opened up a 6–0 lead, expanded the lead to eleven by halftime, then scored 59 points in the second half to win 99–68.

When the two teams met in the Paradise Jam final, the game started out similarly to the early game, with Marquette never trailing, and reaching a nine-point lead at halftime. However, instead of scoring 59 points in the second half, they would score only 59 points in the game. The Golden Eagles, ranked 16th in the AP poll, held a 14-point lead at one time, but the Spartans had two 7–0 runs and tied up the game at 57 points apiece with just over two minutes left. Marquette scored to take a lead; Norfolk State had a chance to tie in the closing seconds but failed to hit the basket, and Marquette won the 2011 Paradise Jam 59–57.

=== Bracket ===
5th Place Game; November 21
Virginia	60
Drake	52
7th Place Game
Drexel	68
Winthrop	45

Consolation 2nd Round; November 20
Drexel	35
Virginia	49
Drake	66
Winthrop	62

First Round; November 18
Norfolk State	61
Drexel	56
TCU	57
Virginia	55
Drake	59
Ole Miss	63
Winthrop	71
21	Marquette	91

Semifinals; November 20
Norfolk State	66
TCU	53
Ole Miss	66
21	Marquette	96

Championship; November 21
Norfolk State	57
16	Marquette	59
3rd Place Game
TCU	69
Ole Miss	80

== Women's tournament ==
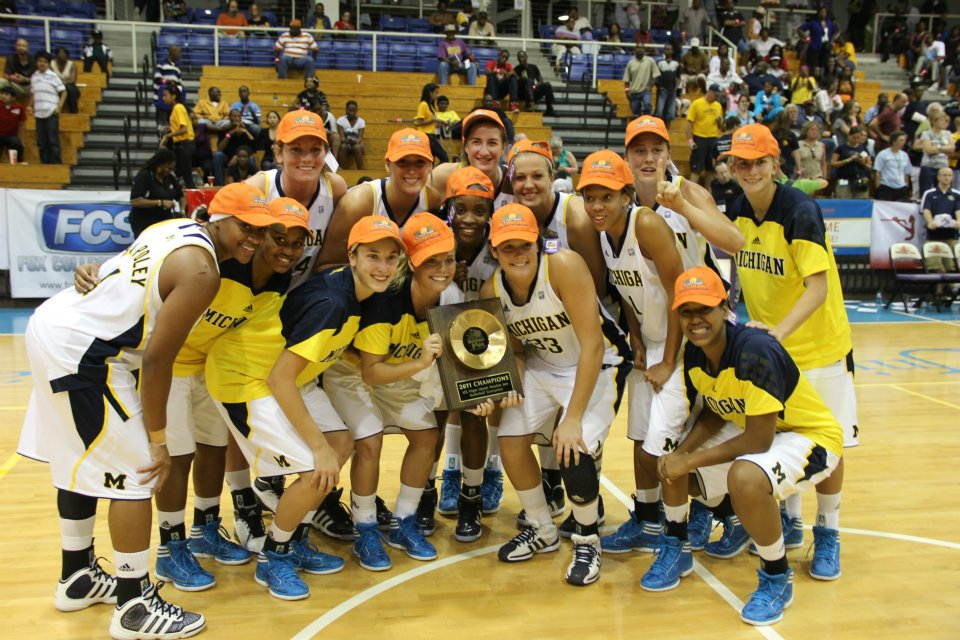
Michigan women's basketball team with championship trophy at the 2011 Paradise Jam Tournament

The woman's tournament is organized as two divisions of four teams, each playing each other in a round-robin format.

=== Participating teams ===
Island Division

- Alabama
- Seton Hall
- Louisiana Tech
- Old Dominion

Reef Division

- Michigan
- Washington State
- Marquette
- Prairie View A&M

=== Overview ===
==== Island Division ====
Alabama and Seton Hall ended with records of 2–1. Alabama won the division by beating Seton Hall in their match up. Alabama's Ericka Russell of Alabama was named Island MVP.

==== Reef Division ====
Michigan won all three of their games to capture the (Reef Division) championship. Courtney Boylan of Michigan was named Reef MVP.
