= 2004 Paradise Jam =

- Season: 2004–05
- Teams: 6 (men's), 8 (women's)
- Finals site: Sports and Fitness Center, Saint Thomas, U.S. Virgin Islands
- Champions: Arkansas (men's); NC State (women's Saint Thomas); Rutgers (women's Saint John)
- MVP: Ronnie Brewer, Arkansas (men's); Tiffany Stansbury, NC State (women's Saint Thomas); Michelle Campbell, Rutgers (women's Saint John)

The 2004 Paradise Jam was an early-season men's and women's college basketball tournament. The tournament, which began in 2000, was part of the 2004–05 NCAA Division I men's basketball season and 2004–05 NCAA Division I women's basketball season. The tournament was played at the Sports and Fitness Center in Saint Thomas, U.S. Virgin Islands. Arkansas won the men's tournament, in the women's tournament NC State won the Saint Thomas division, and Rutgers won the Saint John Division.

== Men's tournament ==
Teams were arranged into two divisions consisting of three teams each. The three teams faced each other in a round-robin format over the first three days. In the Championship round teams were seeded based on record and played in the fifth place game, third place game and championship game.

=== Saint Thomas division ===
In the first round, Winthrop faced Arkansas. The game was close at halftime, with Arkansas holding a three-point margin. In the second half, the Razorbacks out scored Winthrop by 20 to win the game 72–49. Arkansas hit 11 of their 17 three point attempt for a shooting percentage of 65%.

In the second round, Winthrop faced Troy. Winthrop held a three-point lead at halftime, and extended the lead in the second half to win 89–80.

In the third round, Arkansas faced Troy. Arkansas pulled out to a seven-point lead in the first half, and outscored Troy by 28 in the second half, to win the game 89–54.

November 19
Arkansas	72
Winthrop	49

November 20
Troy	89
Winthrop	80

November 21
Arkansas	89
Troy	54

=== Saint John division ===
In the first round, Austin Peay faced Saint Louis. The Governors led most of the way, but Saint Louis took a lead in the final two minutes. The Billikens were up by three in the closing seconds, but Austin Peay's Maurice Hampton hit a three-pointer with two seconds left to send the game into overtime. Austin Peay outscored Saint Louis 8–1 in overtime to win 52–45.

In the second round, Austin Peay faced Eastern Michigan. Although the score was close at halftime, with Eastern Michigan holding only a two-point lead, the margin widened in the second half, and Eastern Michigan won by 14, 73–59.

In the third round, Saint Louis faced Eastern Michigan. Saint Louis led early, with a five-point halftime lead, but the Eagles outscored the Billikens in the second half by eight, and won 61–58.

November 19
Austin Peay	52*
Saint Louis	45

November 20
Austin Peay	73
Eastern Michigan	59

November 21
Saint Louis	61
Eastern Michigan	58

=== Championship round ===
In the fifth place game, Saint Louis faced Troy. The game was tied at 32 points each at halftime, but the Billikens outscored Troy by eight in the second half to win the game, 63–55.

Winthrop played Austin Peay in the third place game. Winthrop built a nine-point lead in the first half, then opened the second half with a 15–4 run, and won the game, 52–36.

In the Championship game, Arkansas squared off against Eastern Michigan. Arkansas built a 17-point lead in the first half. While Eastern Michigan played the Razorbacks almost even in the second half, they were unable to close the gap, and Arkansas won the Paradise Jam 82–63. Ronnie Brewer (Arkansas) was selected as Tournament MVP.

November 22; Fifth Place game
Troy	55
Saint Louis	63

November 22; Third Place game
Winthrop	52
Austin Peay	36

November 22; Championship
Arkansas	82
Eastern Michigan	63

== Women's tournament ==
Teams in the Saint Thomas division played in a 4 team tournament with a 3rd place game. Teams in the Saint John's division played a round-robin with a pair of games on the 26th; on the 27th the winners played each other and the losers played each other. The teams in the Saint John division played a round-robin, with one game each on the 25th, 26th and 27 November.

=== Saint Thomas Division ===
Louisville faced Hampton in the opening round. The Lady Pirates started out strong and led 31–23 at halftime. Louisville erased the eight point deficit and added six more to end up with the win 63–55.

NC State faced Nebraska in the other game. NC State started by scoring the first eight points, but the game was largely even for the rest of the half as the Wolfpack led by seven, 26–19 at halftime. The Huskers went on a 9–2 run to start the second half and tie the game, and then took the lead but NC State responded and took the lead back. NC State went on a 19–4 run over seven minute stretch to help assure the victory. The final score was 55–45.

The next day, Kiera Hardy scored 31 points, a career-high, to help Nebraska defeat Hampton 72–54. The victory was Connie Yori's 200th NCAA Division I victory.

In the championship game, NC State scored the game's first six points but after timeout by Louisville the Cardinals responded with six points of their own. The game remained tied for three minutes until NC State's Kendra Bell scored two of the lead back to NC State. Louisville responded and let at the half 26 – 21. In the second half, NC State hit 50% of their shot attempts to take back the lead. Louisville had a three-pointer with less than a minute to go in the game and cut the lead to two points. The team was forced to foul, and the Wolfpack hit free throws to win the game and the championship of the division, 54–49.

NC State's Tiffany Stansbury earned the division MVP award. The other members of the All-Star team included Marquetta Dickens (NC State), Jazz Covington (Louisville), Missy Taylor (Louisville), Rachael Butler (Hampton), and Kiera Hardy (Nebraska).

==== Bracket ====
Semifinals; November 26
Louisville	63
Hampton	55
NC State	55
Nebraska	45

Championship; November 27
Louisville	49
NC State	54
Consolation; November 27
Hampton	54
Nebraska	72

=== Saint Thomas Division ===
On Thanksgiving Day, Rutgers took on South Dakota State. The Scarlet Knights had an early lead but let the Jackrabbits tied up the game late in the first half. Rutgers broke the tie and ended the half with a 29–26 lead. Rutgers used their full-court press to create some turnovers and score in transition in the second half, but South Dakota State remained close, only three points behind early in the second half. Rutgers then scored seven consecutive points and gradually grew their lead. Matee Ajavon hit 13 of her 19 shot attempts for the Scarlet Knights which led by 29 points. The defense held the Jackrabbits to under 30% shooting from the field. Rutgers ended up with the win 68–50.

Kentucky faced Oregon State in the other Thanksgiving Day game. The Beavers were in control early on and led by 14 points at halftime. In the second half, Sarah Potts of Kentucky scored 19 of her 27 points. Her teammate Jennifer Humphrey recorded a double double with 12 points and 11 rebounds in the two of them helped lead the Wildcats to overcome the deficit and pull out a 73–70 victory.

On the day two of the event, Rutgers took on Oregon State. The Scarlet Knights had a small six point lead at halftime but open the second half with their "55" press which led to a 25–4 run, and put the game out of reach. Chelsea Newton made six of her eight field-goal attempts in the first half, scoring a team-high 16 points in the first half. The Scarlet Knights ended up beating Oregon State 77–53.

In the game between Kentucky and South Dakota State, the Wildcats held a small four-point lead at halftime, but the Jackrabbits responded in the second half and ended up with the two point win 57–55.

On the final day, Oregon State took on South Dakota State. The Beavers outscored the Jackrabbits by 13 points in the first half. The Jackrabbits outscored the Beavers in the second half by 10 but that was not enough and Oregon State finished with a 68–65 win.

In the Championship game between Kentucky and #18 Rutgers; The Scarlet Knights opened up strong, scoring the first 10 points, and ended the first half with a 20 point lead 41–21. Although the Wildcats outscored the Scarlet Knights by five points in the second half, the first half margin was too much to overcome and Rutgers ended up winning the game 75–60.

Michelle Campbell (Rutgers) named division MVP. The remaining all-stars were Chelsea Newton (Rutgers), Matee Ajavon (Rutgers), Sara Potts (Kentucky), Shannon Howell (Oregon State), and Shannon Schlagel (South Dakota State).

November 28
Rutgers	68
South Dakota State	50

November 28
Kentucky	73
Oregon State	70

November 29
Oregon State	53
Rutgers	77

November 29
Kentucky	57
South Dakota State	55

November 30
Oregon State	68
South Dakota State	65

November 30
Kentucky	75
Rutgers	60
