= 2022 Paradise Jam =

- Season: 2022–23
- Teams: 8
- Finals site: Sports and Fitness Center, Saint Thomas, U.S. Virgin Islands
- Champions: Drake (men's); Georgia (women's Island); Arkansas (women's Reef)
- MVP: Tucker DeVries, Drake (men's); Diamond Battles, Georgia (women's Island); Makayla Daniels, Arkansas (women's Reef)

The 2022 Paradise Jam is an early-season men's and women's college basketball tournament. The tournament, which began in 2000, is part of the 2022–23 NCAA Division I men's basketball season and 2022–23 NCAA Division I women's basketball season. The tournament was played at the Sports and Fitness Center in Saint Thomas, U.S. Virgin Islands. Drake won the men's tournament, in the women's tournament Georgia won the Island Division, and Arkansas won the Reef Division.

== Men's tournament ==
=== Bracket ===
5th Place Game; November 21
Howard | 73
Belmont | 96
7th Place Game
Buffalo | 82
George Mason | 74

Consolation 2nd Round; November 19
Buffalo | 59
Howard | 63
Belmont | 66
George Mason | 62

First Round; November 18
Buffalo | 72
Drake | 80
Howard | 71
Wyoming | 78
Tarleton State | 89
Belmont | 81
Boston College | 71
George Mason | 56

Semifinals; November 20
Drake | 61
Wyoming | 56
Tarleton State | 70
Boston College | 54

Championship; November 21
Drake | 71
Tarleton State | 64
3rd Place Game
Wyoming | 48
Boston College | 59

== Women's Tournament ==
=== Island Division ===
| November 24 |
| Wisconsin | 60 |
| Georgia | 68 |

| November 24 |
| VCU | 62 |
| Seton Hall | 61 |

| November 25 |
| Seton Hall | 83 |
| Wisconsin | 72 |

| November 25 |
| Georgia | 68 |
| VCU | 54 |

| November 26 |
| VCU | 75 |
| Wisconsin | 67 |

| November 26 |
| Seton Hall | 86 |
| Georgia | 80 |

=== Reef Division ===
| November 24 |
| Northern Arizona | 73 |
| Arkansas | 82 |

| November 24 |
| | Clemson | 38 |
| 25 | Kansas State | 77 |

| November 25 |
| 25 | Kansas State | 93 |
| | Northern Arizona | 80 |

| November 25 |
| Arkansas | 76 |
| Clemson | 62 |

| November 26 |
| Clemson | 80 |
| Northern Arizona | 62 |

| November 27 |
| 25 | Kansas State | 53 |
| | Arkansas | 69 |
