= Brianna Butler =

American basketball player

Personal information
- Born: February 13, 1994 (age 32) King of Prussia, Pennsylvania, U.S.
- Listed height: 5 ft 11 in (1.80 m)

Career information
- High school: Nazareth (Brooklyn, New York)
- College: Syracuse (2012–2016)
- WNBA draft: 2016: 2nd round, 23rd overall pick
- Drafted by: Los Angeles Sparks
- Playing career: 2016–2019
- Position: Guard

Career history
- 2016: Elitzur Holon
- 2016–2017: Perth Lynx
- 2017–2018: CD Zamarat
- 2018–2019: Tuenti Movil Estudiantes

Career highlights
- Big East All-Freshman Team (2013); McDonald's All-American (2012)
- Stats at Basketball Reference

Brianna Butler (born February 13, 1994) is an American former professional basketball player.

== College ==
Butler played college basketball at Syracuse University in Syracuse, New York for the Orange. During her time at Syracuse, Butler started in all 135 games played for the Orange. Holds the Syracuse record in three-pointers, with 373 made. She was also named to the All-ACC Second Team once and the All-ACC Academic Team twice.

=== Syracuse statistics ===
Legend
| GP | Games played | GS | Games started | MPG | Minutes per game |
| FG% | Field goal percentage | 3P% | 3-point field goal percentage | FT% | Free throw percentage |
| RPG | Rebounds per game | APG | Assists per game | SPG | Steals per game |
| BPG | Blocks per game | PPG | Points per game | **Bold** | Career high |

| Year | Team | GP | Points | FG% | 3P% | FT% | RPG | APG | SPG | BPG | PPG |
|---|---|---|---|---|---|---|---|---|---|---|---|
| 2012-13 | Syracuse | 32 | 230 | 32.5% | 30.5% | 71.4% | 2.7 | 1.3 | 1.3 | 0.1 | 7.2 |
| 2013-14 | Syracuse | 33 | 480 | **35.5%** | **34.4%** | 80.6% | **3.8** | **2.5** | **1.7** | **0.4** | **14.5** |
| 2014-15 | Syracuse | 32 | 427 | 30.0% | 28.2% | **85.7%** | 3.4 | 1.6 | 1.5 | 0.3 | 13.3 |
| 2015-16 | Syracuse | **38** | **503** | 31.4% | 31.1% | 76.9% | 3.8 | 1.5 | 1.6 | 0.2 | 13.2 |
| Career | | 135 | 1640 | 32.3% | 31.0% | 79.9% | 3.4 | 1.7 | 1.5 | 0.3 | 12.1 |

== Professional career ==
In 2016, Butler became only the third player out of Syracuse to be taken in the WNBA draft, when she was picked by the Los Angeles Sparks. However, she was eventually cut from the roster.

Butler began the 2016–17 season in Israel with Elitzur Holon before joining the Perth Lynx of the Women's National Basketball League (WNBL) in Australia in November 2016.

Butler moved to Spain in 2017, where she played the 2017–18 season with CD Zamarat and the 2018–19 season with Tuenti Movil Estudiantes.
