= 2016 Paradise Jam =

- Season: 2016–17
- Teams: 8
- Finals site: Sports and Fitness Center, Saint Thomas, U.S. Virgin Islands
- Champions: Creighton (men's); Kansas State (women's Island); Florida State (women's Reef)
- MVP: Marcus Foster, Creighton (men's); Leticia Romero, Kansas State (women's Island); Kindred Wesemann, Kansas State (women's Reef)

The 2016 Paradise Jam was an early-season men's and women's college basketball tournament. The tournament, which began in 2000, was part of the 2016–17 NCAA Division I men's basketball season and 2016–17 NCAA Division I women's basketball season. The tournament was played at the Sports and Fitness Center in Saint Thomas, U.S. Virgin Islands, Creighton won the men's tournament by defeating Ole Miss., in the women's tournament Florida State defeated Michigan to win the Reef division, and Kansas State defeated UTEP to win the Island division.

== Men's tournament ==
=== Bracket ===
5th Place Game; November 21
Loyola–Chicago	88
Washington State	79
7th Place Game
Oral Roberts	47
Montana	68

Consolation 2nd Round; November 20
Loyola–Chicago	78
Oral Roberts	53
Montana	63
Washington State	87

First Round; November 18
Loyola–Chicago	57
Saint Joseph's	71
Oral Roberts	88
Ole Miss	95
Montana	72
NC State	85
Washington State	77
22	Creighton	103

Semifinals; November 20
Saint Joseph's	68
Ole Miss	81
NC State	94
22	Creighton	112

Championship; November 21
Ole Miss	77
12	Creighton	86
3rd Place Game
Saint Joseph's	63
NC State	73

== Women's tournament ==
The women's tournament will be played from November 24–26. The women's tournament consists of 8 teams split into two 4-team, round-robin divisions: Island and Reef.

=== Island Division ===
Kansas State and NC State were undefeated when they met in the first round. Kansas State opened up a seven-point lead by the end of the first quarter and expanded the lead over the course of the game, including an 11–0 run in the fourth quarter ending up with an 67–50 win. Although the Wildcats did not shoot well, their defense held the Wolfpack to 26% shooting. Kindred Wesemann of Kansas State hit four of seven three-pointers and scored 17 points to lead all scorers.

LSU missed their first five shots which allowed UTEP to take a 4–0 early lead. The Tigers tied the game at six and then went on a 13–0 run to take a large lead they would never give up. Chloe Jackson recorded a double double for LSU with 14 points and 10 rebounds, while Shanice Norton scored 15 points to help LSU to a 78–45 win.

Kansas State faced LSU in the second-round game. The game was close early on the Wildcats holding onto a two-point lead at halftime, but Kansas State outscored the Tigers 19–8 in the third quarter to open up the lead to double digits. The two teams played roughly evenly in the fourth quarter leading to a 69–54 Kansas State victory extending their record to 5–0. KSU's Kindred Wesemann scored 24 points, which included five three-pointers.

UTEP led NC State by two points at the end of the first quarter, and led by as many as five points before the Wolfpack closed the half on a 16–3 run to take in a one-point lead at halftime. NC State extended the lead to double digits, with UTEP briefly cutting the lead down to nine, but NC State restored the large lead and ended up with an 71–55 win. UTEP had a higher field-goal percentage, a higher three-point percentage and a higher free-throw percentage, but 24 turnovers versus only 12 for the Wolfpack gave NC State many more scoring opportunities.

On the final day LSU took on NC State. After multiple lead changes early, LSU took the lead in the second quarter and led until the final seconds. With 12 seconds left in the game, Raigyne Moncrief made a layup to cut the lead to a single point. NC State was fouled and made one of two free throws to push the lead back to two. With six seconds left in the game, Moncrief raced up court, with her coach, Nikki Fargas, yelling at her and only needing a two-pointer, she pulled up at the three-point arc and hit a three-pointer only the second made three-pointer in her career, to win the game 59–58. LSU finished second in the division.

Kansas State faced UTEP. The game was never close, with the Wildcats opening up a double-digit lead midway through the first quarter, and maintaining and extending the lead throughout the game. The Wildcats defeated UTEP 61–40.

Kindred Wesemann of Kansas State earned MVP honors for the Island division, averaging 20 points per game during the tournament. K-State's Breanna Lewis, LSU's Chloe Jackson and Raigyne Moncrief, and NC State's Jennifer Mathurin were also named to the Island division all tournament team.

November 24
Kansas State	67
NC State	50

November 24
LSU	78
UTEP	45

November 25
LSU	54
Kansas State	69

November 25
NC State	71
UTEP	55

November 26
NC State	58
LSU	59

November 26
Kansas State	61
UTEP	40

=== Reef Division ===
Michigan took on Number 25 ranked Gonzaga, with both teams undefeated heading into the game, Michigan opened up a lead early and held onto lead throughout the game although Gonzaga closed the gap to four points. Michigan's Nicole Munger Hit a three-pointer to extend the lead from 4 to 7 points with a little over three minutes left and drew a charge in the final minute of play then was fouled on the inbound play and hit free throws to put away the game. Michigan's Katelynn Flaherty and Siera Thompson Had 22 and 21 points respectively to help lead the Wolverines to a 78–66 victory over Gonzaga and their first loss.

10th-ranked Florida State took on Winthrop. The Seminoles scored six points before the Eagles would score, the game was never close. Florida State held Winthrop to 3 points in the second quarter. Leticia Romero, who had missed some early games with a sore hamstring, scored 17 points to help the Seminoles to a 98–35 win.

Michigan was tied with Winthrop at eight points, almost halfway through the first quarter, but the Wolverines opened up a lead, and extended it in the second quarter when they held Winthrop scoreless for over half the quarter. Michigan opened up the second half strongly including an 11–0 run to put the game out of reach. Twelve Michigan players were in the game for five minutes or more, all but one scored. Michigan won the game 76–39.

10th-ranked Florida State took on 25th ranked Gonzaga in a battle of two ranked teams. Florida State opened up a double-digit lead halfway through the first quarter. Gonzaga managed to cut the lead to single digits on several occasions but never threatened to take a lead. Florida State won 87–69. Leticia Romero of Florida State a career-high 25 points.

Gonzaga took on Winthrop in the final day of the Reef Division. Jill Barta of Gonzaga recorded her first double double of the season with 18 points and 12 rebounds, setting a career-high for rebounds. She helped the Bulldogs to the a 71–41 victory over Winthrop.

Florida State faced Michigan on the final day of the tournament. The game stayed close until midway through the fourth quarter when Florida State extended a single digit lead to double digits and ended up with a 76–62 win to secure first place in the Reef division. Florida State's Shakala Thomas and Imani Wright each scored 19 points, while Thomas pulled down 11 rebounds to record her first double double of the season. Michigan's Katelynn Flaherty and Kysre Gondrezick scored 18 and 17 points respectively.

Leticia Romero of Florida State was named Reef Division MVP. She made 19 of 27 shots for a tournament record 70.4% field-goal percentage. She was joined on the all tournament team by teammate Shakayla Thomas, Michigan's Katlelyn Flaherty and Hallie Thome, and Gonzaga's Jill Barta.

November 24
Michigan	78
Gonzaga	66

November 24
Florida State	93
Winthrop	58

November 25
Winthrop	39
Michigan	76

November 25
Florida State	87
Gonzaga	69

November 26
Gonzaga	71
Winthrop	41

November 26
Florida State	76
Michigan	62
