= 2021 Paradise Jam =

- Season: 2021–22
- Teams: 8
- Finals site: Sports and Fitness Center, Saint Thomas, U.S. Virgin Islands
- Champions: Colorado State (men's); Arizona (women's Island); Texas A&M (women's Reef)
- MVP: David Roddy, Colorado State (men's)

The 2021 Paradise Jam was an early-season men's and women's college basketball tournament. The tournament, which began in 2000, was part of the 2021–22 NCAA Division I men's basketball season and 2021–22 NCAA Division I women's basketball season. The tournament was played at the Sports and Fitness Center in Saint Thomas, U.S. Virgin Islands. Colorado State won the men's tournament, in the women's tournament Arizona won the Island Division, and Texas A&M won the Reef Division.

== Men's tournament ==
=== Bracket ===
5th Place Game; November 22
Brown	52
Colorado	54
7th Place Game
Bradley	70
Duquesne	78

Consolation 2nd Round; November 20
Bradley	62
Brown	65
Duquesne	76
Colorado	84

First Round; November 19
Bradley	60
Colorado State	66
Brown	57
Creighton	78
Northeastern	71
Duquesne	55
Southern Illinois	67
Colorado	63

Semifinals; November 21
Colorado State	95
Creighton	81
Northeastern	59
Southern Illinois	47

Championship; November 22
Colorado State	71
Northeastern	61
3rd Place Game
Creighton	66
Southern Illinois	64

== Women's Tournament ==
=== Island Division ===
November 25
DePaul	77
Rutgers	74

November 25
Vanderbilt	46
Arizona	48

November 26
Rutgers	40
Vanderbilt	51

November 26
Arizona	75
DePaul	68

November 27
Vanderbilt	74
DePaul	91

November 27
Rutgers	44
Arizona	80

=== Reef Division ===
November 25
South Dakota	57
Northwestern	73

November 25
Pittsburgh	46
Texas A&M	57

November 26
Northwestern	60
Pittsburgh	72

November 26
Texas A&M	58
South Dakota	44

November 27
Pittsburgh	61
South Dakota	72

November 27
Northwestern	68
Texas A&M	77

*Tie Breakers: 1. Head-to-head 2. Net margin head-to-head
