= 2014 Paradise Jam =

- Season: 2014–15
- Teams: 8
- Finals site: Sports and Fitness Center, Saint Thomas, U.S. Virgin Islands
- Champions: Seton Hall (men's); Florida Gulf Coast (women's Island); Kentucky (women's Reef)
- MVP: Sterling Gibbs, Seton Hall (men's); Whitney Knight, Florida Gulf Coast (women's Island); Makayla Epps, Kentucky (women's Reef)

The 2014 Paradise Jam was an early-season men's and women's college basketball tournament. The tournament, which began in 2000, was part of the 2014–15 NCAA Division I men's basketball season and 2014–15 NCAA Division I women's basketball season. The tournament was played at the Sports and Fitness Center in Saint Thomas, U.S. Virgin Islands, Seton Hall won the men's tournament, in the women's tournament Florida Gulf Coast won the Island Division and Kentucky won the women's Reef Division.

== Men's tournament ==
=== Bracket ===
5th Place Game; November 24
Clemson	64
LSU	61
7th Place Game
Nevada	56
Weber State	59

Consolation 2nd Round; November 23
Clemson	59
Nevada	50
LSU	72
Weber State	58

First Round; November 21
Clemson	70
Gardner–Webb	72
Seton Hall	68
Nevada	60
LSU	61
Old Dominion	70
Illinois State	73
Weber State	64

Semifinals; November 23
Gardner–Webb	67
Seton Hall	85
Old Dominion	45
Illinois State	64

Championship; November 24
Seton Hall	84
Illinois State	80
3rd Place Game
Gardner-Webb	48
Old Dominion	56

== Women's tournament ==
The women's tournament was played from November 27–29. The women's tournament consisted of eight teams split into two 4-team, round-robin divisions: Island and Reef.

=== Island Division ===
November 27
Clemson	77
Ohio State	86

November 27
Florida Gulf Coast	56
Wichita State	39

November 28
Clemson	61
Florida Gulf Coast	86

November 28
Wichita State	70
Ohio State	50

November 29
Florida Gulf Coast	83
Ohio State	90*

November 29
Wichita State	63
Clemson	48

=== Reef Division ===
November 27
Illinois	77
Kentucky	71

November 27
South Florida	83
Oklahoma	68

November 28
Illinois	61
South Florida	67

November 28
Kentucky	92*
Oklahoma	88

November 29
South Florida	57
Kentucky	61*

November 29
Oklahoma	78*
Illinois	76
