= 2015 Paradise Jam =

- Season: 2015–16
- Teams: 8
- Finals site: Sports and Fitness Center, Saint Thomas, U.S. Virgin Islands
- Champions: South Carolina (men's); Rutgers (women's Island); Maryland (women's Reef)
- MVP: Sindarius Thornwell, South Carolina (men's); Tricia Liston, Duke (women's Island); Brionna Jones, Maryland (women's Reef)

The 2015 Paradise Jam was an early-season men's and women's college basketball tournament. The tournament, which began in 2000, was part of the 2015–16 NCAA Division I men's basketball season and 2015–16 NCAA Division I women's basketball season. The tournament was played at the Sports and Fitness Center in Saint Thomas, U.S. Virgin Islands, South Carolina won the men's tournament, in the women's tournament Rutgers won the Island Division and Maryland won the women's Reef Division.

== Men's tournament ==
=== Bracket ===
5th Place Game; November 23
Ohio	81
Florida State	90
7th Place Game
Norfolk State	78
DePaul	82

Consolation 2nd Round; November 22
Ohio	93
Norfolk State	71
Florida State	83
DePaul	67

First Round; November 20
Ohio	88
Tulsa	90
Indiana State	70
Norfolk State	61
Hofstra	82
Florida State	77
DePaul	61
South Carolina	76

Semifinals; November 22
Tulsa	67
Indiana State	59
Hofstra	84
South Carolina	94

Championship; November 23
Tulsa	75
South Carolina	83
3rd Place Game
Indiana State	67
Hofstra	66

== Women's tournament ==
The women's tournament was played from November 26–28. The women's tournament consisted of 8 teams split into two 4-team, round-robin divisions: Island and Reef.

=== Island Division ===
In the first round of the Island division Rutgers took on Tulane. Rutgers pulled out to a 10-point lead by the end of the first quarter and extended the lead each successive quarter to win 75–51.' Kahleah Copper of Rutgers was the high scorer with 28 points. Virginia played Green Bay in the other game, the. Cavaliers fell behind by 12 points at the end of the first quarter but outscored the Phoenix 22–7 in the third quarter and held on to win 68–59. Mikayla Venson was the high score the Cavaliers with 25 points, while Tesha Buck scored 24 points for Green Bay.

In the second round, Green Bay took on Tulane. The Phoenix opened up a one-point lead at the end of the first quarter and extended it to four points by halftime, Green Bay continued to outscore the Green Wave in the final two periods to win 79–58. Rutgers took on Virginia,. the score was tied at the end of the first quarter, and the Scarlet Knights took a two-point lead into halftime. The scoring was close again in the third quarter but Rutgers outscored Virginia 18–11 in the final quarter to win 60–48. Kahleah Copper was again the high scorer for Rutgers with 21 points.

Rutgers took on Green Bay for the Island division championship. Green Bay led by six at the end of the first quarter and while outscored in the second quarter maintained a small lead at halftime. Rutgers chipped away at the lead and was within one point at the end of the third quarter. But the fourth quarter belonged to the Scarlet Knights as they outscored Green Bay 20 to 8 to capture the Island division championship 54–43. Kayleah Cooper of Rutgers was named Island division MVP. In the consolation round, Tulane took on Virginia. Tulane had a nine-point lead at the end of the first quarter but Virginia came back and cut the lead to one at halftime. Virginia outscored Tulane in the third quarter and held a three-point lead at the end of the third quarter, but Tulane came back in the fourth quarter outscoring Virginia 25–17 to win 67–62.

November 26
Rutgers	75
Tulane	51

November 26
Virginia	68
Green Bay	59

November 27
Green Bay	79
Tulane	58

November 27
Virginia	48
Rutgers	60

November 28
Rutgers	54
Green Bay	43

November 28
Tulane	67
Virginia	62

=== Reef Division ===
South Dakota State and Pittsburgh played a close game in the opening round. With just over two minutes to go in the game the Jackrabbits were down by two, Kerri Young hit a three pointer to put them up by a single point 55–54. Each team then missed their remaining shots and South Dakota State prevailed. Young was the leading scorer for the Jackrabbits with 15 points. In the other Reef division game, Maryland started out very strong, outscoring Old Dominion University 30–6 in the first quarter. They played even in the second quarter but Maryland outscored Old Dominion in each of the final two quarters to win 95 – 49. Brene Moseley of Maryland scored a career-high 26 points to the Terrapins win the game.

Old Dominion faced Pittsburgh in the second round of the Reef division. ODU opened up a small four-point lead at the end of the first quarter, but Pittsburgh came back and led by three points at the half. Each team scored 14 points in the third quarter but Pittsburgh outscored ODU in the final quarter to win 67–58. Aysia Bugg was the high scorer for Pittsburgh with 18 points while Jennie Sims scored 17 points for ODU. In the other Island division game, Maryland faced South Dakota State, The Terrapins started out strongly, leading the Jackrabbits 17–4 at the end of the first quarter. However South Dakota State outscored Maryland in the second and third quarters and had taken the lead by two points in the fourth quarter. Maryland responded with eight straight points to take a four-point lead but the Jackrabbits cut the lead back to within one with just over a minute to go. South Dakota would not score again and Maryland hit free throws in the final minute to win the 62 – 55.

South Dakota State took on Old Dominion in the consolation game. The score was tied at 11 points apiece at the end of the first quarter but then the Jackrabbits took off, outscoring the Monarchs in each of the final three quarters and ended up winning 71–39. In the championship game Maryland played Pittsburgh. Maryland started out strong with a 19 to 11 lead at the end of the first quarter. They then scored 11 consecutive points to push the lead to 31–11. However Pitt did not fold and responded with an 11–2 run. In the third quarter Maryland reasserted its dominance and outscored Pittsburgh 22–11. The fourth quarter was roughly even, but the Terrapins were well ahead so ended the game 70–49 to win the Reef division championship. Briona Jones of Maryland was named Reef Division MVP.

November 26
South Dakota State	55
Pittsburgh	54

November 26
Maryland	95
Old Dominion	49

November 27
Old Dominion	58
Pittsburgh	67

November 27
South Dakota State	55
Maryland	62

November 28
South Dakota State	71
Old Dominion	39

November 28
Maryland	70
Pittsburgh	49
