= 2008 Paradise Jam =

College basketball tournament

- Season: 2008–09
- Teams: 8
- Finals site: Sports and Fitness Center, Saint Thomas, U.S. Virgin Islands
- Champions: Connecticut (men's); Wisconsin (women's Island); California (women's Reef)
- MVP: Hasheem Thabeet, Connecticut (men's); Alyssa Karel, Wisconsin (women's Island); Ashley Walker, California (women's Reef)

The 2008 Paradise Jam was an early-season men's and women's college basketball tournament. The tournament, which began in 2000, was part of the 2008–09 NCAA Division I men's basketball season and 2008–09 NCAA Division I women's basketball season. The tournament was played at the Sports and Fitness Center in Saint Thomas, U.S. Virgin Islands. Connecticut won the men's tournament, in the women's tournament Wisconsin won Island Division, and California won the women's Reef Division.

== Men's tournament ==
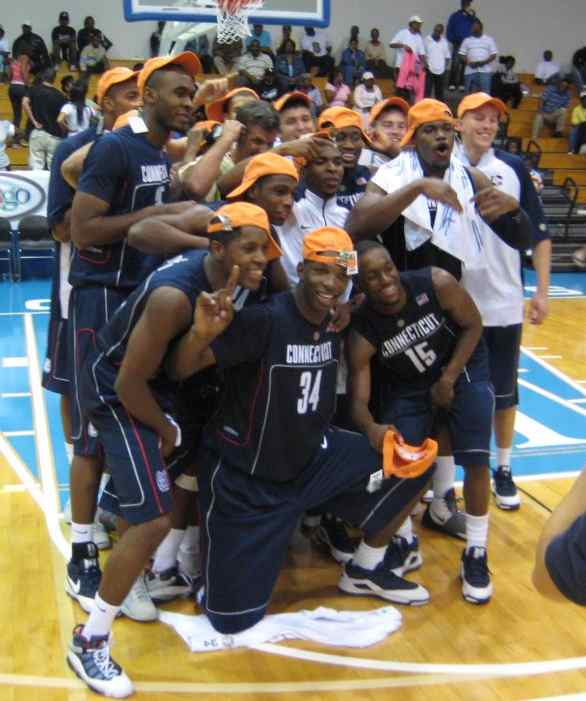
Connecticut team photo 2008, Paradise Jam winners

In the first round, Wisconsin took on unranked Iona, and won, but by only two points 60–58 in overtime. Miami faced unranked Southern Miss and won by ten, 70–50. Connecticut played LaSalle and Connecticut won 89–81; with A.J. Price returning to play after an ankle injury, but still suffering from an abscessed tooth.

In the second round, Connecticut faced Miami, but won by 13 points, 76–63. Wisconsin faced San Diego, the winner of the first round game against Valparaiso, and won 64–49. In the championship game UConn faced Wisconsin, but opened up a ten-point lead by halftime, and extended it to a 19-point victory at the end of the game, with a final score of 76–57. Jerome Dyson was the leading scorer for Connecticut, while Hasheem Thabeet earned the Tournament MVP honors.

=== Bracket ===
5th place game November 24
Southern Miss	64
Iona	63
7th place game
La Salle	75
Valparaiso	70

Consolation 2nd round November 23
Southern Miss	76
La Salle	72
Valparaiso	55
Iona	75

First round November 21
Southern Miss	60
16	Miami	79
La Salle	81
2	Connecticut	89
San Diego	73
Valparaiso	66
Iona	58
22	Wisconsin	60*

Semifinals; November 23
16	Miami	63
2	Connecticut	76
San Diego	49
22	Wisconsin	64

Championship; November 24
2	Connecticut	76
22	Wisconsin	57
3rd place game
16	Miami (FL)	80
San Diego	45

== Women's tournament ==
The women's tournament was organized as two divisions of four teams, each playing each other in a round-robin format.

=== Island Division ===
In the opening round, Wisconsin beat Villanova by two points 47–45, while 7th ranked Baylor beat UCF 79–67. In the second round, Wisconsin improved to 2–0 with a 65–61 victory over UCF, as well as Baylor, who beat Villanova 62–57. Baylor had a 21–2 run early in the game to take a large lead, and the Bears still held a 16-point lead at halftime. The Wildcats cut the lead to three with just over two minutes left in the game, but Baylor hit five of six free throws to hold on to the victory, 52–57.

On the final day, Villanova beat UCF to finish in third place. In the championship game, the two undefeated teams faced each other. Unranked Wisconsin was down by six points at halftime, and Baylor still led by five points with under three minutes to go, when Wisconsin scored six straight points to take the lead, ending with a two-point jump shot with seven seconds left in the game by Alyssa Karel. Baylor had one last shot; Melissa Jones was fouled at the buzzer, but missed both free throws to secure the Paradise Jam Championship (Island) for Wisconsin. Wisconsin's Alyssa Karel won the tournament MVP award.

November 27
Wisconsin	47
Villanova	45

November 27
Baylor	79
UCF	67

November 28
UCF	61
Wisconsin	65

November 28
Villanova	52
Baylor	57

November 29
Villanova	68
UCF	50

November 29
Wisconsin	59
Baylor	57

=== Reef Division ===
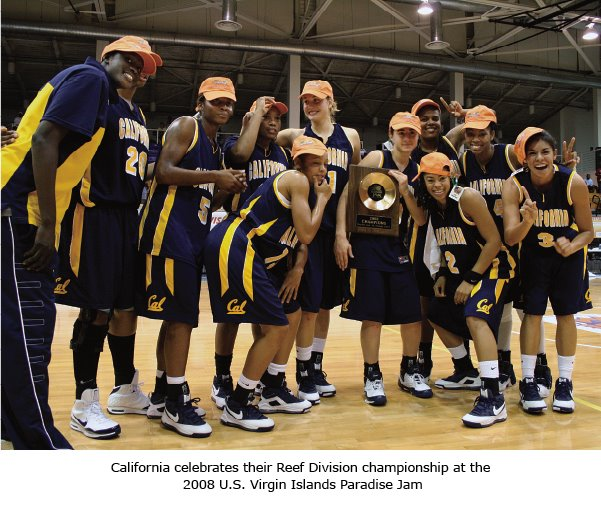
California team photo 2008, Paradise Jam winners

In the first round Iowa played Texas Tech. The halftime margin was two points in favor of Iowa, and they extended the lead to win the game 56–48. In the other game, 3rd-ranked California took on South Florida and won easily, 85–55. In the second round, South Florida took Iowa to overtime, then won 82–79 in overtime. California played Texas Tech and won 68–54. On the final day, South Florida beat Texas Tech to earn second place in the division with a 2–1 record. California easily beat Iowa 76–43 to go undefeated and win the 2008 Paradise Jam Championship (Reef). California's Ashley Walker won the Tournament MVP.

November 27
Iowa	85
Texas Tech	55

November 27
California	85
South Florida	55

November 28
South Florida	82*
Iowa	79

November 28
Texas Tech	54
California	68

November 29
South Florida	71
Texas Tech	61

November 29
California	76
Iowa	43
