= 2013 Paradise Jam =

- Season: 2013–14
- Teams: 8
- Finals site: Sports and Fitness Center, Saint Thomas, U.S. Virgin Islands
- Champions: New Mexico (men's); Connecticut (women's Island); South Carolina (women's Reef)
- MVP: Dez Wells, Maryland (men's); Tricia Liston, Duke (women's Island); Brianna Butler, Syracuse (women's Reef)

The 2013 Paradise Jam was an early-season men's and women's college basketball tournament. The tournament, which began in 2000, was part of the 2013–14 NCAA Division I men's basketball season and 2013–14 NCAA Division I women's basketball season. The tournament was played at the Sports and Fitness Center in Saint Thomas, U.S. Virgin Islands, Maryland won the men's tournament, in the women's tournament Duke won the women's Island Division and Syracuse won the women's Reef Division.

== Men's tournament ==
=== Bracket ===
* – Denotes overtime period

5th-place game November 25
Loyola Marymount	68
Vanderbilt	77
7th-place game
Marist	67
Morgan State	74*

Consolation 2nd Round; November 24
Loyola Marymount	76
Marist	70
Vanderbilt	75
Morgan State	66

First Round; November 22
Northern Iowa	90
Loyola Marymount	81
Marist	43
Maryland	68
Providence	67
Vanderbilt	60
Morgan State	59
La Salle	78

Semifinals; November 24
Northern Iowa	66
Maryland	80
Providence	71
La Salle	63

Championship; November 25
Maryland	56
Providence	52
3rd-place game
Northern Iowa	65
La Salle	50

== Women's tournament ==
The women's tournament consists of 8 teams split into two 4-team, round-robin divisions: Island and Reef.

=== Island Division ===
In the opening round of the Island Division on November 29, Duke beat Xavier 81–54. Kansas followed with a 68—63 victory over Central Michigan.

The following day, Duke struggled early against Central Michigan; down 24–21 in the first half. The Blue Devils then went on an 18–2 run to take a large lead, and cruised to a 97–64 victory. In the other Island Division match-up, Xavier was down 26–20 with a minute to go in the first half, but tied the game at halftime. Kansas again pulled into the lead in the second half, on an 11–2 run to start the half, but Xavier came back to win 64–59.

On the final day of the tournament, Central Michigan beat Xavier 88—62 in the Island Division. In the other match-up, Duke held only a nine-point lead at halftime, but pulled away to win by 33 points, 73–40. With an undefeated record, Duke won the Island Division.

November 29
Duke	81
Xavier	54

November 29
Kansas	68
Central Michigan	63

November 30
Duke	97
Central Michigan	64

November 30
Xavier	64
Kansas	50

November 31
Central Michigan	88
Xavier	62

November 31
Duke	73
Kansas	40

=== Reef Division ===
In the Reef Division first round Texas A&M defeated Memphis 69–59 and Syracuse defeated Texas 75–65.

In the Reef Division, unranked Texas upset previously unbeaten and 12th-ranked Texas A&M 68–59. The Longhorns pulled out to a twelve-point lead at halftime, and the two teams played roughly even in the second half. Texas's Nneka Enemkpali scored 20 points, hitting seven of her eight field goal attempts and six of her eight free throw attempts. In the other Reef Division game, Syracuse pulled out to a 15-point halftime lead against Memphis, and extended the lead in the second half to remain undefeated with a 77–58 win.

In the Reef Division, Texas easily beat Memphis, 65–36 to go 2–1 in the tournament. Syracuse played 12th ranked Texas A&M in the other game. The Aggies led by six early in the game, but Syracuse took over and led by nine at halftime. They pulled out to a large lead in the second half. Texas A&M cut the lead back to single digits, but were unable to re-take the lead. Syracuse won the game 78–63 and won the Reef Division title.

November 29
Texas A&M	69
Memphis	59

November 29
Texas	65
Syracuse	75

November 30
Syracuse	77
Memphis	58

November 30
Texas	69
Texas A&M	58

November 31
Memphis	36
Texas	65

November 31
Texas A&M	63
Syracuse	78
