= 2019 Paradise Jam =

- Season: 2019–20
- Teams: 8
- Finals site: Sports and Fitness Center, Saint Thomas, U.S. Virgin Islands
- Champions: Nevada (men's); Louisville (women's Island); South Carolina (women's Reef)
- MVP: Jalen Harris, Nevada (men's); Dana Evans Louisville (women's Island); Aliyah Boston, South Carolina (women's Reef)

The 2019 Paradise Jam was an early-season men's and women's college basketball tournament. The tournament, which began in 2000, was part of the 2019–20 NCAA Division I men's basketball season and 2019–20 NCAA Division I women's basketball season. The tournament was played at the Sports and Fitness Center in Saint Thomas, U.S. Virgin Islands, Nevada won the men's tournament defeating Bowling Green. in the women's tournament South Carolina won the women's Reef division, and Louisville won the Island division.

* – Denotes overtime period

== Men's tournament ==
=== Non–Bracketed games ===
Non-bracketed games
November 15
Fairmount State	66
Bowling Green	88
November 27
Trinity Christian	71
Valparaiso	98

==== Bracket ====
5th Place Game; November 25
Fordham	64
Western Kentucky	69
7th Place Game
Grand Canyon	68
Illinois State	63

Consolation 2nd Round; November 24
Grand Canyon	58
Fordham	70
Illinois State	69
Western Kentucky	83

First Round; November 22
Valparaiso	78
Grand Canyon	74
Fordham	60
Nevada	74
Illinois State	65
Cincinnati	66
Bowling Green	77
Western Kentucky	75

Semifinals; November 23
Valparaiso	59
Nevada	84
Cincinnati	84*
Bowling Green	91

Championship; November 25
Bowling Green	62
Nevada	77
3rd Place Game
Cincinnati	81*
Valparaiso	77

== Women's tournament ==
The women's tournament was played from November 28–20. The women's tournament consists of 8 teams split into two 4-team, round-robin divisions: Island and Reef.

=== Island Division ===
November 28
	UT Arlington	67
8	Louisville	76

November 28
1	Oregon	89
	Oklahoma State	72

November 29
Louisville	69
Oklahoma State	48

November 29
Oregon	91
UT Arlington	54

November 30
Oklahoma State	60
UT Arlington	47

November 30
8	Louisville	72
1	Oregon	62

=== Reef Division ===
November 28
	Washington State	66
2	Baylor	89

November 28
17	Indiana	71
5	South Carolina	57

November 29
2	Baylor	77
17	Indiana	62

November 29
	Washington State	53
5	South Carolina	68

November 30
	Washington State	44
17	Indiana	78

November 30
5	South Carolina	74
2	Baylor	59
