= 2025 Paradise Jam =

College basketball competition

2025 U.S. Virgin Islands Paradise Jam
- Season: 2025–26
- Teams: 8 men's; 12 women's
- Finals site: Elridge Wilburn Blake Sports and Fitness Center, Charlotte Amalie West, Saint Thomas, United States Virgin Islands
- Champions: Yale (men's); Boise State (women's Harbor Division)

The 2025 U.S. Virgin Islands Paradise Jam is an early-season men's and women's college basketball tournament. The tournament, which began in 2000, is part of the 2025–26 NCAA Division I men's basketball season and 2025–26 NCAA Division I women's basketball season. The tournament was played at the Elridge Wilburn Blake Sports and Fitness Center in Charlotte Amalie West, Saint Thomas, United States Virgin Islands.

== Teams ==
=== Men's teams ===
Team	Most Recent Appearance	Best Finish
Akron	Initial	N/A
Charleston	2006	Eighth (2006)
Evansville	Initial	N/A
Green Bay	Initial	N/A
Iona	2012	Sixth (2008, 2012)
UMass	Initial	N/A
Oregon State	2018	Third (2018)
Yale	Initial	N/A

=== Women's teams ===
Team	Most Recent Appearance	Best Finish
Boise State	Initial	N/A
BYU	Initial	N/A
Elon	Initial	N/A
LSU	2016	Third (2016)
Marist	2012	Third (2012)
Miami (OH)	Initial	N/A
North Dakota	Initial	N/A
Oregon State	2004	Third (2004)
Tulane	2015	Third (2015)
Vanderbilt	2021	Runner-Up (2017)
Virginia Tech	2017	Champion (2003)
Washington State	2019	Runner-Up (2011)

== Men's tournament ==
Matchups for the Men's Paradise Jam were unveiled May 2025.

=== 2025 ===
==== Men's ====
Fourth Place; Monday, November 24; ESPN+
Green Bay	80
Iona	75
Seventh Place; Monday, November 24; ESPN+
UMass	73
Oregon State	65

Consolation Semifinal; Saturday, November 22; ESPN+
Green Bay	79
UMass	75
Iona	91^{2OT}
Oregon State	84

Opening Round; Friday, November 21; ESPN+
Green Bay	67
Yale	73
UMass	65
Charleston	69
Iona	75
Akron	96
Evansville	73
Oregon State	69

Championship Semifinal; Sunday, November 23; ESPN+
Yale	74
Charleston	63
Akron	97
Evansville	59

Championship; Monday, November 24; ESPN+
Yale	97
Akron	94
Third Place; Monday, November 24; ESPN+
Charleston	78
Evansville	59

NOTE: loser of Third Place game finishes in Fifth Place; loser of Fourth Place game finishes in Sixth Place.

== Women's tournament ==
The women's tournament bracket was unveiled July 9, 2025.

=== Harbor division ===
Third Place; Friday, November 28
Elon	65
North Dakota	57

Opening Round; Thursday, November 27
Elon	61
Tulane	64
North Dakota	45
Boise State	65

Championship; Friday, November 28
Tulane	76
Boise State	81

=== Island division ===
Third Place; Saturday, November 29
Virginia Tech	78
Oregon State	67

Opening Round; Thursday, November 27
BYU	64
Virginia Tech	60
Oregon State	66
17	Vanderbilt	88

Championship; Saturday, November 29
BYU	71
17	Vanderbilt	84

=== Reef division ===
Third Place; Saturday, November 29
Miami (OH)	63
Marist	37

Opening Round; Friday, November 28
Miami (OH)	67
Washington State	71
Marist	53
5	LSU	113

Championship; Saturday, November 29
Washington State	35
5	LSU	112
