= 2018–19 Kentucky Wildcats women's basketball team =

Intercollegiate basketball season

2018–19 Kentucky Wildcats women's basketball

Paradise Jam Island Division Champions

NCAA tournament, second round
- Conference: Southeastern Conference

Ranking
- Coaches: No. 21
- AP: No. 17
- Record: 25–8 (11–5 SEC)
- Head coach: Matthew Mitchell (12th season)
- Associate head coach: Kyra Elzy
- Assistant coaches: Niya Butts; Amber Smith
- Home arena: Memorial Coliseum; Rupp Arena

2018–19 SEC women's basketball standings
	Conf.				Overall
Team	W		L	PCT	W		L	PCT
No. 4 Mississippi State †	15	–	1	.938	33	–	3	.917
No. 15 South Carolina	13	–	3	.813	23	–	9	.719
No. 14 Texas A&M	12	–	4	.750	26	–	7	.788
No. 17 Kentucky	11	–	5	.688	25	–	8	.758
Missouri	10	–	6	.625	24	–	11	.686
Auburn	9	–	7	.563	22	–	10	.688
Georgia	9	–	7	.563	18	–	12	.600
Tennessee	7	–	9	.438	19	–	13	.594
LSU	7	–	9	.438	16	–	13	.552
Arkansas	6	–	10	.375	22	–	15	.595
Alabama	5	–	11	.313	14	–	17	.452
Ole Miss	3	–	13	.188	9	–	22	.290
Florida	3	–	13	.188	8	–	23	.258
Vanderbilt	2	–	14	.125	7	–	23	.233
† 2019 SEC tournament winner Rankings from AP poll

The 2018–19 Kentucky Wildcats women's basketball team represented the University of Kentucky in the 2018–19 NCAA Division I women's basketball season. The team played its home games in Lexington, Kentucky at Memorial Coliseum, with two home games being played at Rupp Arena. The team was led by Matthew Mitchell in his twelfth season as head coach. They were a member of the Southeastern Conference. They finished the season 25–8, 11–5 in SEC play to finish in fourth place. They lost in the quarterfinals of the SEC women's tournament to Missouri. They received an at-large bid to the NCAA women's tournament, where they defeated Princeton in the first round before losing to NC State in the second round.

The 2018–19 season opened up with a 10-day trip to Italy, where the team won two out of three games against international competition. The non-conference regular season also featured a trip to the U.S. Virgin Islands, where the team participated in and won the Paradise Jam tournament.

== Previous season ==
The 2017–18 team finished the season 15–17, 6–10 for ninth place in SEC play. They defeated Alabama in the second round of the SEC Tournament before losing to the #1 seed Mississippi State in the quarterfinals. The Wildcats failed to make a postseason appearance for the first time in eight seasons.

== Offseason ==
=== Departures ===
Name	Number	Pos.	Height	Year	Hometown	Notes
Alyssa Rice	45	C	6'3"	Senior	Reynoldsburg, OH	Graduated
Jessica Hardin	15	G	5'8"	RS senior	Monticello, KY	Graduated
Makenzie Cann	22	G	6'1"	Senior	Lawrenceburg, KY	Graduated; transferred to Southeastern University

=== Incoming transfers ===
Name	Pos.	Height	Year	Hometown	Previous school
Nae Nae Cole	C	6'3"	Senior	Gainesville, VA	Transferred from NC State. Would sit out a year due to NCAA transfer rules.
Sabrina Haines	G	5'10"	Senior	Phoenix, AZ	Transferred from Arizona State. Would sit out a year due to NCAA transfer rules.
Chasity Patterson	G	5'5"	Sophomore	Houston, TX	Transferred from Texas. Would sit out a year due to NCAA transfer rules.

=== Newcomers ===
College recruiting
Name	Hometown	School	Height	Weight	Commit date
Rhyne Howard; G	Cleveland, TN	Bradley Central	6 ft 0 in (1.83 m)	N/A	
Rhyne Howard; G	Recruit ratings: ESPN: (97)				
Blair Green; W	Middlesboro, KY	Harlan County	6 ft 0 in (1.83 m)	N/A	
Blair Green; W	Recruit ratings: ESPN: (95)				
Overall recruit ranking:
Note: In many cases, Scout, Rivals, 247Sports, On3, and ESPN may conflict in their listings of height and weight.; In these cases, the average was taken. ESPN grades are on a 100-point scale.; Sources: "2018 Player Commits". ESPN. Archived from the original on July 29, 2018.

== Roster ==
2018–19 Kentucky Wildcats women's basketball team
Players
Coaches

Pos.	#	Name	Height	Year	Previous school	Hometown
F	0	Lashae Halsel	6 ft 0 in (1.83 m)	Sr	Warren Central	Bowling Green, KY
G	1	Sabrina Haines (redshirt)	5 ft 10 in (1.78 m)	RS Jr	Desert Vista; Arizona State	Phoenix, AZ
G	2	Paige Poffenberger	5 ft 8 in (1.73 m)	Sr	Morgantown	Morgantown, WV
F	3	KeKe McKinney	6 ft 1 in (1.85 m)	So	Fulton (TN)	Knoxville, TN
G	4	Maci Morris	6 ft 0 in (1.83 m)	Sr	Bell County	Pineville, KY
G	5	Blair Green	6 ft 0 in (1.83 m)	Fr	Harlan County	Harlan, KY
G	10	Rhyne Howard	6 ft 2 in (1.88 m)	Fr	Bradley Central	Cleveland, TN
G	12	Amanda Paschal	5 ft 7 in (1.7 m)	RS Jr	Chipley; Gulf Coast State	Brooklyn, NY
F	14	Tatyana Wyatt	6 ft 2 in (1.88 m)	So	Columbus	Columbus, GA
G	15	Chasity Patterson (redshirt)	5 ft 5 in (1.65 m)	So	North Shore; Texas	Houston, TX
C	20	Dorie Harrison (injured)	6 ft 3 in (1.91 m)	So	Hillsboro	Nashville, TN
F	21	Ogechi Anyagaligbo	6 ft 1 in (1.85 m)	RS Jr	Miami County Day; Stony Brook	Miami, FL
G	23	Kameron Roach	5 ft 6 in (1.68 m)	So	Lower Richland	Hopkins, SC
G	24	Taylor Murray	5 ft 6 in (1.68 m)	Sr	Annapolis Area Christian	Odenton, MD
G	32	Jaida Roper	5 ft 6 in (1.68 m)	Jr	Houston	Memphis, TN
C	44	Nae Nae Cole (redshirt)	6 ft 3 in (1.91 m)	RS Jr	Paul VI; NC State	Gainesville, VA

Head coach

- Matthew Mitchell (Mississippi State)

Assistant coach(es)

- Kyra Elzy (Tennessee)
- Niya Butts (Tennessee)
- Amber Smith (Kentucky)
- Lin Dunn (UT Martin)

Legend

- (C) Team captain
- (S) Suspended
- (I) Ineligible
- (W) Walk-on
- Injured
- Current redshirt

Roster
Last update: September 15, 2018

== Schedule ==
Date time, TV	Rank^{#}	Opponent^{#}	Result	Record	Site (attendance) city, state
Exhibition
11/02/2018*; 7:00 pm		Lincoln Memorial	W 101–64		Memorial Coliseum (1,203); Lexington, KY
Non-conference regular season
11/07/2018*; 7:00 pm		Alabama State	W 87–35	1–0	Memorial Coliseum (3,676); Lexington, KY
11/11/2018*; 7:00 pm		Southern	W 91–41	2–0	Memorial Coliseum (3,870); Lexington, KY
11/15/2018*; 7:00 pm, SECN		Virginia	W 63–51	3–0	Rupp Arena (4,989); Lexington, KY
11/18/2018*; 2:00 pm		High Point	W 71–49	4–0	Memorial Coliseum (4,064); Lexington, KY
11/22/2018*; 1:00 pm		vs. No. 17 South Florida; Paradise Jam Tournament Island Division	W 85–63	5–0	Sports and Fitness Center (874); St. Thomas, USVI
11/23/2018*; 1:00 pm		vs. UCLA; Paradise Jam Tournament Island Division	W 75–74 ^{OT}	6–0	Sports and Fitness Center; St. Thomas, USVI
11/24/2018*; 1:00 pm		vs. North Carolina; Paradise Jam Tournament Island Division	W 85–75	7–0	Sports and Fitness Center (814); St. Thomas, USVI
11/29/2018*; 12:00 pm	No. 25	Morehead State	W 87–57	8–0	Memorial Coliseum (3,912); Lexington, KY
12/06/2018*; 7:00 pm	No. 19	Rhode Island	W 75–52	9–0	Memorial Coliseum (3,744); Lexington, KY
12/09/2018*; 2:00 pm	No. 19	at No. 5 Louisville; Battle for the Bluegrass	L 75–80	9–1	KFC Yum! Center (13,786); Louisville, KY
12/15/2018*; 1:00 pm	No. 18	Middle Tennessee	W 72–55	10–1	Memorial Coliseum (5,076); Lexington, KY
12/18/2018*; 7:00 pm	No. 18	Western Carolina	W 99–39	11–1	Memorial Coliseum (3,903); Lexington, KY
12/21/2018*; 12:00 pm	No. 18	Murray State	W 88–41	12–1	Memorial Coliseum (4,312); Lexington, KY
12/28/2018*; 11:30 am	No. 18	Sacred Heart	W 71–43	13–1	Memorial Coliseum (4,079); Lexington, KY
SEC regular season
01/03/2019; 7:00 pm	No. 16	Vanderbilt	W 77–55	14–1 (1–0)	Memorial Coliseum (4,030); Lexington, KY
01/06/2019; 5:00 pm, SECN	No. 16	at No. 7 Mississippi State	L 71–86	14–2 (1–1)	Humphrey Coliseum (8,830); Starkville, MS
01/10/2019; 7:00 pm, SECN	No. 16	at No. 13 Tennessee; Rivalry	W 73–71	15–2 (2–1)	Thompson–Boling Arena (8,145); Knoxville, TN
01/13/2019; 1:00 pm, SECN	No. 16	Ole Miss	L 49–55	15–3 (2–2)	Memorial Coliseum (4,577); Lexington, KY
01/17/2019; 7:30 pm	No. 16	at LSU	W 64–60	16–3 (3–2)	Pete Maravich Assembly Center (1,452); Baton Rouge, LA
01/24/2019; 6:30 pm, SECN	No. 15	No. 25 Missouri	W 52–41	17–3 (4–2)	Memorial Coliseum (4,174); Lexington, KY
01/27/2019; 5:00 pm, SECN	No. 15	at No. 24 Texas A&M	L 71–73	17–4 (4–3)	Reed Arena (4,752); College Station, TX
01/31/2019; 6:30 pm, SECN	No. 19	No. 16 South Carolina	L 70–74	17–5 (4–4)	Memorial Coliseum (4,247); Lexington, KY
02/03/2019; 2:00 pm, ESPNU	No. 19	Florida	W 62–51	18–5 (5–4)	Rupp Arena (10,031); Lexington, KY
02/07/2019; 7:00 pm	No. 19	at Auburn	W 78–68	19–5 (6–4)	Auburn Arena (1,604); Auburn, AL
02/11/2019; 7:00 pm, SECN	No. 17	at Alabama	W 68–53	20–5 (7–4)	Coleman Coliseum (2,102); Tuscaloosa, AL
02/17/2019; 2:00 pm	No. 17	Arkansas	W 61–59	21–5 (8–4)	Memorial Coliseum (5,680); Lexington, KY
02/21/2019; 7:00 pm, SECN	No. 16	at No. 13 South Carolina	W 65–57	22–5 (9–4)	Colonial Life Arena (11,887); Columbia, SC
02/24/2019; 2:00 pm	No. 16	LSU	W 57–52	23–5 (10–4)	Memorial Coliseum (6,911); Lexington, KY
02/28/2019; 7:00 pm	No. 11	No. 19 Texas A&M	L 55–63	23–6 (10–5)	Memorial Coliseum (4,532); Lexington, KY
03/03/2019; 1:00 pm, SECN	No. 11	at Georgia	W 58–53	24–6 (11–5)	Stegeman Coliseum (3,461); Athens, GA
SEC Women's tournament
03/08/2019; 2:30 pm, SECN	(4) No. 13	vs. (5) Missouri; Quarterfinals	L 68–70 ^{OT}	24–7	Bon Secours Wellness Arena (4,431); Greenville, SC
NCAA Women's tournament
03/23/2019*; 11:00 am, ESPN2	(6 G) No. 17	vs. (11 G) Princeton; First Round	W 82–77	25–7	Reynolds Coliseum; Raleigh, NC
03/25/2019*; 7:00 pm, ESPN	(6 G) No. 17	at (3 G) No. 10 NC State; Second Round	L 57–72	25–8	Reynolds Coliseum (2,683); Raleigh, NC
*Non-conference game. ^{#}Rankings from AP Poll. (#) Tournament seedings in parentheses. G=Greensboro Region. All times are in Eastern Time.

== Rankings ==
Ranking movements Legend: ██ Increase in ranking ██ Decrease in ranking — = Not ranked RV = Received votes т = Tied with team above or below
	Week																			
Poll	Pre	1	2	3	4	5	6	7	8	9	10	11	12	13	14	15	16	17	18	Final
AP	—	—	—	25	19	18	18	18	16	16	16	15	19	19	17	16	11	13	18	Not released
Coaches	—	—	RV	25	19-T	20	18-T	17	15	16	15	12	15	17	18	17	13	14	17	21

== See also ==
- 2018–19 Kentucky Wildcats men's basketball team
