= 2025–26 Washington State Cougars women's basketball team =

American college basketball season

2025–26 Washington State Cougars women's basketball
- Conference: West Coast Conference
- Record: 9–25 (6–12 WCC)
- Head coach: Kamie Ethridge (8th season)
- Assistant coaches: Laurie Koehn; Camille Williams; Matt Smith
- Home arena: Beasley Coliseum

2025–26 West Coast Conference women's basketball standings
	Conf.				Overall
Team	W		L	PCT	W		L	PCT
Loyola Marymount	15	–	3	.833	21	–	10	.677
Gonzaga †	14	–	4	.778	24	–	10	.706
Santa Clara	13	–	5	.722	24	–	10	.706
Oregon State	13	–	5	.722	23	–	12	.657
Portland	11	–	7	.611	20	–	15	.571
Pepperdine	10	–	8	.556	21	–	13	.618
San Francisco	9	–	9	.500	19	–	15	.559
Pacific	6	–	12	.333	11	–	19	.367
Washington State	6	–	12	.333	9	–	25	.265
Saint Mary's	6	–	12	.333	15	–	17	.469
San Diego	4	–	14	.222	11	–	22	.333
Seattle	1	–	17	.056	5	–	25	.167
† 2026 WCC tournament winner

The 2025–26 Washington State Cougars women's basketball team represented Washington State University during the 2025-26 NCAA Division I women's basketball season. The Cougars, led by eighth-year head coach Kamie Ethridge, played their home games at Beasley Coliseum as affiliate members of the West Coast Conference.

== Previous season ==
The Cougars finished with a regular season record of 21–14 and a conference record of 14–6 in WCC to finish in third place. As a No. 3 seed in the WCC tournament, they defeated Pacific in the first before losing to Portland in the second round. They received an at-large bid to the WNIT, where they defeated Utah Valley in the first round before losing to North Dakota State in the second round.

This was the first of two seasons as a WCC member before they joined the newly revived Pac-12 in the 2026–27 season.

== Offseason ==
=== Departures ===
Washington State departures
Name	Num	Pos.	Height	Year	Hometown	Reason for departure
Tara Wallack	1	G	6'2"	Senior	South Surrey, BC	Graduated
Candace Kpetikou	3	C	6'3"	(redshirt) Freshman	Niamey, Niger	Transferred to Miami
Alice Dart	7	G	5'7"	Junior	Brisbane, Australia	Transferred to Buffalo
Astera Tuhina	11	G	5'9"	Junior	Pristina, Kosovo	Transferred to Oregon
Kyra Gardner	12	G	5'11"	Junior	Raymond, WA	Transferred to Idaho
Dayana Mendes	13	F	6'2"	Freshman	Paris, France	Transferred to USC
Jenna Villa	34	G	6'1"	Sophomore	Arlington, WA	Transferred to Oregon State

=== Incoming ===
Washington State incoming transfers
Name	Num	Pos.	Height	Year	Hometown	Previous school
Mackenzie Chatfield	8	G	5'9"	Junior	Auckland, New Zealand	Western Kentucky
Lauren Glazier	25	F	6'4"	Senior	North Bend, WA	Pacific

==== Recruiting ====
There was no recruiting class of 2025.

== Roster ==
2025–26 Washington State Cougars women's basketball team
Players
Coaches

Pos.	#	Name	Height	Year	Previous school	Hometown
G	1	Malvina Haziri	5 ft 9 in (1.75 m)	Fr	KBF Prishtina	Vushtrria, Kosovo
G	2	Eleonora Villa	5 ft 8 in (1.73 m)	Jr	Costa Masnaga	Lissone, Italy
G	5	Jean Chiu	5 ft 7 in (1.7 m)	Sr	New Taipei Municipal Tam-Shui Vocational HS; Taipei	Taipei, Taiwan
F	6	Tahara Magassa	6 ft 4 in (1.93 m)	Fr	Saint-Amand Hainut	Paris, France
G	8	Mackenzie Chatfield	5 ft 9 in (1.75 m)	Jr	Westlake Girls HS; Western Kentucky	Auckland, New Zealand
G	9	Tanja Valancic	6 ft 0 in (1.83 m)	Fr	Akson Ilirija	Ljubljana, Slovenia
G	10	Charlotte Abraham	6 ft 0 in (1.83 m)	So	Lycée Marguerite de Flandre	Cambrai, France
G	12	Marta Alsina	5 ft 11 in (1.8 m)	So	Institut Joaquim Blume	Barcelona, Spain
G/F	15	Keandra Koorits	6 ft 2 in (1.88 m)	RS Fr	Audentes Sports Gymnasium	Tallinn, Estonia
F	25	Lauren Glazier	6 ft 4 in (1.93 m)	Sr	Mount Si HS	North Bend, WA
G	33	Alex Covill	6 ft 6 in (1.98 m)	Jr	Hellgate HS	Missoula, MT
C	55	Malia Ruud	6 ft 2 in (1.88 m)	Fr	Chiawana HS	Pasco, WA

Head coach

- Kamie Ethridge (Texas)

Assistant coach(es)

- Laurie Koehn (Kansas State)
- Camille Williams (Wisconsin)
- Matt Smith

Legend

- (C) Team captain
- (S) Suspended
- (I) Ineligible
- (W) Walk-on
- Injured
- Current redshirt

Roster

== Schedule and results ==
Date time, TV	Rank^{#}	Opponent^{#}	Result	Record	High points	High rebounds	High assists	Site (attendance) city, state
Exhibition
October 26, 2025*; 12:00 p.m.		Eastern Oregon	W 92–41		–	–	–	Beasley Coliseum; Pullman, WA
Non-conference regular Season
November 3, 2025*; 11:00 a.m., ESPN+		Idaho; Battle of the Palouse	L 85–87	0–1	24 – Villa	7 – Abraham	4 – Chatfield	Beasley Coliseum (1,382); Pullman, WA
November 5, 2025*; 6:30 p.m., MW Network		at UNLV	L 51–64	0–2	19 – Villa	8 – Valancic	3 – Tied	Cox Pavilion (1,256); Las Vegas, NV
November 8, 2025*; 1:00 p.m., ESPN+		at Southern Utah	L 64–77	0–3	21 – Villa	10 – Abraham	4 – Villa	America First Event Center (423); Cedar City, UT
November 14, 2025*; 4:00 p.m., ESPN+		Stanford	L 46–54	0–4	11 – Ruud	7 – Ruud	2 – Tied	Beasley Coliseum (1,318); Pullman, WA
November 19, 2025*; 4:00 p.m., ESPN+		Oregon	L 59–86	0–5	19 – Ruud	6 – Alsina	6 – Chatfield	Beasley Coliseum (920); Pullman, WA
November 23, 2025*; 12:00 p.m., ESPN+		vs. Missouri; 2025 WBCA Showcase	L 54–71	0–6	24 – Villa	8 – Valancic	5 – Villa	ESPN Wide World of Sports Complex (523); Orlando, FL
November 28, 2025*; 2:30 p.m., ESPN+		vs. Miami (OH); Paradise Jam Reef Division semifinals	W 71–67	1–6	25 – Villa	7 – Ruud	5 – Haziri	UVI Sports and Fitness Center; Saint Thomas, U.S. Virgin Islands
November 29, 2025*; 4:30 p.m., ESPN+		vs. No. 5 LSU; Paradise Jam Reef Division championship game	L 35-112	1−7	10 – Abraham	2 – Tied	5 – Alsina	UVI Sports and Fitness Center (2,424); Saint Thomas, U.S. Virgin Islands
December 3, 2025*; 1:00 p.m., ESPN+		vs. BYU	L 54-56	1−8	23 – Villa	8 – Chatfield	4 – Chatfield	Delta Center (274); Salt Lake City, UT
December 10, 2025*; 6:00 p.m., ESPN+		Eastern Washington	L 69-71	1−9	22 – Abraham	7 – Valancic	4 – Tied	Beasley Coliseum (925); Pullman, WA
December 12, 2025*; 6:00 p.m., ESPN+		Texas Tech	L 51-82	1−10	16 – Ruud	8 – Koorits	4 – Villa	Beasley Coliseum (862); Pullman, WA
December 16, 2025*; 4:00 p.m., ESPN+		at Seton Hall	L 65-74	1−11	17 – Villa	7 – Abraham	5 – Villa	Walsh Gymnasium (556); South Orange, NJ
December 19, 2025*; 8:00 a.m., ESPN+		at Penn	L 62-67	1−12	21 – Villa	6 – Tied	6 – Villa	The Palestra (768); Philadelphia, PA
WCC regular season
December 28, 2025; 12:00 p.m., ESPN+		Pepperdine	W 66-63	2−12 (1−0)	17 – Villa	10 – Abraham	5 – Chatfield	Beasley Coliseum (997); Pullman, WA
December 30, 2025; 6:00 p.m., ESPN+		LMU	L 58-67	2−13 (1−1)	21 – Villa	11 – Abraham	4 – Abraham	Beasley Coliseum (887); Pullman, WA
January 2, 2026; 6:00 p.m., ESPN+		at Portland	L 49-62	2−14 (1−2)	14 – Ruud	9 – Abraham	3 – Tied	Chiles Center (840); Portland, OR
January 4, 2026; 1:00 p.m., ESPN+		at Seattle	W 73-69	3−14 (2−2)	26 – Covill	10 – Covill	4 – Villa	Redhawk Center (432); Seattle, WA
January 8, 2026; 6:00 p.m., ESPN+		Oregon State	L 64-78	3−15 (2−3)	16 – Villa	8 – Chatfield	5 – Villa	Beasley Coliseum (886); Pullman, WA
January 10, 2026; 12:00 p.m., ESPN+		Santa Clara	L 92-98	3-16 (2-4)	29 – Villa	11 – Abraham	6 – Chatfield	Beasley Coliseum (883); Pullman, WA
January 15, 2026; 6:30 p.m., ESPN+		at Saint Mary's	W 68-64 ^{OT}	4-16 (3-4)	16 – Villa	10 – Valancic	6 – Villa	University Credit Union Pavilion (287); Moraga, CA
January 17, 2026; 6:00 p.m., ESPN+		San Francisco	L 72-85	4-17 (3-5)	18 – Villa	4 – Tied	5 – Chatfield	Beasley Coliseum (900); Pullman, WA
January 22, 2026; 6:00 p.m., ESPN+		at Pacific	L 53-65	4-18 (3-6)	12 – Abraham	7 – Valancic	5 – Villa	Alex G. Spanos Center; Stockton, CA
January 29, 2026; 6:00 p.m., ESPN+		at Santa Clara	L 71-102	4-19 (3-7)	18 – Villa	5 – Tied	5 – Villa	Leavey Center; Santa Clara, CA
January 31, 2026; 7:00 p.m., ESPN+		Gonzaga	L 75-81	4-20 (3-8)	22 – Villa	6 – Valancic	6 – Chatfield	Beasley Coliseum (1,470); Pullman, WA
February 5, 2026; 6:00 p.m., ESPN+		at San Diego	W 80-76	5-20 (4-8)	19 – Ruud	7 – Chatfield	5 – Tied	Jenny Craig Pavilion (922); San Diego, CA
February 7, 2026; 1:00 p.m., ESPN+		at Pepperdine	L 62-78	5-21 (4-9)	15 – Abraham	7 – Valancic	8 – Chatfield	Firestone Fieldhouse (370); Malibu, CA
February 12, 2026; 6:00 p.m., ESPN+		Portland	L 61-68	5-22 (4-10)	18 – Abraham	8 – Abraham	7 – Villa	Beasley Coliseum (905); Pullman, WA
February 19, 2026; 6:00 p.m., ESPN+		at Gonzaga	L 50-75	5-23 (4-11)	13 – Villa	8 – Abraham	5 – Villa	McCarthey Athletic Center (5,193); Spokane, WA
February 21, 2026; 1:00 p.m., ESPN+		at Oregon State	L 51-79	5-24 (4-12)	15 – Covill	7 – Abraham	4 – Villa	Gill Coliseum (4,473); Corvallis, OR
February 26, 2026; 6:00 p.m., ESPN+		Seattle	W 69-55	6-24 (5-12)	18 – Covill	7 – Tied	7 – Chatfield	Beasley Coliseum (939); Pullman, WA
February 28, 2026; 12:00 p.m., ESPN+		Saint Mary's	W 57-50	7-24 (6-12)	13 – Villa	8 – Covill	4 – Chatfield	Beasley Coliseum (1,215); Pullman, WA
WCC Women's Tournament
March 5, 2026; 12:00 p.m., ESPN+	(9)	vs. (12) Seattle; First Round	W 80-58	8-24	22 – Villa	7 – Tied	5 – Chatfield	Orleans Arena; Las Vegas, NV
March 6, 2026; 12:00 p.m., ESPN+	(9)	vs. (8) Pacific; Second Round	W 82-76	9-24	22 – Villa	9 – Ruud	7 – Villa	Orleans Arena (977); Las Vegas, NV
March 7, 2026; 12:00 p.m., ESPN+	(9)	vs. (5) Portland; Third Round	L 62-72	9-25	16 – Villa	7 – Tied	5 – Alsina	Orleans Arena (1,289); Las Vegas, NV
*Non-conference game. ^{#}Rankings from AP Poll. (#) Tournament seedings in parentheses. All times are in Pacific Time.

== Game summaries ==
=== Exhibition: Eastern Oregon ===
Oct. 26
12 p.m. PDT

Recap

Eastern Oregon Mountaineers 41, Washington State Cougars 92

Beasley Coliseum
Pullman, WA

=== Idaho ===
Broadcasters: Trevor Williams and Matt Muehlebach

Series history: Washington State leads 29-13
Starting lineups:

- Idaho: #3 Kyra Gardner, #4 Hope Hassmann, #5 Ella Uriarte, #10 Lorena Barbosa, #37 Ana Pinheiro
- Washington State: #2 Eleonora Villa, #8 Mackenzie Chatfield, #9 Tanja Valancic, #10 Charlotte Abraham, #33 Alex Covill

ESPN+

Nov. 3
11 a.m. PDT

Recap

Idaho Vandals 87, Washington State Cougars 85
Scoring by quarter: 24-22, 17-27, 25-20, 21-16
Pts: Kyra Gardner 26; Rebs: Kyra Gardner 8 Asts: Hope Hassmann 4	Pts: Eleonora Villa 24; Rebs: Charlotte Abraham 7 Asts: Mackenzie Chatfield 4

Beasley Coliseum
Pullman, WA
Attendance: 1,382
Referees: Michael An Ure, Clifford Sims, Sean Martin

=== at UNLV ===
Broadcasters: Wyatt Tomchek and Kevaney Martin

Series history: UNLV leads 1-0
Starting lineups:

- Washington State: #2 Eleonora Villa, #8 Mackenzie Chatfield, #9 Tanja Valancic, #10 Charlotte Abraham, #33 Alex Covill
- UNLV: #0 Teagan Colvin, #3 Shelbee Brown, #10 Jasmyn Lott, #25 Aaliyah Alexander, #32 Meadow Roland

MW Network

Nov. 5
6:30 p.m. PDT

Recap

Washington State Cougars 51, UNLV Lady Rebels 64
Scoring by quarter: 12-16, 17-15, 8-16, 14-17
Pts: Eleonora Villa 19; Rebs: Tanja Valancic 8 Asts: Eleonora Villa, Charlotte Abraham, Tanja Valancic 3	Pts: Aaliyah Alexander 18; Rebs: Meadow Roland 9 Asts: Aaliyah Alexander, Teagan Colvin 3

Cox Pavilion
Las Vegas, NV
Attendance: 1,256
Referees: Rochelle Bennett, Lorena Ahumada, Michol Murray

=== at Southern Utah ===
Broadcasters: Spencer McLaughlin and Taigen Lewis

Series history: Washington State leads 3-0
Starting lineups:

- Washington State: #2 Eleonora Villa, #8 Mackenzie Chatfield, #9 Tanja Valancic, #10 Charlotte Abraham, #15 Keandra Koorits
- Southern Utah: #1 Kortney Doman, #3 Sierra Chambers, #4 Brooklyn Fely, #22 Devyn Kiernan, #44 Ava Uhrich

ESPN+

Nov. 8
1 p.m. PDT

Recap

Washington State Cougars 64, Southern Utah Thunderbirds 77
Scoring by quarter: 19-21, 9-13, 19-21, 17-22
Pts: Eleonora Villa 21; Rebs: Charlotte Abraham 10; Asts: Eleonora Villa 4	Pts: Brooklyn Fely 20; Rebs: Brooklyn Fely 13; Asts: Sierra Chambers 6

America First Event Center
Cedar City, UT
Attendance: 423
Referees: Amy Krommenhoek, Jonathan Varela, Darren Krzesnik

=== Stanford ===
Broadcasters: Trevor Williams and Mary Murphy

Series history: Stanford leads 75-0
Starting lineups:

- Stanford: #2 Hailee Swain, #3 Nunu Agara, #10 Talana Lepolo, #12 Lara Somfai, #40 Courtney Ogden
- Washington State: #2 Eleonora Villa, #8 Mackenzie Chatfield, #9 Tanja Valancic, #10 Charlotte Abraham, #55 Malia Ruud

ESPN+

Nov. 14
4 p.m. PDT

Recap

Stanford Cardinal 54, Washington State Cougars 46
Scoring by quarter: 16-11, 16-14, 12-9, 10-12
Pts: Hailee Swain 10; Rebs: Nunu Agara 8 Asts: Talana Lepolo, Chloe Clardy 3	Pts: Malia Ruud 11; Rebs: Malia Ruud 7 Asts: Malia Ruud, Malvina Haziri 2

Beasley Coliseum
Pullman, WA
Attendance: 1,318
Referees: Cheryll Blue, Corey Long, Benny Luna

=== Oregon ===
Broadcasters: Ann Schatz and Mary Murphy

Series history: Oregon leads 73-22
Starting lineups:

- Oregon: #1 Mia Jacobs, #2 Katie Fiso, #3 Sofia Bell, #14 Ari Long, #23 Sarah Rambus
- Washington State: #2 Eleonora Villa, #8 Mackenzie Chatfield, #9 Tanja Valancic, #10 Charlotte Abraham, #55 Malia Ruud

ESPN+

Nov. 19
4 p.m. PDT

Recap

Oregon Ducks 86, Washington State Cougars 59
Scoring by quarter: 19-11, 16-11, 28-20, 23-17
Pts: Katie Fiso 22; Rebs: Ehis Etute 13; Asts: Katie Fiso 8	Pts: Malia Ruud 19; Rebs: Marta Alsina 6 Asts: Mackenzie Chatfield 6

Beasley Coliseum
Pullman, WA
Attendance: 920
Referees: Angie Leite, Brian Woods, Robert Scofield

=== vs. Missouri ===
Broadcasters: Austin Lyon and Christy Thomaskutty

Series history: First meeting
Starting lineups:

- Washington State: #2 Eleonora Villa, #8 Mackenzie Chatfield, #9 Tanja Valancic, #10 Charlotte Abraham, #55 Malia Ruud
- Missouri: #0 Grace Slaughter, #1 Shannon Dowell, #10 Jordana Reisma, #22 Chloe Sotell, #23 Abbey Schreacke

ESPN+

Nov. 23
12 p.m. PDT

Recap

Washington State Cougars 54, Missouri Tigers 71
Scoring by quarter: 13-21, 17-21, 12-11, 12-18
Pts: Eleonora Villa 24; Rebs: Tanja Valancic 8 Asts: Eleonora Villa 5	Pts: Shannon Dowell 20; Rebs: Shannon Dowell 10; Asts: Chloe Sotell 5

ESPN Wide World of Sports Complex
Orlando, FL
Attendance: 523
Referees: Rod Creech, Saif Esho, Brenda Pantoja

=== vs. Miami (OH) ===
Broadcasters: Brad Wells and Kevin Lehman

Series history: First meeting
Starting lineups:

- Miami (OH): #1 Amber Scalia, #13 Tamar Singer, #15 Amber Tretter, #17 Nuria Jurjo, #21 Ilse de Vries
- Washington State: #2 Eleonora Villa, #8 Mackenzie Chatfield, #9 Tanja Valancic, #10 Charlotte Abraham, #55 Malia Ruud

ESPN+

Nov. 28
2:30 p.m. PDT

Recap

Miami (OH) RedHawks 67, Washington State Cougars 71
Scoring by quarter: 12-15, 14-18, 21-15, 20-23
Pts: Ilse de Vries 16; Rebs: Amber Tretter 15; Asts: Tamar Singer 6	Pts: Eleonora Villa 25; Rebs: Malia Ruud 7 Asts: Malvina Haziri 5

UVI Sports and Fitness Center
Saint Thomas, U.S. Virgin Islands
Referees: Cynthia Do, Simona Petronyte, Nicole Brannon

=== vs. No. 5 LSU ===
Broadcasters: Brad Wells and Kevin Lehman

Series history: LSU leads 2-0
Starting lineups:

- Washington State: #2 Eleonora Villa, #8 Mackenzie Chatfield, #9 Tanja Valancic, #10 Charlotte Abraham, #55 Malia Ruud
- LSU: #1 Amiya Joyner, #4 Flau'jae Johnson, #11 ZaKiyah Johnson, #12 Mikaylah Williams, #30 Jada Richard

ESPN+

Nov. 29
4:30 p.m. PDT

Recap

Washington State Cougars 35, No. 5 LSU Tigers 112
Scoring by quarter: 8-29, 9-25, 15-30, 3-28
Pts: Charlotte Abraham 10; Rebs: Charlotte Abraham, Malia Ruud, Mackenzie Chatfield, Malvina Haziri 2 Asts: Marta Alsina 5	Pts: Flau'jae Johnson 16; Rebs: Amiya Joiner 12; Asts: MiLaysia Fulwiley 5

UVI Sports and Fitness Center
Saint Thomas, U.S. Virgin Islands
Attendance: 2,424
Referees: Kenya Kirkland, Trevor Inouye, Rod Creech

=== vs. BYU ===
Broadcasters: Spencer Linton and Kristen Kozlowski

Series history: BYU leads 8-6
Starting lineups:

- Washington State: #2 Eleonora Villa, #8 Mackenzie Chatfield, #9 Tanja Valancic, #10 Charlotte Abraham, #55 Malia Ruud
- BYU: #2 Sydney Benally, #7 Olivia Hamlin, #13 Lara Rohkohl, #23 Marya Hudgins, #24 Brinley Cannon

ESPN+

Dec. 3
1 p.m. PDT

Recap

Washington State Cougars 54, BYU Cougars 56
Scoring by quarter: 10-14, 12-10, 17-12, 15-20
Pts: Eleonora Villa 23; Rebs: Mackenzie Chatfield 8 Asts: Mackenzie Chatfield 4	Pts: Olivia Hamlin, Arielle Mackey-Williams 14; Rebs: Marya Hudgins, Brinley Cannon 9 Asts: Brinley Cannon, Arielle Mackey-Williams, Bolanle Yussuf 1

Delta Center
Salt Lake City, UT
Attendance: 274
Referees: Infini Robinson, Michol Murray, Lisa Jones

=== Eastern Washington ===
Broadcasters: Trevor Williams and Stephanie Freeman

Series history: Washington State leads 28-11
Starting lineups:

- Eastern Washington: #1 Elyn Bowers, #2 Ella Gallatin, #10 Jaecy Eggers, #13 Caitie Gingras, #22 Kourtney Grossman
- Washington State: #2 Eleonora Villa, #8 Mackenzie Chatfield, #9 Tanja Valancic, #10 Charlotte Abraham, #55 Malia Ruud

ESPN+

Dec. 10
6 p.m. PDT

Recap

Eastern Washington Eagles 71, Washington State Cougars 69
Scoring by quarter: 28-15, 17-19, 10-23, 16-12
Pts: Ella Gallatin 22; Rebs: Kourtney Grossman 18; Asts: Elyn Bowers 4	Pts: Charlotte Abraham 22; Rebs: Tanja Valancic 7 Asts: Charlotte Abraham, Mackenzie Chatfield 4

Beasley Coliseum
Pullman, WA
Attendance: 925
Referees: Steve Belnap, Scott Osborne, Lorena Ahumada

=== Texas Tech ===
Broadcasters: Trevor Williams and Stephanie Freeman

Series history: Texas Tech leads 4-0
Starting lineups:

- Texas Tech: #1 Jalynn Bristow, #2 Gemma Nunez, #5 Denae Fritz, #11 Sarengbe Sanogo, #20 Bailey Maupin
- Washington State: #2 Eleonora Villa, #8 Mackenzie Chatfield, #9 Tanja Valancic, #10 Charlotte Abraham, #55 Malia Ruud

ESPN+

Dec. 12
6 p.m. PDT

Recap

Texas Tech Lady Raiders 82, Washington State Cougars 51
Scoring by quarter: 24-16, 20-4, 26-20, 12-11
Pts: Bailey Maupin, Snudda Collins 19; Rebs: Jalynn Bristow 7 Asts: Bailey Maupin 7	Pts: Malia Ruud 16; Rebs: Keandra Koorits 8 Asts: Eleonora Villa 4

Beasley Coliseum
Pullman, WA
Attendance: 862
Referees: Darren Krzesnik, In'Fini Robinson, Lisa Jones

=== at Seton Hall ===
Broadcasters: Ryan Johnston and Lauren DeFalco

Series history: First meeting
Starting lineups:

- Washington State: #2 Eleonora Villa, #8 Mackenzie Chatfield, #9 Tanja Valancic, #10 Charlotte Abraham, #55 Malia Ruud
- Seton Hall: #0 Jada Eads, #5 Savannah Catalon, #6 Mariana Valenzuela, #8 Zahara Bishop, #13 Messiah Hunter

ESPN+

Dec. 16
4 p.m. PDT

Recap

Washington State Cougars 65, Seton Hall Pirates 74
Scoring by quarter: 10-30, 19-14, 17-17, 19-13
Pts: Eleonora Villa 17; Rebs: Charlotte Abraham 7 Asts: Eleonora Villa 5	Pts: Zahara Bishop 19; Rebs: Zahara Bishop 10; Asts: Jada Eads 4

Walsh Gymnasium
South Orange, NJ
Attendance: 556
Referees: Talisa Green, Katie Lukanich, Joseph Vaszily

=== at Penn ===
Broadcasters: Dan Fritz, Renee Washington and Aaron Hook

Series history: First meeting
Starting lineups:

- Washington State: #2 Eleonora Villa, #10 Charlotte Abraham, #12 Marta Alsina, #15 Keandra Koorits, #55 Malia Ruud
- Penn: #4 Saniah Caldwell, #10 Tina Njike, #11 Simone Sawyer, #22 Mataya Gayle, #25 Katie Collins

ESPN+

Dec. 19
8 a.m. PDT

Recap

Washington State Cougars 62, Penn Quakers 67
Scoring by quarter: 15-20, 19-14, 13-18, 15-15
Pts: Eleonora Villa 21; Rebs: Charlotte Abraham, Tanja Valancic 6 Asts: Eleonora Villa 6	Pts: Simone Sawyer, Katie Collins 15; Rebs: Tina Njike 9 Asts: Mataya Gayle 6

The Palestra
Philadelphia, PA
Attendance: 768
Referees: David Troyan, Tasha Smith, John Capolino

=== Pepperdine ===
Broadcasters: Trevor Williams and Mary Murphy

Series history: Washington State leads 4-1
Starting lineups:

- Pepperdine: #1 Taija Santa Maria, #2 Elli Guiney, #12 Shorna Preston, #13 Meghan Fiso, #22 Lina Falk
- Washington State: #2 Eleonora Villa, #10 Charlotte Abraham, #12 Marta Alsina, #33 Alex Covill, #55 Malia Ruud

ESPN+

Dec. 28
12 p.m. PDT

Recap

Pepperdine Waves 63, Washington State Cougars 66
Scoring by quarter: 11-8, 12-16, 16-20, 24-22
Pts: Elli Guiney 26; Rebs: Shorna Preston 11; Asts: Shorna Preston 4	Pts: Eleonora Villa 17; Rebs: Charlotte Abraham 10; Asts: Mackenzie Chatfield 5

Beasley Coliseum
Pullman, WA
Attendance: 997
Referees: Amy Krommenhoek, Teresa Turner, Tyler Trimble

=== LMU ===
Broadcasters: Trevor Williams and Mary Murphy

Series history: Washington State leads 4-1
Starting lineups:

- LMU: #0 Jess Lawson, #5 Carly Heidger, #13 Ivana Krajina, #28 Andjela Matic, #55 Maya Hernandez
- Washington State: #2 Eleonora Villa, #9 Tanja Valancic, #10 Charlotte Abraham, #12 Marta Alsina, #55 Malia Ruud

ESPN+

Dec. 30
6 p.m. PDT

Recap

LMU Lions 67, Washington State Cougars 58
Scoring by quarter: 12-16, 16-12, 26-13, 13-17
Pts: Jess Lawson 16; Rebs: Jess Lawson 11; Asts: Andjela Matic 5	Pts: Eleonora Villa 21; Rebs: Charlotte Abraham 11; Asts: Charlotte Abraham 4

Beasley Coliseum
Pullman, WA
Attendance: 887
Referees: Kaili Kimura, Nicole Leon, Michol Murray

=== at Portland ===
Broadcasters: Bryan Sleik and Chris Clayton

Series history: Portland leads 9-2
Starting lineups:

- Washington State: #2 Eleonora Villa, #8 Mackenzie Chatfield, #9 Tanja Valancic, #10 Charlotte Abraham, #55 Malia Ruud
- Portland: #2 Dyani Ananiev, #3 Florence Dallow, #20 Lainey Spear, #22 Rhyan Mogel, #44 Julia Dalan

ESPN+

Jan. 2
6 p.m. PDT

Recap

Washington State Cougars 49, Portland Pilots 62
Scoring by quarter: 14-14, 10-12, 12-20, 13-16
Pts: Malia Ruud 14; Rebs: Charlotte Abraham 9 Asts: Eleonora Villa, Mackenzie Chatfield 3	Pts: Julia Dalan 14; Rebs: Julian Dalan, Florence Dallow 7 Asts: Rhyan Mogel 5

Chiles Center
Portland, OR
Attendance: 840
Referees: Sean Martin, Ashley Ellis, Lisa Jones

=== at Seattle ===
Broadcasters: Adam Race and Olivia Crawford

Series history: Washington State leads 10-2
Starting lineups:

- Washington State: #2 Eleonora Villa, #8 Mackenzie Chatfield, #10 Charlotte Abraham, #33 Alex Covill, #55 Malia Ruud
- Seattle: #3 Ella Brubaker, #5 Dylan Mogel, #7 Lucija Milkovic, #14 Tamia Stricklin, #24 Sydnie Rodriguez

ESPN+

Jan. 4
1 p.m. PDT

Recap

Washington State Cougars 73, Seattle Redhawks 69
Scoring by quarter: 25-24, 20-13, 10-17, 18-15
Pts: Alex Covill 26; Rebs: Alex Covill 10; Asts: Eleonora Villa 4	Pts: Ella Brubaker 17; Rebs: Lucija Milkovic 9 Asts: Tamia Stricklin 5

Redhawk Center
Seattle, WA
Attendance: 432
Referees: Michael Thorner, Danielle Johnson, Corey Long

=== Oregon State ===
Broadcasters: Trevor Williams and Mary Murphy

Series history: Oregon State leads 60-37
Starting lineups:

- Oregon State: #0 Tiara Bolden, #1 Kennedie Shuler, #3 Jenna Villa, #4 Ally Schimel, #15 Lizzy Williamson
- Washington State: #2 Eleonora Villa, #8 Mackenzie Chatfield, #10 Charlotte Abraham, #33 Alex Covill, #55 Malia Ruud

ESPN+

Jan. 8
6 p.m. PDT

Recap

Oregon State Beavers 78, Washington State Cougars 64
Scoring by quarter: 24-12, 18-11, 24-22, 12-19
Pts: Tiara Bolden 24; Rebs: Nene Sow 7 Asts: Kennedie Shuler 7	Pts: Eleonora Villa 16; Rebs: Mackenzie Chatfield 8 Asts: Eleonora Villa 5

Beasley Coliseum
Pullman, WA
Attendance: 886
Referees: Michal Ann Ure, Dominique Hunter, Benny Luna

=== Santa Clara ===
Broadcasters: Trevor Williams and Mary Murphy

Series history: Tied 5-5
Starting lineups:

- Santa Clara: #0 Maia Jones, #12 Sophie Glancey, #13 Ava Schmidt, #23 Ashley Hawkins, #30 Kylee Fox
- Washington State: #2 Eleonora Villa, #8 Mackenzie Chatfield, #10 Charlotte Abraham, #33 Alex Covill, #55 Malia Ruud

ESPN+

Jan. 10
12 p.m. PDT

Recap

Santa Clara Broncos 98, Washington State Cougars 92
Scoring by quarter: 26-23, 27-15, 20-31, 25-23
Pts: Ashley Hawkins 26; Rebs: Ashely Hawkins, Kylee Fox, Delainey Miller 6 Asts: Ashley Hawkins 8	Pts: Eleonora Villa 29; Rebs: Charlotte Abraham 11; Asts: Mackenzie Chatfield 6

Beasley Coliseum
Pullman, WA
Attendance: 883
Referees: Matthew Head, Marissa Cannon, Brian Woods

=== at Saint Mary's ===
Broadcasters: Ryan Barnett and Evan Giddings

Series history: Saint Mary's leads 7-5
Starting lineups:

- Washington State: #2 Eleonora Villa, #8 Mackenzie Chatfield, #10 Charlotte Abraham, #33 Alex Covill, #55 Malia Ruud
- Saint Mary's: #4 Charlece Ohiaeri, #5 Abigail Shoff, #7 Edie Clarke, #13 Malia Latu, #23 Addi Wedin

ESPN+

Jan. 15
6:30 p.m. PDT

Recap

Washington State Cougars 68, Saint Mary's Gaels 64 (OT)
Scoring by quarter: 16-10, 14-20, 14-17, 13-10, Overtime: 11-7
Pts: Eleonora Villa 16; Rebs: Tanja Valancic 10; Asts: Eleonora Villa 6	Pts: Abigail Shoff 18; Rebs: Edie Clarke 6 Asts: Mauriana Hashemian-Orr 6

University Credit Union Pavilion
Moraga, CA
Attendance: 287
Referees: Breana Fields, Deon Lewis, Lorena Ahumada

=== San Francisco ===
Broadcasters: Trevor Williams and Stephanie Freeman

Series history: Washington State leads 11-2
Starting lineups:

- San Francisco: #2 Mara Neira, #3 Noelia Mourino, #9 Aina Cargol, #12 Natasa Tausova, #23 Candy Edokpaigbe
- Washington State: #2 Eleonora Villa, #8 Mackenzie Chatfield, #10 Charlotte Abraham, #33 Alex Covill, #55 Malia Ruud

ESPN+

Jan. 17
6 p.m. PDT

Recap

San Francisco Dons 85, Washington State Cougars 72
Scoring by quarter: 23-19, 20-16, 16-19, 26-18
Pts: Aina Cargol 21; Rebs: Noelia Mourino 12; Asts: Aina Cargol 7	Pts: Eleonora Villa 18; Rebs: Keandra Koorits 4 Asts: Mackenzie Chatfield 5

Beasley Coliseum
Pullman, WA
Attendance: 900
Referees: Allen Curry, Michael Thorner, Scott Osborne

=== at Pacific ===
Broadcasters: Don Gubbins and Celeste Gehring

Series history: Washington State leads 5-2
Starting lineups:

- Washington State: #2 Eleonora Villa, #8 Mackenzie Chatfield, #10 Charlotte Abraham, #33 Alex Covill, #55 Malia Ruud
- Pacific: #5 Stella Szabo, #8 Sophia Mindermann, #10 Sydney Ward, #21 Daria Nestorov, #25 Winner Bartholomew

ESPN+

Jan. 22
6 p.m. PDT

Recap

Washington State Cougars 53, Pacific Tigers 65
Scoring by quarter: 11-12, 14-14, 11-19, 17-20
Pts: Charlotte Abraham 12; Rebs: Tanja Valancic 7 Asts: Eleonora Villa 5	Pts: Daria Nestorov 15; Rebs: Sydney Ward 9 Asts: Daria Nestorov, Syndey Ward 4

Alex G. Spanos Center
Stockton, CA
Attendance: 494
Referees: Josh Batin, Kathleen Cassidy, Marc Merritt

=== at Santa Clara ===
Broadcasters: Joe Ritzo and Thomas Dunn

Series history: Santa Clara leads 6-5
Starting lineups:

- Washington State: #2 Eleonora Villa, #8 Mackenzie Chatfield, #9 Tanja Valancic, #10 Charlotte Abraham, #33 Alex Covill
- Santa Clara: #0 Maia Jones, #13 Ava Schmidt, #20 Delainey Miller, #23 Ashley Hawkins, #30 Kylee Fox

ESPN+

Jan. 29
6 p.m. PDT

Recap

Washington State Cougars 71, Santa Clara Broncos 102
Scoring by quarter: 21-29, 14-23, 21-32, 15-18
Pts: Eleonora Villa 18; Rebs: Tanja Valancic, Alex Covill, Charlotte Abraham, Malia Ruud 5 Asts: Eleonora Villa 5	Pts: Ashley Hawkins 20; Rebs: Delainey Miller 7 Asts: Ashley Hawkins 7

Leavey Center
Santa Clara, CA
Referees: Kenneth Nash, Danielle Johnson, Adreanna Broussard

=== Gonzaga ===
Broadcasters: Trevor Williams and Ernie Kent

Series history: Washington State leads 22-13
Starting lineups:

- Gonzaga: #8 Inês Bettencourt, #11 Allie Turner, #20 Taylor Smith, #33 Lauren Whittaker, #55 Zeryhia Aokuso
- Washington State: #2 Eleonora Villa, #8 Mackenzie Chatfield, #9 Tanja Valancic, #10 Charlotte Abraham, #55 Malia Ruud

ESPN+

Jan. 31
7 p.m. PDT

Gonzaga Bulldogs 81, Washington State Cougars 75
Scoring by quarter: 19-17, 16-20, 19-15, 27-23
Pts: Lauren Whittaker 18; Rebs: Jaiden Haile 9 Asts: Inês Bettencourt 5	Pts: Eleonora Villa 22; Rebs: Tanja Valancic 6 Asts: Mackenzie Chatfield 6

Beasley Coliseum
Pullman, WA
Attendance: 1,470
Referees: Robert Scofield, Kevin Kizewski, Clifford Sims

=== at San Diego ===
Broadcasters: Braden Surprenant and Alex Miniak

Series history: Washington State leads 6-0
Starting lineups:

- Washington State: #2 Eleonora Villa, #8 Mackenzie Chatfield, #9 Tanja Valancic, #10 Charlotte Abraham, #33 Alex Covill
- San Diego: #3 Lilly Amor, #6 Kylie Ray, #10 Helen Holley, #15 Eva Ruse, #24 Olivia Owens

ESPN+

Feb. 5
6 p.m. PDT

Recap

Washington State Cougars 80, San Diego Toreros 76
Scoring by quarter: 25-19, 18-21, 22-23, 15-13
Pts: Malia Ruud 19; Rebs: Mackenzie Chatfield 7 Asts: Tanja Valancic, Eleonora Villa 5	Pts: Olivia Owens 31; Rebs: Olivia Owens 12; Asts: Olivia Owens 6

Jenny Craig Pavilion
San Diego, CA
Attendance: 922
Referees: Dominique Harris, Mjumbe Williams, Richard Waters

=== at Pepperdine ===
Broadcasters: Joey Vergilis and Victoria Dennis

Series history: Washington State leads 5-1
Starting lineups:

- Washington State: #2 Eleonora Villa, #8 Mackenzie Chatfield, #9 Tanja Valancic, #10 Charlotte Abraham, #33 Alex Covill
- Pepperdine: #1 Taija Sta. Maria, #2 Elli Guiney, #12 Shorna Preston, #13 Meghan Fiso, #22 Lina Falk

ESPN+

Feb. 7
1 p.m. PDT

Recap

Washington State Cougars 62, Pepperdine Waves 78
Scoring by quarter: 11-19, 15-23, 17-19, 19-17
Pts: Charlotte Abraham 15; Rebs: Tanja Valancic 7 Asts: Mackenzie Chatfield 8	Pts: Lina Falk 19; Rebs: Shorna Preston 11; Asts: Taija Sta. Maria 6

Firestone Fieldhouse
Malibu, CA
Attendance: 370
Referees: Deon Lewis, Chaka Wade, Devorah Robinson-Ashe

=== Portland ===
Broadcasters: Trevor Williams and Stephanie Freeman

Series history: Portland leads 10-2
Starting lineups:

- Portland: #2 Dyani Ananiev, #3 Florence Dallow, #9 Jada Kennedy, #20 Lainey Spear, #22 Rhyan Mogel
- Washington State: #2 Eleonora Villa, #8 Mackenzie Chatfield, #9 Tanja Valancic, #10 Charlotte Abraham, #33 Alex Covill

ESPN+

Feb. 12
6 p.m. PDT

Recap

Portland Pilots 68, Washington State Cougars 61
Scoring by quarter: 2-14, 29-13, 22-17, 15-17
Pts: Rhyan Mogel 20; Rebs: Jada Kennedy 9 Asts: Lainey Spear 5	Pts: Charlotte Abraham 18; Rebs: Charlotte Abraham 8 Asts: Eleonora Villa 7

Beasley Coliseum
Pullman, WA
Attendance: 905
Referees: Brian Woods, Rochelle Bennett, Maggie DeWall

=== at Gonzaga ===
Broadcasters: Greg Heister and Stephanie Freeman

Series history: Washington State leads 22-14
Starting lineups:

- Washington State: #2 Eleonora Villa, #8 Mackenzie Chatfield, #9 Charlotte Abraham, #33 Alex Covill, #55 Malia Ruud
- Gonzaga: #8 Ines Betancourt, #11 Allie Turner, #20 Taylor Smith, #33 Lauren Whittaker, #55 Zeryhia Aokuso

ESPN+

Feb. 19
6 p.m. PDT

Recap

Washington State Cougars 50, Gonzaga Bulldogs 75
Scoring by quarter: 8-17, 15-21, 18-24, 9-13
Pts: Eleonora Villa 13; Rebs: Charlotte Abraham 8 Asts: Eleonora Villa 5	Pts: Ines Betancourt 16; Rebs: Jaiden Haile, Lauren Whittaker 11; Asts: Taylor Smith 4

McCarthey Athletic Center
Spokane, WA
Attendance: 5,193
Referees: Steve Belnap, Teresa Turner, Darren Krzesnik

=== at Oregon State ===
Broadcasters: Ann Schatz and Mary Murphy

Series history: Oregon State leads 61-37
Starting lineups:

- Washington State: #2 Eleonora Villa, #8 Mackenzie Chatfield, #9 Tanja Valancic, #10 Charlotte Abraham, #33 Alex Covill
- Oregon State: #0 Tiara Bolden, #1 Kennedie Shuler, #3 Jenna Villa, #4 Ally Schimel, #15 Lizzy Williamson

ESPN+

Feb. 21
1 p.m. PDT

Recap

Washington State Cougars 51, Oregon State Beavers 79
Scoring by quarter: 10-21, 19-26, 12-16, 10-16
Pts: Alex Covill 15; Rebs: Charlotte Abraham 7 Asts: Eleonora Villa 4	Pts: Kennedie Shuler, Jenna Villa 20; Rebs: Lizzy Williamson 10; Asts: Kennedie Shuler 4

Gill Coliseum
Corvallis, OR
Attendance: 4,473
Referees: Davorah Robinson-Ashe, Johnny Mendez Jr., Corey Long

=== Seattle ===
Broadcasters: Trevor Williams and Mary Murphy

Series history: Washington State leads 11-2
Starting lineups:

- Seattle: #3 Ella Brubaker, #7 Lucija Milkovic, #8 Chloe Emanga, #9 Jana Vesic, #14 Tamia Stricklin
- Washington State: #2 Eleonora Villa, #8 Mackenzie Chatfield, #9 Tanja Valancic, #10 Charlotte Abraham, #33 Alex Covill

ESPN+

Feb. 26
6 p.m. PDT

Recap

Seattle Redhawks 55, Washington State Cougars 69
Scoring by quarter: 9-21, 13-8, 15-24, 18-16
Pts: Ella Brubaker 17; Rebs: Chloe Emanga, Tamia Stricklin 9 Asts: Andjela Bigovic 3	Pts: Alex Covill 18; Rebs: Eleonora Villa, Mackenzie Chatfield, Alex Covill 7 Asts: Mackenzie Chatfield 7

Beasley Coliseum
Pullman, WA
Attendance: 939
Referees: Michal Ann Ure, Karen Lasuik, Benny Luna

=== Saint Mary's ===
Broadcasters: Trevor Williams and Mary Murphy

Series history: Saint Mary's leads 7-6
Starting lineups:

- Saint Mary's: #2 Amy Kurkowski, #4 Charlece Ohiaeri, #5 Abigail Shoff, #13 Malia Latu, #23 Addi Wedin
- Washington State: #2 Eleonora Villa, #8 Mackenzie Chatfield, #9 Tanja Valancic, #10 Charlotte Abraham, #33 Alex Covill

ESPN+

Feb. 28
12 p.m. PDT

Recap

Saint Mary's Gaels 50, Washington State Cougars 57
Scoring by quarter: 8-9, 12-20, 18-13, 12-15
Pts: Melesungu Afeaki 11; Rebs: Abigail Shoff 6 Asts: Abigail Shoff 2	Pts: Eleonora Villa 13; Rebs: Alex Covill 8 Asts: Mackenzie Chatfield 4

Beasley Coliseum
Pullman, WA
Attendance: 1,215
Referees: Richard Waters, Kaili Kimura, Taylor Mink

=== vs. Seattle (WCC Tournament - First Round) ===
Broadcasters: Ann Schatz, Jennifer Mountain and Mariluz Cook

Series history: Washington State leads 12-2
Starting lineups:

- Seattle: #3 Ella Brubaker, #6 Andjela Bigovic, #8 Chloe Emanga, #9 Jana Vesic, #14 Tamia Stricklin
- Washington State: #2 Eleonora Villa, #8 Mackenzie Chatfield, #9 Tanja Valancic, #10 Charlotte Abraham, #33 Alex Covill

ESPN+

Mar. 5
12 p.m. PDT

Recap

Seattle Redhawks 58, Washington State Cougars 80
Scoring by quarter: 17-17, 15-27, 12-17, 14-19
Pts: Tamia Stricklin 17; Rebs: Tamia Stricklin 11; Asts: Ella Brubaker 4	Pts: Eleonora Villa 22; Rebs: Charlotte Abraham, Malia Ruud 7 Asts: Mackenzie Chatfield 5

Orleans Arena
Las Vegas, NV
Referees: Danielle Johnson, Tyler Trimble, Sean Martin

=== vs. Pacific (WCC Tournament - Second Round) ===
Broadcasters: Ann Schatz, Jennifer Mountain and Mariluz Cook

Series history: Washington State leads 5-3
Starting lineups:

- Washington State: #2 Eleonora Villa, #8 Mackenzie Chatfield, #9 Tanja Valancic, #10 Charlotte Abraham, #33 Alex Covill
- Pacific: #5 Stella Szabo, #8 Sophia Mindermann, #9 Marina Radocaj, #10 Sydney Ward, #21 Daria Nestorov

ESPN+

Mar. 6
12 p.m. PDT

Recap

Washington State Cougars 82, Pacific Tigers 76
Scoring by quarter: 19-8, 18-10, 22-27, 23-31
Pts: Eleonora Villa 22; Rebs: Malia Ruud 9 Asts: Eleonora Villa 7	Pts: Sydney Ward 21; Rebs: Sydney Ward 10; Asts: Daria Nestorov 3

Orleans Arena
Las Vegas, NV
Attendance: 977
Referees: Brian Woods, Benny Luna, Juchell Wardlow

=== vs. Portland (WCC Tournament - Third Round) ===
Broadcasters: Ann Schatz, Jennifer Mountain and Mariluz Cook

Series history: Portland leads 11-2
Starting lineups:

- Washington State: #2 Eleonora Villa, #8 Mackenzie Chatfield, #9 Tanja Valancic, #10 Charlotte Abraham, #33 Alex Covill
- Portland: #2 Dyani Ananiev, #3 Florence Dallow, #17 Nicole Anderson, #20 Lainey Spear, #22 Rhyan Mogel

ESPN+

Mar. 7
12 p.m. PDT

Washington State Cougars 62, Portland Pilots 72
Scoring by quarter: 15-18, 15-15, 11-23, 21-16
Pts: Eleonora Villa 16; Rebs: Charlotte Abraham, Alex Covill 7 Asts: Marta Alsina 5	Pts: Rhyan Mogel 19; Rebs: Tiffany Barbosa 5 Asts: Rhyan Mogel 5

Orleans Arena
Las Vegas, NV
Attendance: 1,289
Referees: Richard Waters, Alecia Ann Murray, Danielle Johnson

== Rankings ==
Ranking movements
	Week																				
Poll	Pre	1	2	3	4	5	6	7	8	9	10	11	12	13	14	15	16	17	18	19	Final
AP																					
Coaches																					

== See also ==
- 2025–26 Washington State Cougars men's basketball team
