= 2012 Paradise Jam =

- Season: 2012–13
- Teams: 8
- Finals site: Sports and Fitness Center, Saint Thomas, U.S. Virgin Islands
- Champions: New Mexico (men's); Connecticut (women's Island); South Carolina (women's Reef)
- MVP: Kendall Williams, New Mexico (men's); Breanna Stewart, Connecticut (women's Island); Aleighsa Welch, South Carolina (women's Reef)

The 2012 Paradise Jam was an early-season men's and women's college basketball tournament. The tournament, which began in 2000, was part of the 2011–12 NCAA Division I men's basketball season and 2011–12 NCAA Division I women's basketball season. The tournament was played at the Sports and Fitness Center in Saint Thomas, U.S. Virgin Islands, New Mexico won the men's tournament, in the women's tournament Connecticut won the women's Island Division and South Carolina won the women's Reef Division.

== Men's tournament ==
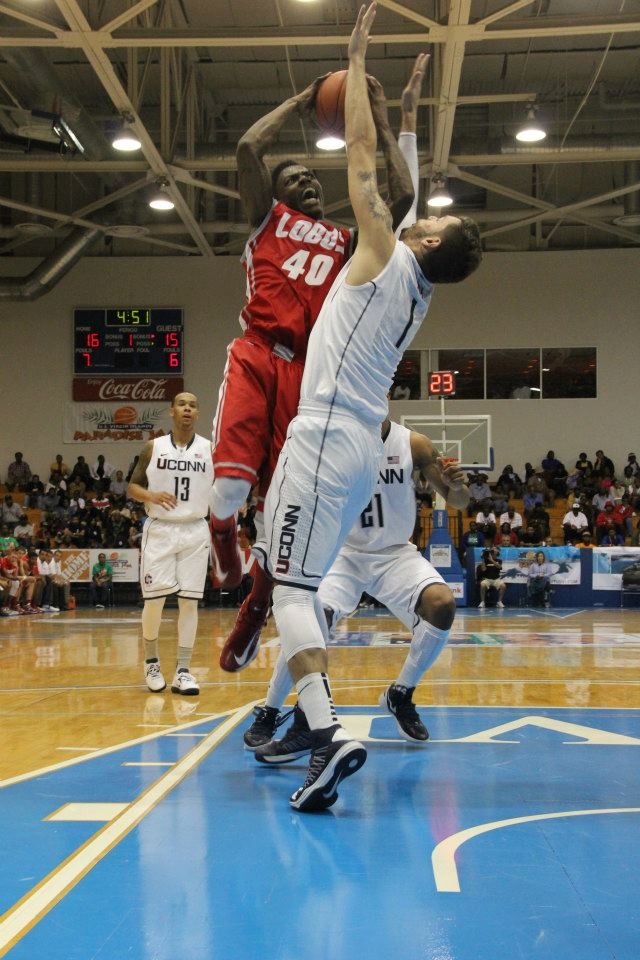
New Mexico's Demetrius Walker drives against Connecticut's Enosch Wolf at the 2012 Paradise Jam Championship game

The 2012 Paradise Jam featured some close games. ESPN predicted that UConn would face New Mexico in the finals, which did happen, but the results were far from ordained. In the first round, the largest victory was a seven-point win by New Mexico over the University of Illinois at Chicago. Connecticut beat Wake Forest by six, While George Mason, behind at the half, came back to win by three points over Mercer. However, the Quinnipiac – Iona game was tied at the half, and tied at the end of regulation. Despite scoring 13 points in overtime, Iona fell to Quinnipiac.

In the second round, the games were even closer. George Mason held a five-point lead over New Mexico with twelve seconds left, when the Lobos hit a three-pointer, then stole the ball and hit another three-pointer with under two seconds to play, to win by a single point. In the other match up, between two teams from the same state, UConn was down by double digits with five minutes to go, yet the game went to double-overtime before UConn won in the second overtime. In the title game, UConn came from nine points down to take a brief two-point lead with just over two minutes to go, but gave up nine straight points, and ended up with the loss 66–60. The Lobos hit all 21 of their free throw attempts in the game and went on to win the 2012 Paradise Jam Championship.

=== Bracket ===
* – Denotes overtime period

5th Place Game; November 19
UIC	86
Iona	81
7th Place Game
Mercer	71
Wake Forest	74

Consolation 2nd Round; November 18
Mercer	36
UIC	62
Wake Forest	68
Iona	94

First Round; November 16
Mercer	49
George Mason	52
UIC	59
New Mexico	66
Wake Forest	71
23	Connecticut	77
Quinnipiac	98*
Iona	92

Semifinals; November 18
George Mason	69
New Mexico	70
Connecticut	89**
Quinnipiac	83

Championship; November 19
New Mexico	66
21	Connecticut	60
3rd Place Game
George Mason	74
Quinnipiac	58

== Women's tournament ==
The woman's tournament is organized as two divisions of four teams, each playing each other in a round-robin format. First-round games were held on Thanksgiving Day 22 November, while the second and third-round games were held on Friday and Saturday, the 23rd and 24th.

=== Reef Division ===
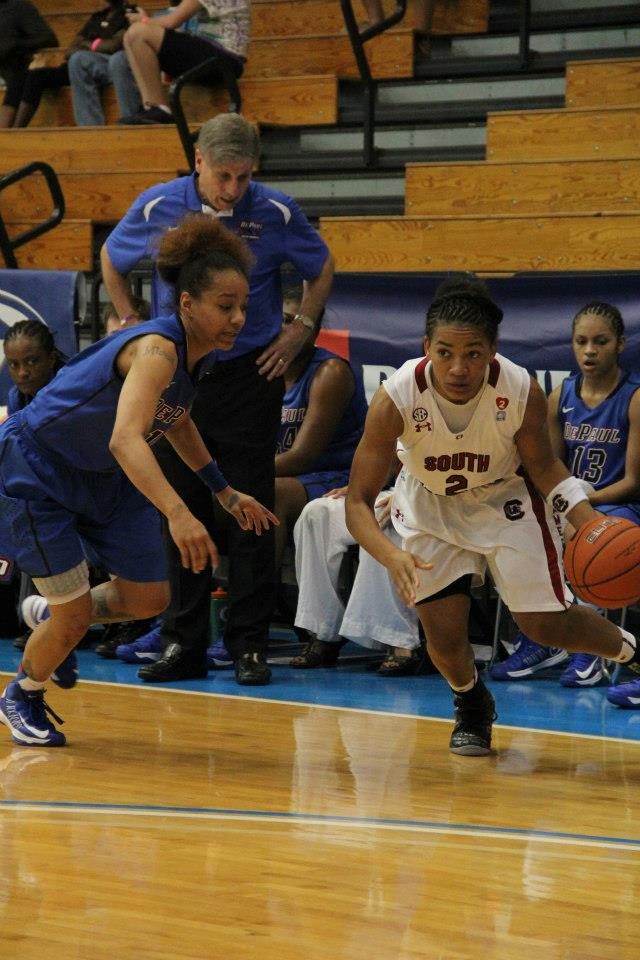
South Carolina's Ieasia Walker drives to the basket against DePaul's Brittany Hrynko, while Blue Demon coach Doug Bruno watches on at the 2012 Paradise Jam

In the Reef Division, DePaul was involved in two of the closest games. In their Thanksgiving match up with Florida Gulf Coast, despite twelve point leads in the first half, the Eagles were within one point at halftime. They briefly held a lead in the second half, but were behind by eight points with just over two minutes to go. They climbed back to within two, but could not take the lead, and lost 60–58. In their next game against Hampton, the Blue Demons fell behind by 13 with 14 minutes to go. They tied up the game with just over a minute to go. No one scored until the final seconds, when Anna Martin was fouled with three seconds to go in the game. She missed the first free throw, but hit the second, to secure the win for DePaul 68–67.

South Carolina won their first game against Hampton 45–34, and their second against Florida Gulf Coast 65–46, setting up the deciding game between the two 2–0 teams. South Carolina went on to win the game 55–46, which won the Reef Division championship. Aleighsa Welch of South Carolina was named the Reef Division MVP.

November 22
DePaul	68
Florida Gulf Coast	67

November 22
South Carolina	45
Hampton	34

November 23
Hampton	67
DePaul	68

November 23
Florida Gulf Coast	45
South Carolina	65

November 24
South Carolina	55
DePaul	46

November 24
Florida Gulf Coast	70
Hampton	59

=== Island division ===
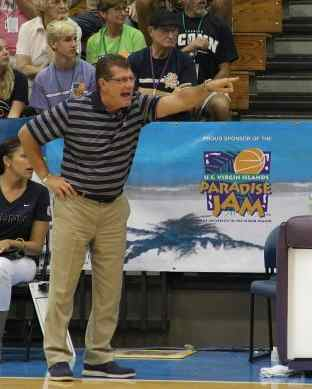
Geno Auriemma at 2012 Paradise Jam

The Island Division was dominated by Connecticut, Connecticut faced Wake Forest, but the game was never close. The Huskies scored the first twelve points, and extended the margin to a 45-12 halftime score. All players saw action, and the final score was 95–34 in favor of Connecticut, with the Huskies shooting almost 69% from the floor. Dolson hit her first career three point attempt, while Stewart led all scorers with 20 points.

In the second game of the Paradise Jam Tournament, UConn met Marist. UConn opened in full court pressure, which helped to open up a 22-9 early lead. Then the Huskies went on an 18–0 run to extend the lead. Breanna Stewart scored 20 points and recorded 10 rebounds for her first career double-double. Connecticut went on to win 81–39. The win represented the 48th consecutive in-season tournament win, a streak extending back to 1992.

Connecticut faced 14th ranked Purdue in the finals of the Paradise Jam Tournament. Each team entered the final game with a 2–0 record. Purdue was successful beyond the arc, hitting 59% of their three-point attempts (13 of 22), but hit only six two point shots. UConn started out with an 11–0 run, and never trailed. UConn went on to win 91–57. Breanna Stewart a freshman for Connecticut was named tournament MVP, (the first time freshman to win the award other than Maya Moore in 2007). Kaleena Lewis was also named to the All-tournament team.

November 22
Connecticut	95
Wake Forest	34

November 22
Purdue	71
Marist	50

November 23
Marist	39
Connecticut	81

November 23
Wake Forest	53
Purdue	67

November 24
Marist	81
Wake Forest	66

November 24
Purdue	57
Connecticut	91
