= 2003 Paradise Jam =

- Season: 2003–04
- Teams: 6 (men's), 8 (women's)
- Finals site: Sports and Fitness Center, Saint Thomas, U.S. Virgin Islands
- Champions: Boston College (men's); Virginia Tech (women's Saint Thomas); Southwest Missouri State (women's Saint John)
- MVP: Craig Smith, Boston College (men's); Carrie Mason, Virginia Tech (women's Saint Thomas); Kari Koch, Southwest Missouri State (women's Saint John)

The 2003 Paradise Jam was an early-season men's and women's college basketball tournament. The tournament, which began in 2000, was part of the 2003–04 NCAA Division I men's basketball season and 2003–04 NCAA Division I women's basketball season. The tournament was played at the Sports and Fitness Center in Saint Thomas, U.S. Virgin Islands. Boston College won the men's tournament, in the women's tournament Virginia Tech won the Saint Thomas division, and Southwest Missouri State won the Saint John Division.

== Men's tournament ==
Teams were arranged into two divisions consisting of three teams. The teams in each division played each other in a round-robin format over the first three days. In the Championship round teams were seeded based on record and played in a fifth place game, third place game and championship game.

=== Saint Thomas Division ===
Monmouth faced Appalachian State in the first round. The game was close at halftime, with the Hawks holding a four-point margin. In the second half, each team scored 36, Monmouth won the game by four points, 69–65.

Appalachian State played Boston College. The Eagles outscored the Mountaineers by eleven in the first half and extended the lead in the second half, ending up with a 25-point win, 92–67.

Boston College faced Monmouth in the third round. Boston College out scored Monmouth by ten in the first half, holding the Hawks to 15 points. Monmouth scored 35 in the second half, but that was matched by Boston College so the final score remained a ten-point margin in favor of Boston College, 60–50.

November 21
Monmouth	69
Appalachian State	65

November 22
Appalachian State	67
Boston College	92

November 23
Boston College	60
Monmouth	50

=== Saint John division ===
Wichita State faced La Salle in the first round. Wichita State held a four-point lead at halftime. La Salle out scored Wichita State in the second half, but only by one point, so Wichita State won by three points 74–71.

Hampton faced La Salle in the second round. Hampton lead at halftime, and extended the lead to ten points, but the Explorers cut the lead, and it took four free throws by the Pirates in the final 21 seconds to preserve the win.

Wichita State faced Hampton in the third round. There were several lead changes in the first half, which closed with a five-point lead by Wichita State. The second half remained close, and Hampton cut the lead to a single point with 13 seconds left. After Wichita State hit one of two free throws, Hampton attempted to score, but the ball was tied up, and the possession arrow favored Wichita State. Hampton fouled Fridge Holman, who hit one of two free throws to extend the lead to three points. Hampton attempted a three-pointer in the final seconds, but failed to score, Wichita State won 68–65.

November 21
La Salle	71
Wichita State	74

November 22
Hampton	68
La Salle	64

November 23
Hampton	65
Wichita State	68

==== Championship round ====
In the fifth place game, The game was close at halftime, with Appalachian State holding a two-point lead. They extended the lead in the second, and ended up with an eleven-point win 59–48.

In the third-place game, Monmouth had a 21–0 run in the second half, over a period of twelve minutes. However, the two teams were tied at the end of regulation, and at the end of the first overtime. In the second overtime, Monmouth out scored Hampton by twelve to win 64–52.

In the Championship game, Boston College built an eleven-point lead in the first half, but the Shockers cut the lead to two by halftime. The second half remained close, but Jermaine Watson hit 11 of 12 free throws, including the final eight points to help Boston College claim the Championship 84–81. Craig Smith (Boston College) was named the Tournament's MVP.

November 24; Fifth Place game
Appalachian State	59
La Salle	48

November 24; Third Place game
Monmouth	64
Hampton	52

November 24; Championship
Boston College	84
Wichita State	81

== Women's tournament ==
Teams in the Saint Thomas division played in a 4 team tournament with a 3rd place game. Teams in the Saint John's division played a round-robin, with one game each between November 27 – 29.

=== Saint Thomas division ===
Virginia Tech faced Iowa State on Thanksgiving Day. Although the Hokies opened up a double-digit lead in the second half, the Cyclones cut the lead to only three points roughly midway through the second half. Virginia Tech hit nine out of 10 free-throw attempts in the final 2:30 to help preserve a 67–57 win.

Mississippi State played Indiana in the other Thanksgiving Day game and came away with an 70–67 win.

In the 3rd place game Iowa State defeated Indiana 75–59.

In the championship game, The game was tied with less than a minute to go when Erin Gibson tipped in a score to take a small lead for the Hokies. Mississippi State was forced to foul and Virginia Tech converted the free throws to win the championship 63–56.

Carrie Mason of Virginia Tech was awarded the MVP for the Saint Thomas division. The other five all-stars were Tiania Burns (Mississippi State), Jenny DeMuth (Indiana), Lisa Kriener (Iowa State), Ieva Kublina (Virginia Tech), and Tan White (Mississippi State).

==== Bracket ====
Semifinals; November 28
Virginia Tech	67
Iowa State	57
Mississippi State	70
Indiana	67

Championship; November 29
Virginia Tech	63
Mississippi State	56
3rd Place game November 29
Iowa State	75
Indiana	59

=== Saint John division ===
On Thanksgiving Day, Southwest Missouri State defeated West Virginia 82–64. Although the game was close early with several lead changes. the Lady Bears scored 13 consecutive points to close out the first half and take a 17-point lead into halftime. The Mountaineers were down by as many as 18 points in the second half tried to come back but never cut the margin to less than nine.

Georgia Tech faced James Madison in the second game. The Dukes had an eight nothing run in the second half to take a four-point lead, but the Yellow Jackets immediately responded with a 15–0 run to take a 10-point lead. Georgia Tech closed the game hitting a consecutive eight free-throw attempts to win 60–53.

On Friday, the 28th, West Virginia defeated Georgia Tech 75–61. Kate Bulger (West Virginia), was the leading scorer with 21 points. Southwest Missouri State played James Madison and won with exactly the same score of the game on the preceding day 82–64.

On the final day of the tournament West Virginia defeated James Madison 89–63. The Mountaineers hit 56% of their shots from the floor and out rebounded the Dukes 37–16. Georgia Tech took on Southwest Missouri State and won, 78–71.

Kari Koch (Southwest Missouri State) was named the MVP of the division. The other all-stars included Kate Bulger (West Virginia), Lesley Dickinson (James Madison), Jenni Lingor (Southwest Missouri State), Alex Stewart (Georgia Tech), and Fallon Stokes (Georgia Tech).

November 27
Southwest Missouri State	82
West Virginia	64

November 27
Georgia Tech	69
James Madison	53

November 28
Georgia Tech	65
West Virginia	71

November 28
Southwest Missouri State	82
James Madison	64

November 28
James Madison	63
West Virginia	89

November 28
Georgia Tech	78
Southwest Missouri State	71

*Georgia Tech, Southwest Missouri State, and West Virginia tied with 2–1 records. The tiebreaker was scores against all opponents, Southwest Missouri State was declared champions of the Saint John Division, West Virginia finished second, Georgia Tech third.
