= 2018 Paradise Jam =

- Season: 2018–19
- Teams: 8
- Finals site: Sports and Fitness Center, Saint Thomas, U.S. Virgin Islands
- Champions: Kansas State (men's); Kentucky (women's Island); UConn (women's Reef)
- MVP: Dean Wade, Kansas State (men's); Rhyne Howard, Kentucky (women's Island); Napheesa Collier, UConn (women's Reef)

The 2018 Paradise Jam was an early-season men's and women's college basketball tournament. The tournament, which began in 2000, was part of the 2018–19 NCAA Division I men's basketball season and 2018–19 NCAA Division I women's basketball season. After a year's absence due to major damage to the Virgin Islands from Hurricane Irma and Hurricane Maria, the tournament returned to the Sports and Fitness Center in Saint Thomas, U.S. Virgin Islands, Kansas State won the men's tournament, in the women's tournament Kentucky won the Island Division and UConn won the Reef Division.

== Men's tournament ==
=== Bracket ===
5th Place Game; November 19
Old Dominion	53
Northern Iowa	54
7th Place Game
Kennesaw State	81
Eastern Kentucky	100

Consolation 2nd Round; November 17
Old Dominion	65
Kennesaw State	47
Northern Iowa	90
Eastern Kentucky	85

First Round; November 16
Oregon State	61
Old Dominion	56
Kennesaw State	52
Missouri	55
Northern Iowa	71
Penn	78
Eastern Kentucky	68
12	Kansas State	95

Semifinals; November 17
Oregon State	63
Missouri	69
Penn	48
12	Kansas State	64

Championship; November 19
Missouri	67
12	Kansas State	82
3rd Place Game
Oregon State	74
Penn	58

== Women's tournament ==
The women's tournament will be played from November 22–24. The women's tournament consists of 8 teams split into two 4-team, round-robin divisions: Island and Reef.

=== Island Division ===
Pos	Team	Pld	W	L	PF	PA	PD	PCT
1	Kentucky (C)	3	3	0	245	212	+33	1.000
2	North Carolina	3	2	1	230	203	+27	.667
3	South Florida	3	1	2	192	212	−20	.333
4	UCLA	3	0	3	179	219	−40	.000

(C) Champions

==== Results ====
November 22
2:00 p.m.

Recap

Kentucky 85, South Florida 63

November 22
4:00 p.m.

Box score

North Carolina 84, UCLA 49
Scoring by quarter: 25–19, 19–11, 23–12, 16–7

Attendance: 874
Referees: Denise Brooks, Tiara Cruse, Saif Esho

November 23
2:00 p.m.

Box score

UCLA 74, Kentucky 75 (OT)
Scoring by quarter: 15–14, 16–27, 14–6, 21–19, Overtime: 8–9
Pts: Michaela Oyenwere (28); Rebs: Lajahna Drummer (10); Asts: Kennedy Burke (3)	Pts: Rhyne Howard (20); Rebs: Howard, Maci Morris (7); Asts: Taylor Murray (3)

Referees: Mark Resch, Katie Lukanich, Ed Sidlasky

November 23
4:00 p.m.

Box score

South Florida 69, North Carolina 71
Scoring by quarter: 20–16, 11–19, 20–23, 18–13
Pts: Laura Ferreira (22); Rebs: Tamara Henshaw (7); Asts: Ferriera (7)	Pts: Stephanie Watts (24); Rebs: Janelle Bailey (7); Asts: Shayla Bennett (3)

Attendance: 715
Referees: Cissoko-Stevens Fatou, Tommi Parris, Barb Smith

November 24
2:00 p.m.

Box score

North Carolina 85, Kentucky 75
Scoring by quarter: 25–23, 22–15, 13–16, 15–31
Pts: Stephanie Watts (27); Rebs: Taylor Koenen (11); Asts: Shayla Bennett (4)	Pts: Rhyne Howard (25); Rebs: Howard (12); Asts: Taylor Murray (10)

Referees: Barb Smith, Tiara Cruse, Saif Esho

November 24
4:00 p.m.

Box score

South Florida 60, UCLA 56
Scoring by quarter: 6–9, 25–9, 16–20, 13–18
Pts: Sydni Harvey (19); Rebs: Team (10); Asts: Elisa Pinzan (5)	Pts: Japreece Dean (17); Rebs: Lajahna Drummer (9); Asts: Dean (5)

Attendance: 814
Referees: Denise Brooks, Geraldine Smith, Jennifer White

==== Island Division All-Tournament team ====
- Rhyne Howard, Kentucky
- Kennedy Burke, UCLA
- Sydni Harvey, South Florida
- Taylor Murray, Kentucky
- Stephanie Watts, North Carolina

=== Reef Division ===
November 22
UConn	90
Ole Miss	50

November 22
Purdue	62
St. John's	68

November 23
Ole Miss	59
Purdue	70

November 23
St. John's	55
UConn	65

November 24
Purdue	40
UConn	86

November 24
Ole Miss	59
St. John's	64

==== Reef Division All-Tournament team ====
- Napheesa Collier, Connecticut
- Crystal Allen, Ole Miss
- Tiana England, St. John's
- Ae’Rianna Harris, Purdue
- Katie Lou Samuelson, Connecticut
