= UVI Sports and Fitness Center =

Indoor arena in the US Virgin Islands

Coordinates: 18.340096°N 64.97306°W

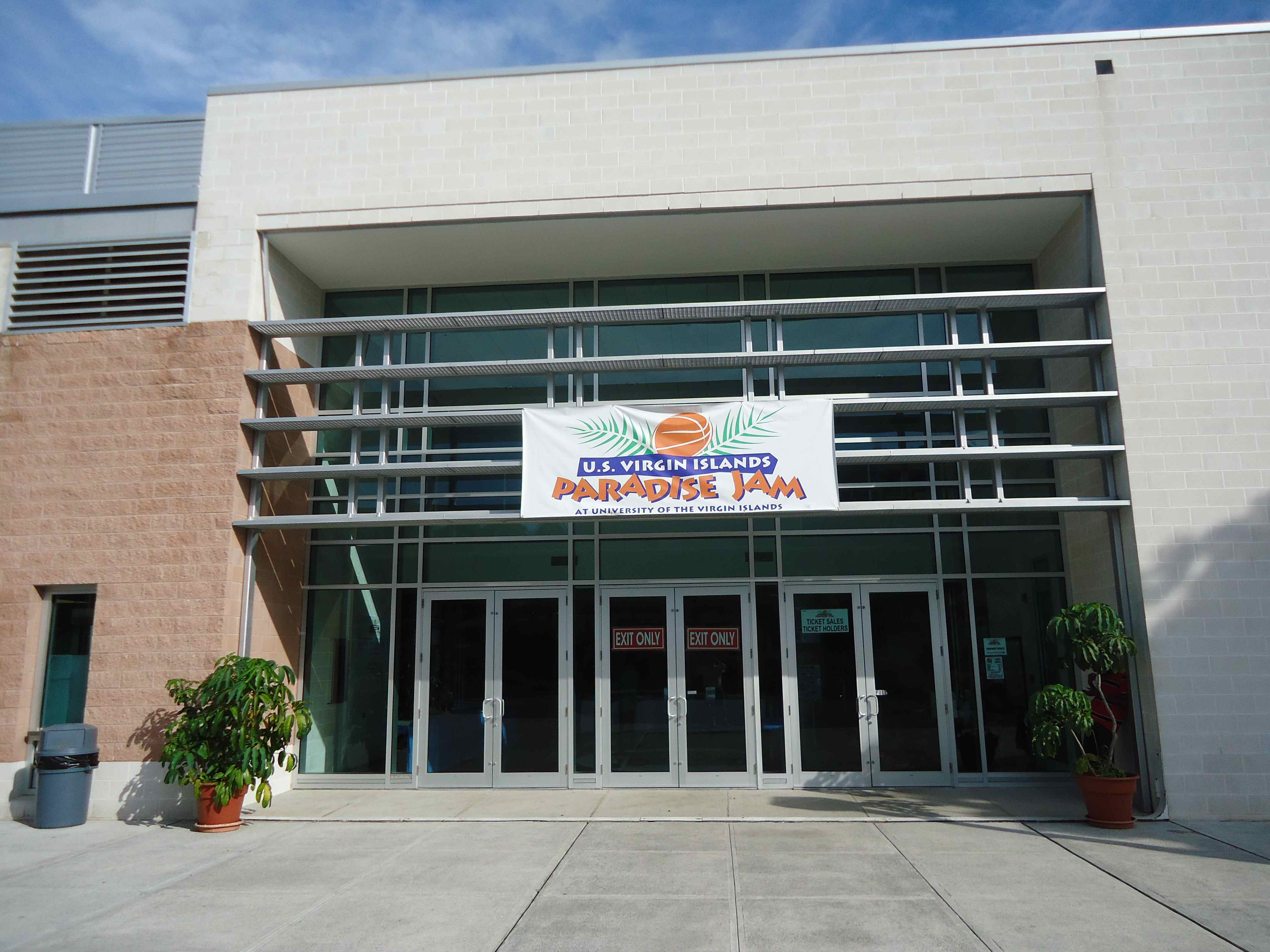
Elridge Wilburn Blake Sports and Fitness Center

The Elridge Wilburn Blake Sports and Fitness Center is an indoor sporting arena located in Charlotte Amalie West, Saint Thomas, United States Virgin Islands. It is on the Orville E. Kean Campus of the University of the Virgin Islands and is the home for both the Buccaneers men's and Lady Buccaneers women's basketball teams. The capacity of the arena is 3,000 people (the largest on the island).

It serves as the host venue for the United States Virgin Islands Paradise Jam, an in-season college basketball exempt multiple-team event (MTE) tournament.
