= 2018–19 Northwestern Wildcats women's basketball team =

Intercollegiate basketball season

2018–19 Northwestern Wildcats women's basketball

WNIT, Runner Up
- Conference: Big Ten Conference
- Record: 21–15 (9–9 Big Ten)
- Head coach: Joe McKeown (11th season)
- Assistant coaches: Kate Popovec; Preston Reid; Tangela Smith
- Home arena: Welsh–Ryan Arena

2018–19 Big Ten women's basketball standings
	Conf.				Overall
Team	W		L	PCT	W		L	PCT
No. 9 Maryland	15	–	3	.833	29	–	5	.853
No. 8 Iowa †	14	–	4	.778	29	–	7	.806
Rutgers	13	–	5	.722	22	–	10	.688
Michigan	11	–	7	.611	22	–	12	.647
Ohio State	10	–	8	.556	14	–	15	.483
Minnesota	9	–	9	.500	21	–	11	.656
Michigan State	9	–	9	.500	21	–	12	.636
Northwestern	9	–	9	.500	21	–	15	.583
Nebraska	9	–	9	.500	14	–	16	.467
Indiana	8	–	10	.444	21	–	13	.618
Purdue	8	–	10	.444	19	–	15	.559
Penn State	5	–	13	.278	12	–	18	.400
Wisconsin	4	–	14	.222	15	–	18	.455
Illinois	2	–	16	.111	10	–	20	.333
† 2019 Big Ten tournament winner Rankings from AP poll

The 2018–19 Northwestern Wildcats women's basketball team represented Northwestern University during the 2018–19 NCAA Division I women's basketball season. The Wildcats were led by 11th-year head coach Joe McKeown. They returned to play their home games at Welsh–Ryan Arena after a one year renovation. They were members of the Big Ten Conference.

== Roster ==
2018–19 Northwestern Wildcats women's basketball team
Players
Coaches

Pos.	#	Name	Height	Year	Previous school	Hometown
G	0	Jess Sancataldo	6 ft 0 in (1.83 m)	Fr	Turamurra	Sydney, Australia
G	2	Lauryn Satterwhite	5 ft 7 in (1.7 m)	RS Fr	Valley Vista	Avondale, AZ
G	3	Sydney Wood	5 ft 11 in (1.8 m)	Fr	St. John's College	Olney, MD
F	4	Bryana Hopkins	6 ft 2 in (1.88 m)	Jr	William Fremd	Palatine, IL
G	10	Lindsey Pulliam (C)	5 ft 10 in (1.78 m)	So	Our Lady of Good Counsel	Silver Spring, MD
G	11	Brooke Pikiell	5 ft 10 in (1.78 m)	So	Rutgers Prep	Far Hills, NJ
G	12	Veronica Burton	5 ft 9 in (1.75 m)	Fr	Newton South	Newton, MA
F	14	Pallas Kunaiyi-Akpannah (C)	6 ft 2 in (1.88 m)	Sr	Rabun Gap-Nacoochee School	Abuja, Nigeria
F	15	Courtney Shaw	6 ft 0 in (1.83 m)	Fr	Perry Hall	Perry Hall, MD
F/C	21	Abbie Wolf	6 ft 4 in (1.93 m)	Jr	Greenwich	White Plains, NY
G	22	Byrdy Galernik	5 ft 8 in (1.73 m)	Jr	Toledo Central Catholic	Perrysburg, OH
G	24	Jordan Hamilton	5 ft 8 in (1.73 m)	So	Liberty	Frisco, TX
F	32	Amber Jamison	6 ft 0 in (1.83 m)	RS Jr	Rochester Adams	Rochester Hills, MI
F/C	44	Aby Scheid (C)	6 ft 2 in (1.88 m)	Jr	Elk River	Elk River, MN

Head coach

- Joe McKeown (Mercer)

Assistant coach(es)

- Kate Popovec (Northwestern)
- Preston Reid (Ball State)
- Tangela Smith (Iowa)

Legend

- (C) Team captain
- (S) Suspended
- (I) Ineligible
- (W) Walk-on
- Injured
- Current redshirt

Roster

== Schedule and results ==
Date time, TV	Rank^{#}	Opponent^{#}	Result	Record	Site (attendance) city, state
Exhibition
11/04/2018*; 2:00 pm		Lewis	W 84–69		Welsh–Ryan Arena (350); Evanston, IL
Non-conference regular season
11/06/2018*; 7:00 pm		at Green Bay	W 57–55	1–0	Kress Events Center (1,662); Green Bay, WI
11/11/2018*; 1:00 pm, BTN		No. 21 Duke	W 84–58	2–0	Welsh–Ryan Arena (2,258); Evanston, IL
11/15/2018*; 7:00 pm		UIC	W 87–44	3–0	Welsh–Ryan Arena (761); Evanston, IL
11/18/2018*; 1:00 pm		at Florida	W 83–74 ^{OT}	4–0	O'Connell Center (1,379); Gainesville, FL
11/25/2018*; 2:00 pm		UT Martin	W 90–64	5–0	Welsh–Ryan Arena (372); Evanston, IL
11/29/2018*; 7:00 pm		Pittsburgh; ACC–Big Ten Women's Challenge	L 49–52	5–1	Welsh–Ryan Arena (411); Evanston, IL
12/05/2018*; 7:00 pm		at No. 20 DePaul	L 60–76	5–2	McGrath-Phillips Arena (1,518); Chicago, IL
12/09/2018*; 1:00 pm, BTN		No. 18 Marquette	L 57–76	5–3	Welsh–Ryan Arena (1,467); Evanston, IL
12/17/2018*; 11:00 am		Chicago State	W 97–35	6–3	Welsh–Ryan Arena (5,799); Evanston, IL
12/19/2018*; 7:00 pm		vs. Wichita State; Duel in the Desert Desert Division semifinals	W 65–43	7–3	Cox Pavilion (952); Paradise, NV
12/20/2018*; 7:00 pm		vs. Kansas; Duel in the Desert Desert Division championship game	L 57–66	7–4	Cox Pavilion (751); Paradise, NV
Big Ten regular season
12/28/2018; 3:00 pm		at Rutgers	L 41–45	7–5 (0–1)	Louis Brown Athletic Center (1,952); Piscataway, NJ
12/31/2018; 2:00 pm, BTN		Illinois	W 68–45	8–5 (1–1)	Welsh–Ryan Arena (1,129); Evanston, IL
01/03/2019; 7:00 pm		No. 15 Michigan State	W 70–62	9–5 (2–1)	Welsh–Ryan Arena (1,071); Evanston, IL
01/08/2019; 6:00 pm		at Michigan	L 78–79 ^{OT}	9–6 (2–2)	Crisler Center (2,229); Ann Arbor, MI
01/13/2019; 4:00 pm, BTN		Purdue	L 54–57	9–7 (2–3)	Welsh–Ryan Arena (1,349); Evanston, IL
01/16/2019; 6:00 pm		at No. 25 Indiana	W 75–69	10–7 (3–3)	Simon Skjodt Assembly Hall (3,352); Bloomington, IN
01/20/2019; 3:30 pm		Wisconsin	W 72–46	11–7 (4–3)	Welsh–Ryan Arena (1,524); Evanston, IL
01/24/2019; 7:00 pm		at Nebraska	W 58–54	12–7 (5–3)	Pinnacle Bank Arena (3,660); Lincoln, NE
01/27/2019; 2:00 pm		at Illinois	W 64–56	13–7 (6–3)	State Farm Center (1,532); Champaign, IL
01/31/2019; 7:00 pm		Minnesota	L 54–61	13–8 (6–4)	Welsh–Ryan Arena (606); Evanston, IL
02/03/2019; 3:30 pm		Ohio State	W 76–59	14–8 (7–4)	Welsh–Ryan Arena (1,283); Evanston, IL
02/07/2019; 5:30 pm		at No. 10 Maryland	L 57–72	14–9 (7–5)	Xfinity Center (4,933); College Park, MD
02/10/2019; 1:00 pm, BTN		at Minnesota	L 64–73	14–10 (7–6)	Williams Arena (5,475); Lincoln, NE
02/14/2019; 7:00 pm		Penn State	W 78–63	15–10 (8–6)	Welsh–Ryan Arena (490); Evanston, IL
02/17/2019; 5:00 pm, BTN		at Purdue	L 58–61	15–11 (8–7)	Mackey Arena (7,265); West Lafayette, IN
02/21/2019; 7:00 pm		Nebraska	L 64–71	15–12 (8–8)	Welsh–Ryan Arena (446); Evanston, IL
02/26/2019; 7:00 pm		Indiana	W 69–49	16–12 (9–8)	Welsh–Ryan Arena (531); Evanston, IL
03/03/2019; 3:00 pm, BTN		at No. 12 Iowa	L 50–74	16–13 (9–9)	Carver–Hawkeye Arena (12,051); Iowa City, IA
Big Ten Women's Tournament
03/07/2019; 11:00 am, BTN	(8)	vs. (9) Michigan State; Second Round	L 52–68	16–14	Bankers Life Fieldhouse; Indianapolis, IN
WNIT
03/21/2019*; 7:00 pm		Dayton; First Round	W 74–51	17–14	Welsh–Ryan Arena (325); Evanston, IL
03/24/2019*; 1:00 pm, ESPN3		at Toledo; Second Round	W 54–47	18–14	Savage Arena (1,879); Toledo, OH
03/27/2019*; 7:00 pm		at West Virginia; Third Round	W 56–54	19–14	WVU Coliseum (1,314); Morgantown, WV
03/30/2019*; 6:00 pm		Ohio; Quarterfinals	W 61–58	20–14	Welsh–Ryan Arena (1,031); Evanston, IL
04/03/2019*; 6:00 pm		at James Madison; Semifinals	W 74–69	21–14	JMU Convocation Center (1,992); Harrisonburg, VA
04/06/2019*; 2:00 pm, CBSSN		at Arizona; Championship Game	L 42–56	21–15	McKale Center (14,644); Tucson, AZ
*Non-conference game. ^{#}Rankings from AP Poll. (#) Tournament seedings in parentheses. All times are in Central Time.

== Rankings ==
Regular season polls
Poll	Pre- Season	Week 2	Week 3	Week 4	Week 5	Week 6	Week 7	Week 8	Week 9	Week 10	Week 11	Week 12	Week 13	Week 14	Week 15	Week 16	Week 17	Week 18	Week 19	Final
AP		RV	RV	RV	RV															
Coaches			RV	RV																

Legend
	Increase in ranking
	Decrease in ranking
	Not ranked previous week
(RV)	Received Votes

== See also ==
2018–19 Northwestern Wildcats men's basketball team
