= 2018–19 Wisconsin Badgers women's basketball team =

Intercollegiate basketball season

2018–19 Wisconsin Badgers women's basketball
- Conference: Big Ten Conference
- Record: 15–18 (4–14 Big Ten)
- Head coach: Jonathan Tsipis (3rd season)
- Assistant coaches: Craig Carter; Myia Johnson; Kayla Tetschlag
- Home arena: Kohl Center

2018–19 Big Ten women's basketball standings
	Conf.				Overall
Team	W		L	PCT	W		L	PCT
No. 9 Maryland	15	–	3	.833	29	–	5	.853
No. 8 Iowa †	14	–	4	.778	29	–	7	.806
Rutgers	13	–	5	.722	22	–	10	.688
Michigan	11	–	7	.611	22	–	12	.647
Ohio State	10	–	8	.556	14	–	15	.483
Minnesota	9	–	9	.500	21	–	11	.656
Michigan State	9	–	9	.500	21	–	12	.636
Northwestern	9	–	9	.500	21	–	15	.583
Nebraska	9	–	9	.500	14	–	16	.467
Indiana	8	–	10	.444	21	–	13	.618
Purdue	8	–	10	.444	19	–	15	.559
Penn State	5	–	13	.278	12	–	18	.400
Wisconsin	4	–	14	.222	15	–	18	.455
Illinois	2	–	16	.111	10	–	20	.333
† 2019 Big Ten tournament winner Rankings from AP poll

The 2018–19 Wisconsin Badgers women's basketball team represented the University of Wisconsin–Madison during the 2018–19 NCAA Division I women's basketball season. The Badgers, led by third-year head coach Jonathan Tsipis, played their home games at the Kohl Center as members of the Big Ten Conference. They finished the season 15–18, 4–14 in Big Ten play to finish in 13th place. They advanced to the quarterfinals of the Big Ten women's tournament where they lost to Michigan.

== Previous season ==
The Badgers finished the 2017–18 season 9–21, including 2–14 in Big Ten play to finish in 13th place. They lost in the first round of the Big Ten women's tournament to Northwestern.

== Roster ==
2018–19 Wisconsin Badgers women's basketball team
Players
Coaches

Pos.	#	Name	Height	Year	Previous school	Hometown
F	2	Kelly Karlis	6 ft 2 in (1.88 m)	RS Sr	Montini Catholic; Ohio	Medinah, IL
G	3	Suzanne Gilreath	5 ft 4 in (1.63 m)	Jr	Fridley	Brooklyn Park, MN
G	10	Kendra Van Leeuwen	5 ft 10 in (1.78 m)	Jr	St. John's College (ON)	Brantford, ON
F	11	Marsha Howard	6 ft 0 in (1.83 m)	Sr	Crete Monee	Chicago, IL
F	12	Carmen Backes (redshirt)	6 ft 0 in (1.83 m)	Fr	Chisago Lakes	Lindstrom, MN
F	13	Sydney Mathiason (W)	6 ft 1 in (1.85 m)	Fr	Monroe	Monroe, WI
F	14	Abby Laszewski	6 ft 3 in (1.91 m)	Jr	Avon	Hartford, CT
G	15	Lexy Richardson	5 ft 9 in (1.75 m)	RS Sr	Verona Area	Verona, WI
G	20	Diamond Bragg	5 ft 9 in (1.75 m)	Fr	Camp Hill	Camp Hill, PA
G	22	Niya Beverley	5 ft 7 in (1.7 m)	So	St. John's College (DC)	Laurel, MD
G	23	Jasmine Hale	5 ft 9 in (1.75 m)	Fr	West Clermont	Cincinnati, OH
G	30	Kara Crowley (W)	5 ft 10 in (1.78 m)	So	Beaver Dam	Beaver Dam, WI
F	33	Courtney Fredrickson (redshirt)	6 ft 2 in (1.88 m)	So	Minnetonka	Excelsior, MN
F	34	Imani Lewis	6 ft 1 in (1.85 m)	Fr	Life Center Academy	Willingboro, NJ
F	43	Grace Mueller	6 ft 2 in (1.88 m)	RS So	Verona Area	Madison, WI
G	44	Alex Luehring	6 ft 2 in (1.88 m)	RS Fr	Vernona; Green Bay	Verona, WI

Head coach

- Jonathan Tsipis (North Carolina)

Assistant coach(es)

- Craig Carter (Rutgers)
- Myia McCurdy-Johnson (Rutgers)
- Kayla Tetschlag (Green Bay)

Legend

- (C) Team captain
- (S) Suspended
- (I) Ineligible
- (W) Walk-on
- Injured
- Current redshirt

Roster

== Recruiting class ==
College recruiting information
Name	Hometown	School	Height	Weight	Commit date
Sydney Hilliard; PG	Monroe, Wisconsin	Monroe High School (Wisconsin)	5 ft 11 in (1.80 m)	N/A	
Sydney Hilliard; PG	Recruit ratings: ESPN: (90)				
Julie Pospilisova; SF	Prague, Czechoslovakia	Downers Grove North High School	6 ft 1 in (1.85 m)	N/A	
Julie Pospilisova; SF	Recruit ratings: No ratings found				
Sara Stapleton; C	Blaine, Minnesota	Centennial High School (Minnesota)	6 ft 3 in (1.91 m)	N/A	
Sara Stapleton; C	Recruit ratings: ESPN: (90)				
Tara Stauffacher; SF	Columbus, Wisconsin	Beaver Dam High School (Wisconsin)	6 ft 0 in (1.83 m)	N/A	
Tara Stauffacher; SF	Recruit ratings: ESPN: (90)				
Overall recruit ranking:
Note: In many cases, Scout, Rivals, 247Sports, On3, and ESPN may conflict in their listings of height and weight.; In these cases, the average was taken. ESPN grades are on a 100-point scale.; Sources:

== Schedule and results ==
Date time, TV	Rank^{#}	Opponent^{#}	Result	Record	Site (attendance) city, state
Exhibition
Nov 4, 2018*; 2:00 pm		UW–Oshkosh	W 79–51		Kohl Center (3,524); Madison, WI
Non-conference regular season
Nov 8, 2018*; 7:00 pm		Winthrop	W 76–41	1–0	Kohl Center (3,102); Madison, WI
Nov 13, 2018*; 7:00 pm		at Milwaukee	W 68–57	2–0	Klotsche Center (1,049); Milwaukee, WI
Nov 17, 2018*; 12:00 pm		North Dakota State	W 64–53	3–0	Kohl Center (3,275); Madison, WI
Nov 19, 2018*; 7:00 pm		IUPUI	W 65–64 ^{OT}	4–0	Kohl Center (2,902); Madison, WI
Nov 23, 2018*; 5:00 pm		vs. Pittsburgh; Challenge in Music City	W 57–42	5–0	Nashville Municipal Auditorium (750); Nashville, TN
Nov 24, 2018*; 5:00 pm		vs. Tennessee State; Challenge in Music City	W 58–53	6–0	Nashville Municipal Auditorium; Nashville, TN
Nov 25, 2018*; 7:30 pm		vs. Arkansas; Challenge in Music City	L 68–69	6–1	Nashville Municipal Auditorium; Nashville, TN
Nov 28, 2018*; 8:00 pm, BTN		Duke; ACC–Big Ten Women's Challenge	L 53–60	6–2	Kohl Center (3,483); Madison, WI
Dec 4, 2018*; 7:00 pm		Marshall	W 67–49	7–2	Kohl Center (2,837); Madison, WI
Dec 8, 2018*; 1:00 pm		at Green Bay	L 46–55	7–3	Kress Events Center (3,530); Green Bay, WI
Dec 12, 2018*; 7:00 pm		Chicago State	W 85–38	8–3	Kohl Center (2,943); Madison, WI
Dec 21, 2018*; 7:00 pm		Evansville	W 96–60	9–3	Kohl Center (3,980); Madison, WI
Big Ten regular season
Dec 28, 2018; 8:00 pm, BTN		at No. 12 Minnesota	L 56–74	9–4 (0–1)	Williams Arena (7,918); Minneapolis, MN
Dec 31, 2018; 2:00 pm		Purdue	W 76–69	10–4 (1–1)	Kohl Center (3,982); Madison, WI
Jan 3, 2019; 6:00 pm		at Penn State	L 64–71	10–5 (1–2)	Bryce Jordan Center (2,093); University Park, PA
Jan 7, 2019; 7:00 pm		at No. 17 Iowa	L 53–71	10–6 (1–3)	Carver–Hawkeye Arena (3,428); Iowa City, IA
Jan 13, 2019; 2:00 pm		No. 25 Indiana	L 68–75	10–7 (1–4)	Kohl Center (6,092); Madison, WI
Jan 17, 2019; 7:00 pm		No. 23 Minnesota	L 50–78	10–8 (1–5)	Kohl Center (3,137); Madison, WI
Jan 20, 2019; 3:30 pm		at Northwestern	L 46–72	10–9 (1–6)	Welsh–Ryan Arena (1,524); Evanston, IL
Jan 24, 2019; 7:00 pm		Penn State	L 59–65	10–10 (1–7)	Kohl Center (3,074); Madison, WI
Jan 27, 2019; 2:00 pm		Nebraska	W 70–69	11–10 (2–7)	Kohl Center (6,074); Madison, WI
Jan 31, 2019; 6:00 pm		at No. 11 Maryland	L 57–75	11–11 (2–8)	Xfinity Center (4,594); College Park, MD
Feb 3, 2019; 2:00 pm		Michigan	L 70–76	11–12 (2–9)	Kohl Center (6,670); Madison, WI
Feb 10, 2019; 2:00 pm		at Illinois	L 68–78	11–13 (2–10)	State Farm Center (1,844); Champaign, IL
Feb 14, 2019; 7:00 pm		No. 24 Michigan State	W 79–62	12–13 (3–10)	Kohl Center (3,356); Madison, WI
Feb 17, 2019; 1:00 pm		at Ohio State	L 68–70	12–14 (3–11)	Value City Arena (5,931); Columbus, OH
Feb 20, 2019; 7:00 pm		Illinois	W 75–67	13–14 (4–11)	Kohl Center (3,866); Madison, WI
Feb 25, 2019; 6:00 pm		at Rutgers	L 53–73	13–15 (4–12)	Louis Brown Athletic Center (2,154); Piscataway, NJ
Feb 28, 2019; 8:00 pm, BTN		Ohio State	L 50–61	13–16 (4–13)	Kohl Center (3,529); Madison, WI
Mar 3, 2019; 1:00 pm		at Michigan	L 49–59	13–17 (4–14)	Crisler Center (3,786); Ann Arbor, MI
Big Ten Conference Women's Tournament
Mar 6, 2019; 12:30 pm, BTN	(13)	vs. (12) Penn State; First Round	W 65–57	14–17	Bankers Life Fieldhouse; Indianapolis, IN
Mar 7, 2019; 1:30 pm, BTN	(13)	vs. (5) Ohio State; Second Round	W 73–63	15–17	Bankers Life Fieldhouse (3,173); Indianapolis, IN
Mar 8, 2019; 1:30 pm, BTN	(13)	vs. (4) Michigan; Quarterfinals	L 65–73 ^{2OT}	15–18	Bankers Life Fieldhouse (4,014); Indianapolis, IN
*Non-conference game. ^{#}Rankings from AP Poll. (#) Tournament seedings in parentheses. All times are in Central Time.

== See also ==
2018–19 Wisconsin Badgers men's basketball team
