= 2018–19 Michigan State Spartans women's basketball team =

Intercollegiate basketball season

2018–19 Michigan State Spartans women's basketball

NCAA tournament, second round
- Conference: Big Ten Conference
- Record: 21–12 (9–9 Big Ten)
- Head coach: Suzy Merchant (12th season)
- Assistant coaches: Amaka Agugua-Hamilton; Maria Fantanarosa; Alysiah Bond
- Home arena: Breslin Center

2018–19 Big Ten women's basketball standings
	Conf.				Overall
Team	W		L	PCT	W		L	PCT
No. 9 Maryland	15	–	3	.833	29	–	5	.853
No. 8 Iowa †	14	–	4	.778	29	–	7	.806
Rutgers	13	–	5	.722	22	–	10	.688
Michigan	11	–	7	.611	22	–	12	.647
Ohio State	10	–	8	.556	14	–	15	.483
Minnesota	9	–	9	.500	21	–	11	.656
Michigan State	9	–	9	.500	21	–	12	.636
Northwestern	9	–	9	.500	21	–	15	.583
Nebraska	9	–	9	.500	14	–	16	.467
Indiana	8	–	10	.444	21	–	13	.618
Purdue	8	–	10	.444	19	–	15	.559
Penn State	5	–	13	.278	12	–	18	.400
Wisconsin	4	–	14	.222	15	–	18	.455
Illinois	2	–	16	.111	10	–	20	.333
† 2019 Big Ten tournament winner Rankings from AP poll

The 2018–19 Michigan State Spartans women's basketball team represented Michigan State University during the 2018–19 NCAA Division I women's basketball season. The Spartans, led by 12th-year head coach Suzy Merchant, played their home games at the Breslin Center in East Lansing, Michigan as members of the Big Ten Conference. They finished with a record of 25–12, 9–9 in Big Ten play to finish in a 4 way tie for sixth place. They advanced to the quarterfinals of the Big Ten women's tournament where they lost to Maryland. They received an at-large bid to the NCAA women's tournament where they defeated Central Michigan in the first round before losing to Notre Dame in the second round.

== Roster ==
2018–19 Michigan State Spartans women's basketball team
Players
Coaches

Pos.	#	Name	Height	Year	Previous school	Hometown
G	0	Shay Colley	5 ft 8 in (1.73 m)	RS Jr	St. Edmund Campion Secondary; South Carolina	Brampton, ON
G/F	1	Tory Ozment	6 ft 1 in (1.85 m)	Fr	Buford	Buford, GA
F	2	Mardrekia Cook	6 ft 0 in (1.83 m)	Jr	Muskegon	Muskegon, MI
G	4	Taryn McCutcheon	5 ft 5 in (1.65 m)	Jr	East Lansing	East Lansing, MI
G	5	Claire Hendrickson	5 ft 11 in (1.8 m)	RS Fr	Wyoming	Wyoming, MI
F	10	Sidney Cooks	6 ft 4 in (1.93 m)	So	St. Joseph	Kenosha, WI
F	11	Nathy Dambo	6 ft 3 in (1.91 m)	RS Jr	Junípero Serra	Fort-de-France, Martinique
F	12	Nia Hollie	6 ft 0 in (1.83 m)	Jr	Hopkins	Minnetonka, MN
F	15	Victoria Gaines	6 ft 1 in (1.85 m)	RS Jr	Merrillville	Merrillville, IN
G	24	Nia Clouden	5 ft 8 in (1.73 m)	Fr	St. Frances	Owings Mills, MD
C	33	Jenna Allen	6 ft 3 in (1.91 m)	Sr	North Lawrence	Bedford, IN
F	42	Kayla Belles	6 ft 3 in (1.91 m)	Fr	Ithaca	Ithaca, MI

Head coach

- Suzy Merchant (Central Michigan)

Assistant coach(es)

- Amaka Agugua-Hamilton (Hofstra)
- Maria Fantanarosa (Miami (OH))
- Alysiah Bond (Ohio State)

Legend

- (C) Team captain
- (S) Suspended
- (I) Ineligible
- (W) Walk-on
- Injured
- Current redshirt

Roster

== Schedule and results ==
Date time, TV	Rank^{#}	Opponent^{#}	Result	Record	Site (attendance) city, state
Exhibition
11/01/2018*; 7:00 pm		Hillsdale	W 88–59		Breslin Center (2,547); East Lansing, MI
Non-conference regular season
11/06/2018*; 7:00 pm		Bowling Green	W 99–69	1–0	Breslin Center (4,278); East Lansing, MI
11/11/2018*; 1:00 pm		East Tennessee State	W 75–53	2–0	Breslin Center (4,379); East Lansing, MI
11/18/2018*; 1:00 pm		Wright State	W 84–68	3–0	Breslin Center (5,233); East Lansing, MI
11/22/2018*; 6:30 pm		vs. No. 15 NC State; Cancún Challenge Riviera Division	L 74–78	3–1	Hard Rock Hotel Riviera Maya; Cancún, Mexico
11/23/2018*; 9:00 pm		vs. Kennesaw State; Cancún Challenge Riviera Division	W 75–51	4–1	Hard Rock Hotel Riviera Maya (300); Cancún, Mexico
11/28/2018*; 7:00 pm, BTN		Virginia; ACC–Big Ten Women's Challenge	W 91–66	5–1	Breslin Center (4,219); East Lansing, MI
12/02/2018*; 2:00 pm		Texas Southern	W 91–45	6–1	Breslin Center (4,470); East Lansing, MI
12/05/2018*; 7:00 pm		at Oakland	W 102–58	7–1	Athletics Center O'rena (1,288); Rochester, MI
12/09/2018*; 3:00 pm, ESPN2		No. 3 Oregon	W 88–82	8–1	Breslin Center (6,462); East Lansing, MI
12/16/2018*; 2:00 pm	No. 23	at Hartford	W 74–66 ^{OT}	9–1	Chase Arena at Reich Family Pavilion (1,179); West Hartford, CT
12/20/2018*; 7:00 pm	No. 22	Florida Atlantic	W 89–74	10–1	Breslin Center (4,393); East Lansing, MI
Big Ten regular season
12/30/2018; 1:00 pm, ESPN2	No. 21	No. 16 Iowa	W 84–70	11–1 (1–0)	Breslin Center (9,520); East Lansing, MI
01/03/2019; 8:00 pm	No. 15	at Northwestern	L 62–70	11–2 (1–1)	Welsh–Ryan Arena (1,071); Evanston, IL
01/06/2019; 2:00 pm	No. 15	at Indiana	L 64–68	11–3 (1–2)	Simon Skjodt Assembly Hall (6,380); Bloomington, IN
01/09/2019; 7:00 pm	No. 23	No. 18 Minnesota	W 86–68	12–3 (2–2)	Breslin Center (5,018); East Lansing, MI
01/14/2019; 7:00 pm, BTN	No. 17	at Ohio State	L 55–65	12–4 (2–3)	Value City Arena (4,695); Columbus, OH
01/17/2019; 6:00 pm, BTN	No. 17	No. 9 Maryland	W 77–60	13–4 (3–3)	Breslin Center (5,651); East Lansing, MI
01/20/2019; 2:00 pm	No. 17	at No. 20 Rutgers	L 62–76	13–5 (3–4)	Louis Brown Athletic Center (2,539); Piscataway, NJ
01/24/2019; 7:00 pm, BTN	No. 23	Illinois	W 77–60	14–5 (4–4)	Breslin Center (4,745); East Lansing, MI
01/27/2019; 2:00 pm, BTN	No. 23	at Michigan; Rivalry	W 77–73	15–5 (5–4)	Crisler Center (12,707); Ann Arbor, MI
02/03/2019; 2:00 pm, BTN	No. 22	Purdue	W 74–66	16–5 (6–4)	Breslin Center (7,450); East Lansing, MI
02/07/2019; 9:00 pm, BTN	No. 23	at No. 16 Iowa	L 71–86	16–6 (6–5)	Carver–Hawkeye Arena (6,287); Iowa City, IA
02/11/2019; 7:00 pm, BTN	No. 24	Indiana	W 77–61	17–6 (7–5)	Breslin Center (3,542); East Lansing, MI
02/14/2019; 8:00 pm	No. 24	at Wisconsin	L 62–79	17–7 (7–6)	Kohl Center (3,356); Madison, WI
02/17/2019; 4:00 pm, BTN	No. 24	at Nebraska	L 71–82	17–8 (7–7)	Pinnacle Bank Arena (5,588); Lincoln, NE
02/21/2019; 6:00 pm, BTN		Ohio State	L 70–77	17–9 (7–8)	Breslin Center (4,857); East Lansing, MI
02/24/2019; 2:00 pm, ESPN2		Michigan; Rivalry	W 74–64	18–9 (8–8)	Breslin Center (11,368); East Lansing, MI
02/27/2019; 7:00 pm		Penn State; Rescheduled from January 31	W 57–48	19–9 (9–8)	Breslin Center (2,356); East Lansing, MI
03/04/2019; 4:00 pm		at Minnesota	L 63–81	19–10 (9–9)	Williams Arena (7,707); Minneapolis, MN
Big Ten tournament
03/07/2019; 12:00 pm, BTN	(9)	vs. (8) Northwestern; Second Round	W 68–52	20–10	Bankers Life Fieldhouse; Indianapolis, IN
03/08/2019; 12:00 pm, BTN	(9)	vs. (1) No. 8 Maryland; Quarterfinals	L 55–71	20–11	Bankers Life Fieldhouse; Indianapolis, IN
NCAA Women's Tournament
03/23/2019*; 1:30 pm, ESPN2	(7 C)	vs. (10 C) Central Michigan; First Round	W 88–87	21–11	Edmund P. Joyce Center (7,885); South Bend, IN
03/25/2019*; 7:00 pm, ESPN	(7 C)	at (1 C) No. 3 Notre Dame; Second Round	L 63–91	21–12	Edmund P. Joyce Center (6,694); South Bend, IN
*Non-conference game. ^{#}Rankings from AP Poll. (#) Tournament seedings in parentheses. C=Chicago Region. All times are in Eastern Time; Source.

== Rankings ==
2018–19 NCAA Division I women's basketball rankings

Regular season polls
Poll	Pre- Season	Week 2	Week 3	Week 4	Week 5	Week 6	Week 7	Week 8	Week 9	Week 10	Week 11	Week 12	Week 13	Week 14	Week 15	Week 16	Week 17	Week 18	Week 19	Final
AP						23	22	21	15	23	17	23	22	23	24	RV				N/A
Coaches			RV	RV	RV	23-T	22	22	17	24	22	21	22	21	22	RV	RV			RV

Legend
	Increase in ranking
	Decrease in ranking
	No change
(RV)	Received votes
(NR)	Not ranked

== See also ==
2018–19 Michigan State Spartans men's basketball team
