= 2018–19 Penn State Lady Lions basketball team =

Intercollegiate basketball season

2018–19 Penn State Lady Lions basketball
- Conference: Big Ten Conference
- Record: 12–18 (5–13 Big Ten)
- Head coach: Coquese Washington (12th season)
- Assistant coaches: Itoro Coleman; Tamika Williams-Jeter; Geoff Lanier
- Home arena: Bryce Jordan Center

2018–19 Big Ten women's basketball standings
	Conf.				Overall
Team	W		L	PCT	W		L	PCT
No. 9 Maryland	15	–	3	.833	29	–	5	.853
No. 8 Iowa †	14	–	4	.778	29	–	7	.806
Rutgers	13	–	5	.722	22	–	10	.688
Michigan	11	–	7	.611	22	–	12	.647
Ohio State	10	–	8	.556	14	–	15	.483
Minnesota	9	–	9	.500	21	–	11	.656
Michigan State	9	–	9	.500	21	–	12	.636
Northwestern	9	–	9	.500	21	–	15	.583
Nebraska	9	–	9	.500	14	–	16	.467
Indiana	8	–	10	.444	21	–	13	.618
Purdue	8	–	10	.444	19	–	15	.559
Penn State	5	–	13	.278	12	–	18	.400
Wisconsin	4	–	14	.222	15	–	18	.455
Illinois	2	–	16	.111	10	–	20	.333
† 2019 Big Ten tournament winner Rankings from AP poll

The 2018–19 Penn State Lady Lions basketball team represented Pennsylvania State University during the 2018–19 NCAA Division I women's basketball season. The Lady Lions, led by 12th-year head coach Coquese Washington, played their home games at the Bryce Jordan Center as members of the Big Ten Conference. They finished the season of 12–18, 5–13 in Big Ten play to finish in twelfth place. They lost in the first round of the Big Ten women's tournament to Wisconsin.

On March 9, Coquese Washington was fired as head coach. She finished at Penn State with a 12-year record of 209–169.

== Roster ==
2018–19 Penn State Nittany Lions women's basketball team
Players
Coaches

Pos.	#	Name	Height	Year	Previous school	Hometown
F	1	Alisia Smith	6 ft 3 in (1.91 m)	So	Waverly	Lansing, MI
G	2	Amari Carter	5 ft 8 in (1.73 m)	RS Jr	St. John's College	Washington, D.C.
G	3	Karisma Ortiz	6 ft 0 in (1.83 m)	Fr	Archbishop Mitty	San Jose, CA
G	4	Siyeh Frazier	5 ft 9 in (1.75 m)	Jr	Renaissance	Detroit, MI
G	5	Kemaria McDaniel	5 ft 10 in (1.78 m)	So	Dearborn Heights Robichaud	Inkster, MI
G	11	Teniya Page	5 ft 7 in (1.7 m)	Sr	Marian Catholic	Chicago, IL
G	22	Leah Knizner	5 ft 9 in (1.75 m)	Sr	Hempfield Area	Greensburg, PA
F	24	Sam Breen	6 ft 1 in (1.85 m)	So	Cardinal Wuerl North Catholic	Gibsonia, PA
G	31	Jaida Travascio-Green	6 ft 2 in (1.88 m)	Jr	Downers Grove North	Lisle, IL
F	33	Lauren Ebo	6 ft 4 in (1.93 m)	Fr	Riverdale Baptist	Washington, D.C.
G	34	Sarah McMurtry	5 ft 6 in (1.68 m)	Sr	Upper St. Clair	Pittsburgh, PA
F	43	Bexley Wallace	6 ft 3 in (1.91 m)	Fr	Pickerington Central	Pickerington, OH

Head coach

- Coquese Washington (Notre Dame)

Assistant coach(es)

- Itoro Coleman (Clemson)
- Tamika Williams-Jeter (Connecticut)
- Jocelyn Wyatt (Appalachian State)

Legend

- (C) Team captain
- (S) Suspended
- (I) Ineligible
- (W) Walk-on
- Injured
- Current redshirt

Roster

== Schedule and results ==
Date time, TV	Rank^{#}	Opponent^{#}	Result	Record	Site (attendance) city, state
Exhibition
Oct 28, 2018*; 2:00 pm		Lock Haven	W 92–57		Bryce Jordan Center (857); University Park, PA
Non-conference regular season
Nov 8, 2018*; 7:00 pm		Providence	W 74–72	1–0	Bryce Jordan Center (2,115); University Park, PA
Nov 11, 2018*; 2:00 pm		No. 24 California	L 58–75	1–1	Bryce Jordan Center (2,406); University Park, PA
Nov 14, 2018*; 7:00 pm		at Fordham	W 72–55	2–1	Rose Hill Gymnasium (639); Bronx, NY
Nov 18, 2018*; 2:00 pm, BTN		Princeton	W 79–71 ^{OT}	3–1	Bryce Jordan Center (2,026); University Park, PA
Nov 21, 2018*; 2:00 pm		North Dakota	W 75–68	4–1	Bryce Jordan Center (1,881); University Park, PA
Nov 25, 2018*; 1:00 pm, BTN		Stony Brook	L 70–81	4–2	Bryce Jordan Center (2,018); University Park, PA
Nov 29, 2018*; 7:00 pm		at Florida State; ACC–Big Ten Women's Challenge	L 58–87	4–3	Donald L. Tucker Center (2,501); Tallahassee, FL
Dec 2, 2018*; 2:00 pm		Jacksonville	W 80–61	5–3	Bryce Jordan Center (2,121); University Park, PA
Dec 5, 2018*; 7:00 pm		Duquesne	L 58–64	5–4	Bryce Jordan Center (1,989); University Park, PA
Dec 9, 2018*; 2:00 pm		St. Bonaventure	W 80–65	6–4	Bryce Jordan Center (2,152); University Park, PA
Dec 16, 2018*; 2:00 pm		American	W 80–59	7–4	Bryce Jordan Center (2,257); University Park, PA
Big Ten conference season
Dec 28, 2018; 1:00 pm		No. 4 Maryland	L 61–77	7–5 (0–1)	Bryce Jordan Center (2,259); University Park, PA
Dec 31, 2018; 7:00 pm		at Indiana	L 75–83	7–6 (0–2)	Simon Skjodt Assembly Hall (4,481); Bloomington, IN
Jan 3, 2019; 7:00 pm		Wisconsin	W 71–64	8–6 (1–2)	Bryce Jordan Center (2,093); University Park, PA
Jan 6, 2019; 4:00 pm		at Rutgers	L 61–74	8–7 (1–3)	Louis Brown Athletic Center (1,868); Piscataway, NJ
Jan 12, 2019; 2:00 pm		Illinois	W 62–48	9–7 (2–3)	Bryce Jordan Center (2,472); University Park, PA
Jan 17, 2019; 7:00 pm		Ohio State	L 71–76 ^{OT}	9–8 (2–4)	Bryce Jordan Center (2,090); University Park, PA
Jan 20, 2019; 1:00 pm, ESPN2		at No. 9 Maryland	L 67–79	9–9 (2–5)	Xfinity Center (7,684); College Park, MD
Jan 24, 2019; 8:00 pm		at Wisconsin	W 65–59	10–9 (3–5)	Kohl Center (3,074); Madison, WI
Jan 27, 2019; 7:00 pm		No. 14 Rutgers	L 61–69	10–10 (3–6)	Bryce Jordan Center (2,463); University Park, PA
Feb 3, 2019; 2:00 pm		No. 13 Iowa	L 61–81	10–11 (3–7)	Bryce Jordan Center (2,815); University Park, PA
Feb 6, 2019; 7:00 pm		at Ohio State	L 73–78	10–12 (3–8)	Value City Arena (4,264); Columbus, OH
Feb 10, 2019; 2:00 pm		Michigan	L 62–66	10–13 (3–9)	Bryce Jordan Center (5,024); University Park, PA
Feb 14, 2019; 8:00 pm		at Northwestern	L 63–78	10–14 (3–10)	Welsh–Ryan Arena (490); Evanston, IL
Feb 17, 2019; 2:00 pm, BTN		at Minnesota	L 67–97	10–15 (3–11)	Williams Arena (5,869); Minneapolis, MN
Feb 21, 2019; 7:00 pm		Purdue	W 72–61	11–15 (4–11)	Bryce Jordan Center (2,049); University Park, PA
Feb 24, 2019; 2:00 pm, BTN		at Illinois	W 76–65	12–15 (5–11)	State Farm Center (1,532); Champaign, IL
Feb 27, 2019; 7:00 pm		at Michigan State; Rescheduled from January 31	L 48–57	12–16 (5–12)	Breslin Center (2,356); East Lansing, MI
Mar 2, 2019; 3:00 pm, BTN		Nebraska	L 74–79	12–17 (5–13)	Bryce Jordan Center (2,545); University Park, PA
Big Ten Women's Tournament
Mar 6, 2019; 1:30 pm, BTN	(12)	vs. (13) Wisconsin; First Round	L 57–65	12–18	Bankers Life Fieldhouse; Indianapolis, IN
*Non-conference game. ^{#}Rankings from AP Poll. (#) Tournament seedings in parentheses. All times are in Eastern Time.

== Rankings ==
Regular season polls
Poll	Pre- Season	Week 2	Week 3	Week 4	Week 5	Week 6	Week 7	Week 8	Week 9	Week 10	Week 11	Week 12	Week 13	Week 14	Week 15	Week 16	Week 17	Week 18	Week 19	Final
AP																				N/A
Coaches																				

Legend
	Increase in ranking
	Decrease in ranking
	Not ranked previous week
(RV)	Received Votes

== See also ==
- 2018–19 Penn State Nittany Lions basketball team
