= 2018–19 Rutgers Scarlet Knights women's basketball team =

Intercollegiate basketball season

2018–19 Rutgers Scarlet Knights women's basketball

NCAA tournament, first round
- Conference: Big Ten Conference
- Record: 22–10 (13–5 Big Ten)
- Head coach: C. Vivian Stringer (24th season)
- Assistant coaches: Timothy Eatman; Kelley Gibson; Nadine Domond
- Home arena: Louis Brown Athletic Center

2018–19 Big Ten women's basketball standings
	Conf.				Overall
Team	W		L	PCT	W		L	PCT
No. 9 Maryland	15	–	3	.833	29	–	5	.853
No. 8 Iowa †	14	–	4	.778	29	–	7	.806
Rutgers	13	–	5	.722	22	–	10	.688
Michigan	11	–	7	.611	22	–	12	.647
Ohio State	10	–	8	.556	14	–	15	.483
Minnesota	9	–	9	.500	21	–	11	.656
Michigan State	9	–	9	.500	21	–	12	.636
Northwestern	9	–	9	.500	21	–	15	.583
Nebraska	9	–	9	.500	14	–	16	.467
Indiana	8	–	10	.444	21	–	13	.618
Purdue	8	–	10	.444	19	–	15	.559
Penn State	5	–	13	.278	12	–	18	.400
Wisconsin	4	–	14	.222	15	–	18	.455
Illinois	2	–	16	.111	10	–	20	.333
† 2019 Big Ten tournament winner Rankings from AP poll

The 2018–19 Rutgers Scarlet Knights women's basketball team represented Rutgers University during the 2018–19 NCAA Division I women's basketball season. The Scarlet Knights, led by 24th year head coach C. Vivian Stringer, played their home games at the Louis Brown Athletic Center, better known as The RAC, as a member of the Big Ten Conference. They finished the season 22–10, 13–5 in Big Ten play to finish in third place. They advanced to the semifinals of the Big Ten women's tournament, where they lost to Iowa. They received an at-large bid to the NCAA women's tournament in the 7th seed in the Albany Regional, where they got upset by Buffalo in the first round.

== Roster ==
2018–19 Rutgers Scarlet Knights women's basketball team
Players
Coaches

Pos.	#	Name	Height	Year	Previous school	Hometown
G	1	Zipporah Broughton	5 ft 7 in (1.7 m)	Fr	Robert E. Lee	Wetumpka, AL
G	2	Noga Peleg Pelc	5 ft 7 in (1.7 m)	Fr		Even Yehuda, Israel
G	3	Charise Wilson	5 ft 5 in (1.65 m)	RS Sr	St. Anthony's; Rhode Island	West Babylon, NY
G	4	Sierra Calhoun	6 ft 0 in (1.83 m)	RS Sr	Christ the King; Ohio State	Brooklyn, NY
G	5	Ciani Cryor	5 ft 5 in (1.65 m)	RS Jr	Neumann-Goretti; Georgia Tech	Philadelphia, PA
G	12	Khadaizha Sanders	5 ft 7 in (1.7 m)	Sr	Bishop McNamara	Virginia Beach, IL
F	13	Mael Gilles	6 ft 1 in (1.85 m)	So	Montmorency	Montréal-Nord, Quebec
F	15	Caitlin Jenkins	6 ft 3 in (1.91 m)	Sr	Huntington; Southern Miss/Southern	Shreveport, LA
F	22	Tyia Singleton	6 ft 2 in (1.88 m)	Fr	Winter Haven	Winter Haven, FL
G	24	Arella Guirantes	5 ft 11 in (1.8 m)	RS So	Bellport; Texas Tech	Bellport, NY
G/F	31	Tekia Mack	6 ft 1 in (1.85 m)	So	Marshall	Chicago, IL
F	35	Stasha Carey	6 ft 2 in (1.88 m)	RS Sr	Berea-Midpark; Pittsburgh	Cleveland, OH
F/C	40	Victoria Harris	6 ft 3 in (1.91 m)	Sr	Parkview	Snellville, GA
C	44	Jordan Wallace	6 ft 3 in (1.91 m)	Jr	Sterling	Somerdale, NJ

Head coach

- C. Vivian Stringer (Slippery Rock)

Assistant coach(es)

- Tim Eatman (Talladega)
- Kelley Gibson (Maryland)
- Nadine Domond (Iowa)

Legend

- (C) Team captain
- (S) Suspended
- (I) Ineligible
- (W) Walk-on
- Injured
- Current redshirt

Roster

== Schedule ==
Date time, TV	Rank^{#}	Opponent^{#}	Result	Record	Site (attendance) city, state
Regular season
Nov 6, 2018*; 7:00 pm		St. Francis (PA)	W 96–52	1–0	Louis Brown Athletic Center (1,415); Piscataway, NJ
Nov 9, 2018*; 2:00 pm		Stony Brook	W 61–47	2–0	Louis Brown Athletic Center (1,187); Piscataway, NJ
Nov 13, 2018*; 7:00 pm, BTN		Central Connecticut State	W 73–44	3–0	Louis Brown Athletic Center (4,583); Piscataway, NJ
Nov 16, 2018*; 5:00 pm		at Charlotte	Postponed		Dale F. Halton Arena; Charlotte, NC
Nov 18, 2018*; 4:00 pm		Albany	W 65–39	4–0	Louis Brown Athletic Center (1,625); Piscataway, NJ
Nov 22, 2018*; 5:30 pm		vs. Drake; Vancouver Showcase Quarterfinals	L 59–69	4–1	Vancouver Convention Centre (383); Vancouver, BC
Nov 23, 2018*; 3:00 pm		vs. Gonzaga; Vancouver Showcase Consolation 2nd round	L 40–57	4–2	Vancouver Convention Centre (1,022); Vancouver, BC
Nov 24, 2018*; 2:00 pm		vs. East Tennessee State; Vancouver Showcase 7th place game	W 68–44	5–2	Vancouver Convention Centre (722); Vancouver, BC
Nov 28, 2018*; 7:00 pm		at Virginia Tech; ACC–Big Ten Women's Challenge	L 51–67	5–3	Cassell Coliseum (966); Blacksburg, VA
Dec 8, 2018*; 2:00 pm, ESPN+		at Harvard	W 60–49	6–3	Lavietes Pavilion (783); Cambridge, MA
Dec 15, 2018*; 4:00 pm, BTN		LSU	W 57–43	7–3	Louis Brown Athletic Center (1,726); Piscataway, NJ
Dec 28, 2018; 4:00 pm		Northwestern	W 45–41	8–3 (1–0)	Louis Brown Athletic Center (1,952); Piscataway, NJ
Dec 31, 2018; 12:00 pm		at No. 4 Maryland	W 73–65	9–3 (2–0)	Xfinity Center (5,892); College Park, MD
Jan 4, 2019*; 4:00 pm		Brown	W 73–52	10–3	Louis Brown Athletic Center (1,449); Piscataway, NJ
Jan 6, 2019; 4:00 pm		Penn State	W 74–61	11–3 (3–0)	Louis Brown Athletic Center (1,868); Piscataway, NJ
Jan 9, 2019; 8:00 pm		at Illinois	W 71–60	12–3 (4–0)	State Farm Center (1,150); Champaign, IL
Jan 13, 2019; 3:00 pm, BTN		at Nebraska	W 62–56	13–3 (5–0)	Pinnacle Bank Arena (4,222); Lincoln, NE
Jan 16, 2019; 7:00 pm	No. 20	Purdue	W 65–63 ^{OT}	14–3 (6–0)	Louis Brown Athletic Center (1,419); Piscataway, NJ
Jan 20, 2019; 2:00 pm	No. 20	No. 17 Michigan State	W 76–62	15–3 (7–0)	Louis Brown Athletic Center (2,539); Piscataway, NJ
Jan 23, 2019; 8:00 pm	No. 14	at No. 17 Iowa	L 66–72	15–4 (7–1)	Carver–Hawkeye Arena (6,035); Iowa City, IA
Jan 27, 2019; 2:00 pm	No. 14	at Penn State	W 69–61	16–4 (8–1)	Bryce Jordan Center (2,463); University Park, PA
Jan 31, 2019; 7:00 pm	No. 17	Indiana	W 69–64	17–4 (9–1)	Louis Brown Athletic Center (1,776); Piscataway, NJ
Feb 3, 2019; 4:00 pm	No. 17	at Minnesota	L 46–60	17–5 (9–2)	Williams Arena (4,888); Minneapolis, MN
Feb 10, 2019; 2:00 pm	No. 20	No. 10 Maryland	L 48–62	17–6 (9–3)	Louis Brown Athletic Center (4,573); Piscataway, NJ
Feb 14, 2019; 4:00 pm	No. 23	Ohio State	L 39–59	17–7 (9–4)	Louis Brown Athletic Center (1,849); Piscataway, NJ
Feb 18, 2019; 7:00 pm, BTN		at Indiana	W 69–61	18–7 (10–4)	Simon Skjodt Assembly Hall (3,324); Bloomington, IN
Feb 21, 2019; 7:00 pm		at Michigan	L 76–86	18–8 (10–5)	Crisler Center (2,508); Ann Arbor, MI
Feb 25, 2019; 7:00 pm		Wisconsin	W 73–53	19–8 (11–5)	Louis Brown Athletic Center (2,154); Piscataway, NJ
Feb 28, 2019; 6:30 pm, BTN		Minnesota	W 60–54	20–8 (12–5)	Louis Brown Athletic Center (2,852); Piscataway, NJ
Mar 3, 2019; 2:00 pm, BTN		at Ohio State	W 66–56	21–8 (13–5)	Value City Arena (5,030); Columbus, OH
Big Ten Women's Tournament
Mar 8, 2019; 9:00 pm, BTN	(3)	vs. (11) Purdue; Quarterfinals	W 64–49	22–8	Bankers Life Fieldhouse (4,325); Indianapolis, IN
Mar 9, 2019; 7:30 pm, BTN	(3)	vs. (2) No. 10 Iowa; Semifinals	L 67–72	22–9	Bankers Life Fieldhouse (4,415); Indianapolis, IN
NCAA Women's Tournament
Mar 22, 2019*; 4:30 pm, ESPN2	(7 A)	vs. (10 A) Buffalo; First Round	L 71–82	22–10	Harry A. Gampel Pavilion; Storrs, CT
*Non-conference game. ^{#}Rankings from AP Poll. (#) Tournament seedings in parentheses. A=Albany Region. All times are in Eastern Time.

== Rankings ==
Ranking movement Legend: ██ Increase in ranking. ██ Decrease in ranking. NR = Not ranked. RV = Received votes.
Poll	Pre	Wk 2	Wk 3	Wk 4	Wk 5	Wk 6	Wk 7	Wk 8	Wk 9	Wk 10	Wk 11	Wk 12	Wk 13	Wk 14	Wk 15	Wk 16	Wk 17	Wk 18	Wk 19	Final
AP										RV	20-T	14	17	20-T	23	RV	RV	RV	RV	N/A
Coaches										RV	23	18	19	24	24	RV	RV	RV	RV	RV

== See also ==
- 2018–19 Rutgers Scarlet Knights men's basketball team
