= 2018–19 Purdue Boilermakers women's basketball team =

Intercollegiate basketball season

2018–19 Purdue Boilermakers women's basketball
- Conference: Big Ten Conference
- Record: 19–15 (8–10 Big Ten)
- Head coach: Sharon Versyp (13th season)
- Assistant coaches: Nadine Morgan; Beth Couture; Lindsay Wisdom-Hylton
- Home arena: Mackey Arena

2018–19 Big Ten women's basketball standings
	Conf.				Overall
Team	W		L	PCT	W		L	PCT
No. 9 Maryland	15	–	3	.833	29	–	5	.853
No. 8 Iowa †	14	–	4	.778	29	–	7	.806
Rutgers	13	–	5	.722	22	–	10	.688
Michigan	11	–	7	.611	22	–	12	.647
Ohio State	10	–	8	.556	14	–	15	.483
Minnesota	9	–	9	.500	21	–	11	.656
Michigan State	9	–	9	.500	21	–	12	.636
Northwestern	9	–	9	.500	21	–	15	.583
Nebraska	9	–	9	.500	14	–	16	.467
Indiana	8	–	10	.444	21	–	13	.618
Purdue	8	–	10	.444	19	–	15	.559
Penn State	5	–	13	.278	12	–	18	.400
Wisconsin	4	–	14	.222	15	–	18	.455
Illinois	2	–	16	.111	10	–	20	.333
† 2019 Big Ten tournament winner Rankings from AP poll

The 2018–19 Purdue Boilermakers women's basketball team represented Purdue University during the 2018–19 NCAA Division I women's basketball season. Boilermakers, led by 13th-year head coach Sharon Versyp, played their home games at Mackey Arena and were members of the Big Ten Conference. They finished the season 19–15, 8–10 in Big Ten play to finish in tie for tenth place. They advanced to the quarterfinals of the Big Ten women's tournament, where they lost to Rutgers.

== Roster ==
2018–19 Purdue Boilermakers women's basketball team
Players
Coaches

Pos.	#	Name	Height	Year	Previous school	Hometown
G	1	Karissa McLaughlin	5 ft 7 in (1.7 m)	So	Homestead	Fort Wayne, IN
G	2	Abby Abel	5 ft 5 in (1.65 m)	Sr	Carmel	Carmel, IN
G	3	Lyndsey Whilby (redshirt)	5 ft 11 in (1.8 m)	So	McEachern; Texas Tech	Powder Springs, GA
G	5	Cassidy Hardin	5 ft 10 in (1.78 m)	Fr	Center Grove	Bargersville, IN
G	11	Dominique Oden	5 ft 8 in (1.73 m)	Jr	Marist	Atlanta, GA
C	12	Nora Kiesler	6 ft 6 in (1.98 m)	So	Assumption	Louisville, KY
G	13	Ajah Stallings	5 ft 9 in (1.75 m)	Fr	North Central	Indianapolis, IN
G	15	Léony Boudreau	5 ft 10 in (1.78 m)	So	Dawson College	Montreal, Quebec
F	22	Jenelle Grant (redshirt)	6 ft 0 in (1.83 m)	Jr	Harris Westminster; Pacific	London, England
G	23	Kayana Traylor	5 ft 9 in (1.75 m)	Fr	Martinsville	Martinsville, IN
G	25	Tamara Farquhar	6 ft 0 in (1.83 m)	So	Dawson College	Pierrefonds, Quebec
F	30	Nyagoa Gony	6 ft 2 in (1.88 m)	Fr	Lincoln	Lincoln, NE
F	32	Ae'Rianna Harris	6 ft 1 in (1.85 m)	Jr	Lawrence North	Indianapolis, IN
C	45	Fatou Diagne	6 ft 4 in (1.93 m)	RS Jr	Kocc Barma	Thiès, Senegal

Head coach

- Sharon Versyp (Purdue)

Assistant coach(es)

- Nadine Morgan (James Madison)
- Beth Couture (Erskine)
- Lindsay Wisdom-Hylton (Purdue)

Legend

- (C) Team captain
- (S) Suspended
- (I) Ineligible
- (W) Walk-on
- Injured
- Current redshirt

Roster

== Schedule ==
Date time, TV	Rank^{#}	Opponent^{#}	Result	Record	Site (attendance) city, state
Exhibition
Nov 4, 2018*; 2:00 pm		Ashland	W 85–69		Mackey Arena (6,185); West Lafayette, IN
Non-conference regular season
Nov 7, 2018*; 7:00 pm, ESPN+		at Ball State	W 80–38	1–0	Worthen Arena (3,104); Muncie, IN
Nov 11, 2018*; 2:00 pm		Harvard	W 66–65	2–0	Mackey Arena (5,884); West Lafayette, IN
Nov 15, 2018*; 7:00 pm, BTN		Western Illinois	W 81–60	3–0	Mackey Arena (5,816); West Lafayette, IN
Nov 18, 2018*; 2:00 pm		Purdue Fort Wayne	W 78–44	4–0	Mackey Arena (5,970); West Lafayette, IN
Nov 22, 2018*; 5:30 pm		vs. St. John's; Paradise Jam Tournament Reef Division	L 62–68	4–1	Sports and Fitness Center (2,162); Saint Thomas, USVI
Nov 23, 2018*; 5:30 pm		vs. Ole Miss; Paradise Jam Tournament Reef Division	W 70–59	5–1	Sports and Fitness Center (2,373); Saint Thomas, USVI
Nov 24, 2018*; 7:30 pm		vs. No. 2 UConn; Paradise Jam Tournament Reef Division	L 40–86	5–2	Sports and Fitness Center (2,703); Saint Thomas, USVI
Nov 29, 2018*; 7:00 pm		No. 21 Miami (FL); ACC–Big Ten Women's Challenge	W 74–63	6–2	Mackey Arena (5,831); West Lafayette, IN
Dec 5, 2018*; 7:00 pm, ESPN+		at Ohio	L 73–80	6–3	Convocation Center (591); Athens, OH
Dec 9, 2018*; 7:00 pm		Loyola–Chicago	W 65–41	7–3	Mackey Arena (6,047); West Lafayette, IN
Dec 16, 2018*; 3:00 pm, ESPN2		No. 25 South Carolina	L 73–82 ^{2OT}	7–4	Mackey Arena (10,086); West Lafayette, IN
Dec 19, 2018*; 11:30 am		Albany	W 53–41	8–4	Mackey Arena (7,038); West Lafayette, IN
Dec 21, 2018*; 12:00 pm		Bradley	W 74–61	9–4	Mackey Arena (5,491); West Lafayette, IN
Big Ten conference season
Dec 28, 2018; 4:00 pm, BTN		Ohio State	W 60–42	10–4 (1–0)	Mackey Arena (6,313); West Lafayette, IN
Dec 31, 2018; 3:00 pm		at Wisconsin	L 69–76	10–5 (1–1)	Kohl Center (3,982); Madison, WI
Jan 5, 2019; 6:00 pm, BTN		Michigan	W 71–70	11–5 (2–1)	Mackey Arena (6,446); West Lafayette, IN
Jan 10, 2019; 8:00 pm, BTN		No. 17 Iowa	W 62–57	12–5 (3–1)	Mackey Arena (5,843); West Lafayette, IN
Jan 13, 2019; 5:00 pm, BTN		at Northwestern	W 57–54	13–5 (4–1)	Welsh–Ryan Arena (1,349); Evansville, IL
Jan 16, 2019; 7:00 pm		at No. 20 Rutgers	L 63–65 ^{OT}	13–6 (4–2)	Louis Brown Athletic Center (1,419); Piscataway, NJ
Jan 20, 2019; 2:00 pm		No. 25 Indiana; Rivalry/Crimson and Gold Cup	W 56–53	14–6 (5–2)	Mackey Arena (8,657); West Lafayette, IN
Jan 24, 2019; 8:00 pm		at Minnesota	W 64–53	15–6 (6–2)	Williams Arena (5,572); Minneapolis, MN
Jan 27, 2019; 3:00 pm		at No. 17 Iowa	L 58–72	15–7 (6–3)	Carver–Hawkeye Arena (9,319); Iowa City, IA
Jan 31, 2019; 8:00 pm, BTN		Nebraska	L 64–84	15–8 (6–4)	Mackey Arena (5,901); West Lafayette, IN
Feb 3, 2019; 2:00 pm, BTN		at No. 22 Michigan State	L 66–74	15–9 (6–5)	Breslin Center (7,450); East Lansing, MI
Feb 7, 2019; 7:00 pm		Illinois	W 72–50	16–9 (7–5)	Mackey Arena (6,024); West Lafayette, IN
Feb 10, 2019; 3:00 pm		at Nebraska	L 61–67	16–10 (7–6)	Pinnacle Bank Arena (4,298); Lincoln, NE
Feb 14, 2019; 6:00 pm, BTN		Minnesota	L 45–65	16–11 (7–7)	Mackey Arena (6,126); West Lafayette, IN
Feb 17, 2019; 6:00 pm, BTN		Northwestern	W 61–58	17–11 (8–7)	Mackey Arena (7,265); West Lafayette, IN
Feb 21, 2019; 7:00 pm		at Penn State	L 61–72	17–12 (8–8)	Bryce Jordan Center (2,049); University Park, PA
Feb 25, 2019; 6:30 pm, BTN		No. 8 Maryland	L 55–58	17–13 (8–9)	Mackey Arena (6,009); West Lafayette, IN
Mar 3, 2019; 12:00 pm, BTN		at Indiana; Rivalry/Crimson and Gold Cup	L 51–73	17–14 (8–10)	Simon Skjodt Assembly Hall (5,857); Bloomington, IN
Big Ten Women's Tournament
Mar 6, 2019; 4:00 pm, BTN	(11)	vs. (14) Illinois; First Round	W 72–60	18–14	Bankers Life Fieldhouse (3,014); Indianapolis, IN
Mar 7, 2019; 9:00 pm, BTN	(11)	vs. (6) Nebraska; Second Round	W 75–71	19–14	Bankers Life Fieldhouse (3,445); Indianapolis, IN
Mar 8, 2019; 9:00 pm, BTN	(11)	vs. (3) Rutgers; Quarterfinals	L 49–64	19–15	Bankers Life Fieldhouse (4,325); Indianapolis, IN
*Non-conference game. ^{#}Rankings from AP Poll. (#) Tournament seedings in parentheses. All times are in Eastern Time.

== Rankings ==
Regular season polls
Poll	Pre- season	Week 2	Week 3	Week 4	Week 5	Week 6	Week 7	Week 8	Week 9	Week 10	Week 11	Week 12	Week 13	Week 14	Week 15	Week 16	Week 17	Week 18	Week 19	Final
AP					RV						RV									N/A
Coaches											RV	RV								

Legend
	Increase in ranking
	Decrease in ranking
	Not ranked previous week
(RV)	Received votes

== See also ==
- 2018–19 Purdue Boilermakers men's basketball team
