= 2018–19 Indiana Hoosiers women's basketball team =

Intercollegiate basketball season

2018–19 Indiana Hoosiers women's basketball

NCAA tournament, second round
- Conference: Big Ten Conference
- Record: 21–13 (8–10 Big Ten)
- Head coach: Teri Moren (5th season)
- Assistant coaches: Rhet Wierzba; Janese Banks; Glenn Box
- Home arena: Simon Skjodt Assembly Hall

2018–19 Big Ten women's basketball standings
	Conf.				Overall
Team	W		L	PCT	W		L	PCT
No. 9 Maryland	15	–	3	.833	29	–	5	.853
No. 8 Iowa †	14	–	4	.778	29	–	7	.806
Rutgers	13	–	5	.722	22	–	10	.688
Michigan	11	–	7	.611	22	–	12	.647
Ohio State	10	–	8	.556	14	–	15	.483
Minnesota	9	–	9	.500	21	–	11	.656
Michigan State	9	–	9	.500	21	–	12	.636
Northwestern	9	–	9	.500	21	–	15	.583
Nebraska	9	–	9	.500	14	–	16	.467
Indiana	8	–	10	.444	21	–	13	.618
Purdue	8	–	10	.444	19	–	15	.559
Penn State	5	–	13	.278	12	–	18	.400
Wisconsin	4	–	14	.222	15	–	18	.455
Illinois	2	–	16	.111	10	–	20	.333
† 2019 Big Ten tournament winner Rankings from AP poll

The 2018–19 Indiana Hoosiers women's basketball team represented Indiana University Bloomington during the 2018–19 NCAA Division I women's basketball season. The Hoosiers were led by fifth year head coach Teri Moren and played their home games at Simon Skjodt Assembly Hall as a member of the Big Ten Conference. They finished the season 21–13, 8–10 in Big Ten play to finish in a tie for tenth place. They advanced to the quarterfinals of the Big Ten women's tournament, where they lost to Iowa. They received an at-large bid to the NCAA women's basketball tournament, where they defeated Texas in the first round before losing to Oregon in the second round.

== Roster ==
2018–19 Indiana Hoosiers women's basketball team
Players
Coaches

Pos.	#	Name	Height	Year	Previous school	Hometown
G	1	Bendu Yeaney	5 ft 10 in (1.78 m)	So	St. Mary's Academy	Portland, OR
G	2	Keyanna Warthen	5 ft 10 in (1.78 m)	So	Fort Lauderdale	Fort Lauderdale, FL
G	4	Chanel Wilson	5 ft 6 in (1.68 m)	Fr	McEachern	Powder Springs, GA
G	5	Grace Withrow (W)	5 ft 6 in (1.68 m)	Sr	Valparaiso	Valparaiso, IN
F	10	Aleksa Gulbe	6 ft 3 in (1.91 m)	Fr	TTT Riga	Riga, Latvia
F	11	Kym Royster	6 ft 2 in (1.88 m)	Sr	Newark	Newark, OH
C	12	Linsey Marchese	6 ft 4 in (1.93 m)	So	Archer	Dacula, GA
G	13	Jaelynn Penn	5 ft 10 in (1.78 m)	So	Butler	Louisville, KY
G	14	Ali Patberg	5 ft 11 in (1.8 m)	RS Jr	Columbus North; Notre Dame	Columbus, IN
F	23	Alexis Johnson	6 ft 1 in (1.85 m)	So	The Kinkaid School	Houston, TX
G	34	Grace Berger	6 ft 0 in (1.83 m)	Fr	Sacred Heart	Louisville, KY
F	50	Brenna Wise	6 ft 0 in (1.83 m)	Jr	Vincentian Academy; Pittsburgh	Pittsburgh, PA

Head coach

- Teri Moren (Purdue)

Assistant coach(es)

- Rhet Wierzba (Austin Peay)
- Janese Constantine (Wisconsin)
- Glenn Box (Southeast Missouri State)

Legend

- (C) Team captain
- (S) Suspended
- (I) Ineligible
- (W) Walk-on
- Injured
- Current redshirt

Roster

== Schedule ==
Date time, TV	Rank^{#}	Opponent^{#}	Result	Record	Site (attendance) city, state
Exhibition
11/02/2018*; 7:00 pm		Northwood	W 78–52		Simon Skjodt Assembly Hall (1,367); Bloomington, IN
Non-conference regular season
11/07/2018*; 7:00 pm		Milwaukee	W 68–66	1–0	Simon Skjodt Assembly Hall (3,060); Bloomington, IN
11/11/2018*; 1:00 pm		at Oakland	W 59–32	2–0	Athletics Center O'rena (819); Rochester, MI
11/18/2018*; 2:00 pm		North Florida	W 75–52	3–0	Simon Skjodt Assembly Hall (3,298); Bloomington, IN
11/21/2018*; 2:00 pm		Florida	W 83–64	4–0	Simon Skjodt Assembly Hall (3,345); Bloomington, IN
11/25/2018*; 2:00 pm		Northern Illinois	W 91–73	5–0	Simon Skjodt Assembly Hall (3,415); Bloomington, IN
11/28/2018*; 2:00 pm		at Wake Forest; ACC–Big Ten Women's Challenge	W 87–73	6–0	LJVM Coliseum (397); Winston-Salem, NC
12/02/2018*; 4:00 pm, P12N		at UCLA	W 67–65	7–0	Pauley Pavilion (3,511); Los Angeles, CA
12/05/2018*; 7:00 pm		Butler	W 66–46	8–0	Simon Skjodt Assembly Hall (3,642); Bloomington, IN
12/09/2018*; 12:00 pm, BTN		Missouri State	W 98–74	9–0	Simon Skjodt Assembly Hall (3,463); Bloomington, IN
12/19/2018*; 4:00 pm		vs. Loyola Marymount; Puerto Rico Classic	W 67–43	10–0	Mario Morales Coliseum; Guaynabo, PR
12/20/2018*; 1:30 pm		vs. Grambling State; Puerto Rico Classic	L 62–65	10–1	Mario Morales Coliseum; Guaynabo, PR
12/21/2018*; 4:00 pm		vs. South Dakota; Puerto Rico Classic	W 68–60	11–1	Mario Morales Coliseum (150); Guaynabo, PR
Big Ten regular Season
12/28/2018; 8:00 pm		at Illinois	W 85–83 ^{OT}	12–1 (1–0)	State Farm Center (1,622); Champaign, IL
12/31/2018; 7:00 pm		Penn State	W 83–75	13–1 (2–0)	Simon Skjodt Assembly Hall (4,481); Bloomington, IN
01/06/2019; 2:00 pm		No. 15 Michigan State	W 68–64	14–1 (3–0)	Simon Skjodt Assembly Hall (6,380); Bloomington, IN
01/10/2019; 6:00 pm, BTN	No. 25	at Ohio State	L 50–55	14–2 (3–1)	Value City Arena (3,557); Columbus, OH
01/13/2019; 3:00 pm	No. 25	at Wisconsin	W 75–68	15–2 (4–1)	Kohl Center (6,092); Madison, WI
01/16/2019; 7:00 pm	No. 25	Northwestern	L 69–75	15–3 (4–2)	Simon Skjodt Assembly Hall (3,352); Bloomington, IN
01/20/2019; 2:00 pm	No. 25	at Purdue; Rivalry/Crimson and Gold Cup	L 53–56	15–4 (4–3)	Mackey Arena (8,657); West Lafayette, IN
01/24/2019; 6:00 pm, BTN		Michigan	W 70–60	16–4 (5–3)	Simon Sjodt Assembly Hall (3,411); Bloomington, IN
01/27/2019; 12:00 pm, BTN		No. 11 Maryland	L 56–76	16–5 (5–4)	Simon Sjodt Assembly Hall (4,555); Bloomington, IN
01/31/2019; 12:00 pm		at No. 17 Rutgers	L 64–69	16–6 (5–5)	Louis Brown Athletic Center (1,776); Piscataway, NJ
02/03/2019; 3:00 pm		at Nebraska	W 82–78	17–6 (6–5)	Pinnacle Bank Arena (3,893); Lincoln, NE
02/06/2019; 7:00 pm		Minnesota	L 61–65	17–7 (6–6)	Simon Sjodt Assembly Hall (3,398); Bloomington, IN
02/11/2019; 7:00 pm, BTN		at No. 24 Michigan State	L 61–77	17–8 (6–7)	Breslin Center (3,542); East Lansing, MI
02/14/2019; 7:00 pm		at Michigan	L 58–67	17–9 (6–8)	Crisler Center (2,328); Ann Arbor, MI
02/18/2019; 7:00 pm, BTN		Rutgers	L 61–69	17–10 (6–9)	Simon Sjodt Assembly Hall (3,324); Bloomington, IN
02/21/2019; 8:00 pm, BTN		No. 10 Iowa	W 75–73	18–10 (7–9)	Simon Sjodt Assembly Hall (3,812); Bloomington, IN
02/26/2019; 8:00 pm		at Northwestern	L 49–69	18–11 (7–10)	Welsh–Ryan Arena (531); Evanston, IL
03/03/2019; 12:00 pm, BTN		Purdue; Rivalry/Crimson and Gold Cup	W 73–51	19–11 (8–10)	Simon Skjodt Assembly Hall (5,854); Bloomington, IN
Big Ten Women's Tournament
03/07/2019; 6:30 pm, BTN	(10)	vs. (7) Minnesota; Second Round	W 66–58	20–11	Bankers Life Fieldhouse; Indianapolis, IN
03/08/2019; 6:30 pm, BTN	(10)	vs. (2) No. 10 Iowa; Quarterfinals	L 61–70	20–12	Bankers Life Fieldhouse; Indianapolis, IN
NCAA Women's Tournament
03/22/2019*; 7:00 pm, ESPN2	(10 P)	vs. (7 P) No. 23 Texas; First Round	W 69–65	21–12	Matthew Knight Arena; Eugene, OR
03/24/2019*; 9:00 pm, ESPN2	(10 P)	at (2 P) No. 7 Oregon; Second Round	L 68–91	21–13	Matthew Knight Arena (6,729); Eugene, OR
*Non-conference game. ^{#}Rankings from AP Poll. (#) Tournament seedings in parentheses. P=Portland Region. All times are in Eastern Time.

== Rankings ==
Ranking movement Legend: ██ Increase in ranking. ██ Decrease in ranking. NR = Not ranked. RV = Received votes.
Poll	Pre	Wk 2	Wk 3	Wk 4	Wk 5	Wk 6	Wk 7	Wk 8	Wk 9	Wk 10	Wk 11	Wk 12	Wk 13	Wk 14	Wk 15	Wk 16	Wk 17	Wk 18	Wk 19	Final
AP					RV	RV	RV	RV	RV	25	25	RV								N/A
Coaches					RV	RV	RV	RV	RV	RV	RV									

== See also ==
2018–19 Indiana Hoosiers men's basketball team
