= 2018–19 Illinois Fighting Illini women's basketball team =

Intercollegiate basketball season

2018–19 Illinois Fighting Illini women's basketball
- Conference: Big Ten Conference
- Record: 10–20 (2–16 Big Ten)
- Head coach: Nancy Fahey (2nd season)
- Assistant coaches: LaKale Malone; Tianna Kirkland; Steve Cochran
- Home arena: State Farm Center

2018–19 Big Ten women's basketball standings
	Conf.				Overall
Team	W		L	PCT	W		L	PCT
No. 9 Maryland	15	–	3	.833	29	–	5	.853
No. 8 Iowa †	14	–	4	.778	29	–	7	.806
Rutgers	13	–	5	.722	22	–	10	.688
Michigan	11	–	7	.611	22	–	12	.647
Ohio State	10	–	8	.556	14	–	15	.483
Minnesota	9	–	9	.500	21	–	11	.656
Michigan State	9	–	9	.500	21	–	12	.636
Northwestern	9	–	9	.500	21	–	15	.583
Nebraska	9	–	9	.500	14	–	16	.467
Indiana	8	–	10	.444	21	–	13	.618
Purdue	8	–	10	.444	19	–	15	.559
Penn State	5	–	13	.278	12	–	18	.400
Wisconsin	4	–	14	.222	15	–	18	.455
Illinois	2	–	16	.111	10	–	20	.333
† 2019 Big Ten tournament winner Rankings from AP poll

The 2018–19 Illinois Fighting Illini women's basketball team represented the University of Illinois during the 2018–19 NCAA Division I women's basketball season. The Fighting Illini, led by second-year head coach Nancy Fahey, played their home games at State Farm Center as members of the Big Ten Conference. They finished the season 10–20, 2–16 in Big Ten play to finish in last place. They lost in the first round of the Big Ten women's tournament to Purdue.

== Roster ==
2018–19 Illinois Fighting Illini women's basketball team
Players
Coaches

Pos.	#	Name	Height	Year	Previous school	Hometown
G	0	J-Naya Ephraim	5 ft 9 in (1.75 m)	Fr	Southern Durham	Saint Croix, USVI
G	1	Brandi Beasley	5 ft 6 in (1.68 m)	Jr	Ridgeway	Memphis, TN
F	2	Lyric Robins	5 ft 11 in (1.8 m)	So	Plano West	Plano, TX
G	3	Arieal Scott	5 ft 9 in (1.75 m)	Fr	Urbana	Urbana, IL
F	4	Mackenzie Blazek	6 ft 3 in (1.91 m)	Fr	Whiteland Community	Franklin, IN
G	5	Cierra Rice	5 ft 9 in (1.75 m)	RS Jr	Grosse Pointe South	Gross Pointe, MI
G	11	Carolyn Waleski	5 ft 10 in (1.78 m)	Fr	Lincoln-Way East	Frankfort, IL
G	13	Petra Holešínská	5 ft 9 in (1.75 m)	Jr	Sportovni Gzmnazium Ludvika Danka	Vracov, Czech Republic
F	21	Nancy Panagiotopoulou Andritsopoulou	6 ft 3 in (1.91 m)	RS Fr	American Community Schools of Athens	Athens, Greece
G	23	Jaelyne Kirkpatrick	5 ft 7 in (1.7 m)	Sr	St. Ignatius of Loyola	Oakville, Ontario
G	30	Courtney Joens	5 ft 10 in (1.78 m)	Jr	City High	Iowa City, IA
F	31	Sarah Shewan	6 ft 2 in (1.88 m)	RS Sr	St. Thomas Aquinas Catholic; Quinnipiac	Russell, ON
G	33	Meagan McNicholas	5 ft 10 in (1.78 m)	Jr	Rochester	Rochester, IL
F	35	Alex Wittinger	6 ft 1 in (1.85 m)	Sr	Delano	Delano, MN
F	50	Ali Andrews	6 ft 2 in (1.88 m)	Jr	Huntley	Lake in the Hills, IL

Head coach

- Nancy Fahey (Wisconsin)

Assistant coach(es)

- LaKale Malone (Indiana)
- Tianna Kirkland (Ferris State)
- Steve Cochran (Missouri–St. Louis)

Legend

- (C) Team captain
- (S) Suspended
- (I) Ineligible
- (W) Walk-on
- Injured
- Current redshirt

Roster

== Schedule and results ==
Date time, TV	Rank^{#}	Opponent^{#}	Result	Record	Site (attendance) city, state
Non-conference regular season
11/07/2018*; 11:00 am		Alabama A&M	W 88–60	1–0	State Farm Center (2,364); Champaign, IL
11/14/2018*; 7:00 pm		Valparaiso	W 73–54	2–0	State Farm Center (1,163); Champaign, IL
11/18/2018*; 1:00 pm		Columbia	W 76–69	3–0	State Farm Center (1,439); Champaign, IL
11/23/2018*; 4:00 pm		at Cal Poly; ShareSLO Holiday Beach Classic	W 74–51	4–0	Mott Athletics Center (548); San Luis Obispo, CA
11/24/2018*; 4:00 pm		vs. Sacramento State; ShareSLO Holiday Beach Classic	L 107–109	4–1	Mott Athletics Center (152); San Luis Obispo, CA
11/28/2018*; 6:00 pm		at Clemson; ACC–Big Ten Women's Challenge	L 67–69 ^{OT}	4–2	Littlejohn Coliseum (412); Clemson, SC
12/01/2018*; 2:00 pm		Eastern Michigan	W 72–66 ^{OT}	5–2	State Farm Center (1,383); Champaign, IL
12/05/2018*; 7:00 pm		Indiana State	W 75–57	6–2	State Farm Center (981); Champaign, IL
12/11/2018*; 7:00 pm		Murray State	W 84–52	7–2	State Farm Center (986); Champaign, IL
12/15/2018*; 6:00 pm		SIU Edwardsville	W 74–57	8–2	State Farm Center (1,335); Champaign, IL
12/21/2018*; 12:00 pm		Missouri	L 45–67	8–3	State Farm Center (1,288); Champaign, IL
Big Ten conference season
12/28/2018; 7:00 pm		Indiana	L 83–85 ^{OT}	8–4 (0–1)	State Farm Center (1,622); Champaign, IL
12/31/2018; 2:00 pm, BTN		at Northwestern	L 45–68	8–5 (0–2)	Welsh–Ryan Arena (1,129); Evanston, IL
01/06/2019; 3:00 pm		at No. 12 Minnesota	W 66–62	9–5 (1–2)	Williams Arena (6,622); Minneapolis, MN
01/09/2019; 7:00 pm		Rutgers	L 60–71	9–6 (1–3)	State Farm Center (1,150); Champaign, IL
01/12/2019; 1:00 pm		at Penn State	L 48–62	9–7 (1–4)	Bryce Jordan Center (2,472); University Park, PA
01/17/2019; 7:00 pm		Nebraska	L 67–77	9–8 (1–5)	State Farm Center (1,349); Champaign, IL
01/20/2019; 2:00 pm		No. 22 Iowa	L 75–94	9–9 (1–6)	State Farm Center (3,019); Champaign, IL
01/24/2019; 6:00 pm		No. 23 Michigan State	L 60–77	9–10 (1–7)	State Farm Center (4,745); Champaign, IL
01/27/2019; 2:00 pm		Northwestern	L 56–64	9–11 (1–8)	State Farm Center (1,532); Champaign, IL
01/31/2019; 6:00 pm		at Ohio State	L 70–78	9–12 (1–9)	Value City Arena (3,804); Columbus, OH
02/04/2019; 6:30 pm, BTN		No. 10 Maryland	L 66–80	9–13 (1–10)	State Farm Center (1,088); Champaign, IL
02/07/2019; 6:00 pm		at Purdue	L 50–72	9–14 (1–11)	Mackey Arena (6,024); West Lafayette, IN
02/10/2019; 2:00 pm		Wisconsin	W 78–68	10–14 (2–11)	State Farm Center (1,844); Champaign, IL
02/14/2019; 7:00 pm		at No. 14 Iowa	L 66–88	10–15 (2–12)	Carver–Hawkeye Arena (6,877); Iowa City, IA
02/17/2019; 2:00 pm		Michigan	L 56–70	10–16 (2–13)	State Farm Center (1,609); Champaign, IL
02/20/2019; 7:00 pm		at Wisconsin	L 67–75	10–17 (2–14)	Kohl Center (3,866); Madison, WI
02/24/2019; 3:00 pm, BTN		Penn State	L 65–76	10–18 (2–15)	State Farm Center (1,532); Champaign, IL
03/02/2019; 1:00 pm		at No. 8 Maryland	L 62–71	10–19 (2–16)	Xfinity Center (8,638); College Park, MD
Big Ten Women's Tournament
03/06/2019; 3:00 pm, BTN	(14)	vs. (11) Purdue; First Round	L 60–72	10–20	Bankers Life Fieldhouse (3,014); Indianapolis, IN
*Non-conference game. ^{#}Rankings from AP Poll. (#) Tournament seedings in parentheses. All times are in Central Time.

== Rankings ==
Regular season polls
Poll	Pre- Season	Week 2	Week 3	Week 4	Week 5	Week 6	Week 7	Week 8	Week 9	Week 10	Week 11	Week 12	Week 13	Week 14	Week 15	Week 16	Week 17	Week 18	Week 19	Final
AP																				N/A
Coaches	RV																			

Legend
	Increase in ranking
	Decrease in ranking
	Not ranked previous week
(RV)	Received Votes

== See also ==
- 2018–19 Illinois Fighting Illini men's basketball team
