= 2018–19 Ohio State Buckeyes women's basketball team =

Intercollegiate basketball season

2018–19 Ohio State Buckeyes women's basketball

WNIT, First Round
- Conference: Big Ten Conference
- Record: 14–15 (10–8 Big Ten)
- Head coach: Kevin McGuff (6th season)
- Assistant coaches: Patrick Klein; Carrie Banks; Jennifer Sullivan
- Home arena: Value City Arena

2018–19 Big Ten women's basketball standings
	Conf.				Overall
Team	W		L	PCT	W		L	PCT
No. 9 Maryland	15	–	3	.833	29	–	5	.853
No. 8 Iowa †	14	–	4	.778	29	–	7	.806
Rutgers	13	–	5	.722	22	–	10	.688
Michigan	11	–	7	.611	22	–	12	.647
Ohio State	10	–	8	.556	14	–	15	.483
Minnesota	9	–	9	.500	21	–	11	.656
Michigan State	9	–	9	.500	21	–	12	.636
Northwestern	9	–	9	.500	21	–	15	.583
Nebraska	9	–	9	.500	14	–	16	.467
Indiana	8	–	10	.444	21	–	13	.618
Purdue	8	–	10	.444	19	–	15	.559
Penn State	5	–	13	.278	12	–	18	.400
Wisconsin	4	–	14	.222	15	–	18	.455
Illinois	2	–	16	.111	10	–	20	.333
† 2019 Big Ten tournament winner Rankings from AP poll

The 2018–19 Ohio State Buckeyes women's basketball team represented the Ohio State University during the 2018–19 NCAA Division I women's basketball season. The Buckeyes, led by 6th -ear head coach Kevin McGuff, played their home games at Value City Arena and were a member of the Big Ten Conference. They finished the season 14–15, 10–8 in Big Ten play to finish in fifth place. They lost in the second round of the Big Ten women's basketball tournament to Wisconsin. They received an automatic bid to the WNIT, where they were upset by Morehead State in the first round.

== Roster ==
2018–19 Ohio State Buckeyes women's basketball team
Players
Coaches

Pos.	#	Name	Height	Year	Previous school	Hometown
G	1	Carmen Grande	5 ft 8 in (1.73 m)	Sr	Ball State	Madrid, Spain
G	2	Ashanti Grande	5 ft 9 in (1.75 m)	RS Sr	Cleveland Heights; Cleveland State	Cleveland Heights, OH
G	3	Janai Crooms	5 ft 10 in (1.78 m)	Fr	St. Andrew's	Cranston, RI
G	10	Carly Santoro	5 ft 10 in (1.78 m)	Sr	Bellevue; Bowling Green	Bellevue, OH
F	12	Savita Jayaraman	6 ft 2 in (1.88 m)	So	Olentangy Liberty	Powell, OH
F	14	Dorka Juhász	6 ft 4 in (1.93 m)	Fr	PTE Babits	Pécs, Hungary
G	15	Adreana Miller	5 ft 11 in (1.8 m)	Sr	Franklin; La Salle	Somerset, NJ
G	23	Najah Queenland	5 ft 10 in (1.78 m)	Sr	Sacramento; Pacific	Sacramento, CA
F	24	Makayla Waterman	6 ft 2 in (1.88 m)	RS Sr	Fairmont	Kettering, OH
G	25	Karlie Cronin	5 ft 8 in (1.73 m)	Sr	Oakton	Oakton, VA
F	32	Aaliyah Patty	6 ft 3 in (1.91 m)	Fr	Montini Catholic	Lombard, IL
G	33	Jensen Caretti	6 ft 1 in (1.85 m)	Jr	River	Clarington, OH

Head coach

- Kevin McGuff (Saint Joseph's (IN))

Assistant coach(es)

- Patrick Klein (Ohio State)
- Carrie Banks (Detroit Mercy)
- Jennifer Sullivan (Memphis)

Legend

- (C) Team captain
- (S) Suspended
- (I) Ineligible
- (W) Walk-on
- Injured
- Current redshirt

Roster

== Schedule and results ==
Date time, TV	Rank^{#}	Opponent^{#}	Result	Record	Site (attendance) city, state
Exhibition
10/28/2018*; 2:00 pm		IUP	W 72–50		Value City Arena (3,310); Columbus, OH
Non-conference regular season
11/06/2018*; 7:00 pm		No. 22 South Florida	L 47–71	0–1	Value City Arena (3,472); Columbus, OH
11/09/2018*; 7:00 pm		Detroit Mercy	W 55–41	1–1	Value City Arena (3,937); Columbus, OH
11/11/2018*; 12:00 pm, CBSSN		at No. 2 Connecticut	L 53–85	1–2	Harry A. Gampel Pavilion (8,828); Storrs, CT
11/16/2018*; 11:30 pm		at Sacramento State	Postponed		Hornets Nest; Sacramento, CA
11/18/2018*; 4:00 pm, P12N		at No. 7 Stanford	Cancelled		Maples Pavilion; Stanford, CA
11/29/2018*; 7:00 pm		North Carolina; ACC–Big Ten Women's Challenge	W 76–69	2–2	Value City Arena (4,997); Columbus, OH
12/02/2018*; 2:00 pm		Cincinnati	W 69–56	3–2	Value City Arena (4,825); Columbus, OH
12/05/2018*; 11:00 pm, P12N		at Washington	L 59–69	3–3	Alaska Airlines Arena (1,236); Seattle, WA
12/16/2018*; 1:00 pm		Florida	W 46–41	4–3	Value City Arena (4,585); Columbus, OH
12/20/2018*; 12:15 pm		vs. Butler; West Palm Invitational	L 53–66	4–4	Student Life Center (250); West Palm Beach, FL
12/21/2018*; 12:15 pm		vs. Virginia Tech; West Palm Invitational	L 73–81	4–5	Student Life Center (127); West Palm Beach, FL
Big Ten regular season
12/28/2018; 4:00 pm, BTN		at Purdue	L 42–60	4–6 (0–1)	Mackey Arena (6,313); West Lafayette, IN
12/31/2018; 1:00 pm, BTN		Nebraska	L 69–78	4–7 (0–2)	Value City Arena (5,530); Columbus, OH
01/05/2019; 4:00 pm, BTN		at No. 4 Maryland	L 69–75	4–8 (0–3)	Xfinity Center (6,731); College Park, MD
01/10/2019; 4:00 pm, BTN		No. 25 Indiana	W 55–50	5–8 (1–3)	Value City Arena (3,557); Columbus, OH
01/14/2019; 7:00 pm, BTN		No. 17 Michigan State	W 65–55	6–8 (2–3)	Value City Arena (4,695); Columbus, OH
01/17/2019; 7:00 pm		at Penn State	W 76–71 ^{OT}	7–8 (3–3)	Bryce Jordan Center (2,090); University Park, PA
01/20/2019; 3:00 pm, BTN		at Michigan; Rivalry	L 58–62	7–9 (3–4)	Crisler Center (5,422); Ann Arbor, MI
01/24/2019; 8:00 pm, BTN		No. 11 Maryland	L 57–70	7–10 (3–5)	Value City Arena (3,962); Columbus, OH
01/28/2019; 7:30 pm, BTN		at Minnesota	W 65–55	8–10 (4–5)	Williams Arena (3,470); Minneapolis, MN
01/31/2019; 7:00 pm		Illinois	W 78–70	9–10 (5–5)	Value City Arena (3,804); Columbus, OH
02/03/2019; 4:30 pm		at Northwestern	L 59–76	9–11 (5–6)	Welsh–Ryan Arena (1,283); Evanston, IN
02/06/2019; 7:00 pm		Penn State	W 78–73	10–11 (6–6)	Value City Arena (4,264); Columbus, OH
02/10/2019; 4:00 pm, BTN		No. 16 Iowa	L 52–78	10–12 (6–7)	Value City Arena (5,344); Columbus, OH
02/14/2019; 7:00 pm		at No. 23 Rutgers	W 59–39	11–12 (7–7)	Louis Brown Athletic Center (1,849); Piscataway, NJ
02/17/2019; 2:00 pm		Wisconsin	W 70–68	12–12 (8–7)	Value City Arena (5,931); Columbus, OH
02/21/2019; 6:00 pm, BTN		at Michigan State	W 77–70	13–12 (9–7)	Breslin Center (4,857); East Lansing, MI
02/28/2019; 9:00 pm, BTN		at Wisconsin	W 61–50	14–12 (10–7)	Kohl Center (3,529); Madison, WI
03/03/2019; 2:00 pm, BTN		Rutgers	L 56–66	14–13 (10–8)	Value City Arena (5,030); Columbus, OH
Big Ten Women's Tournament
03/08/2019; 2:30 pm, BTN	(5)	vs. (13) Wisconsin; Second Round	L 63–73	14–14	Bankers Life Fieldhouse (3,173); Indianapolis, IN
WNIT
03/20/2019*; 7:00 pm		Morehead State; First Round	L 61–71	14–15	Value City Arena (1,114); Columbus, OH
*Non-conference game. ^{#}Rankings from AP Poll. (#) Tournament seedings in parentheses. All times are in Eastern Time.

== Rankings ==
Regular season polls
Poll	Pre- season	Week 2	Week 3	Week 4	Week 5	Week 6	Week 7	Week 8	Week 9	Week 10	Week 11	Week 12	Week 13	Week 14	Week 15	Week 16	Week 17	Week 18	Week 19	Final
AP																				N/A
Coaches	RV																			

Legend
	Increase in ranking
	Decrease in ranking
	Not ranked previous week
(RV)	Received votes

== See also ==
- 2018–19 Ohio State Buckeyes men's basketball team
