= 2018–19 Florida Gators women's basketball team =

Intercollegiate basketball season

2018–19 Florida Gators women's basketball
- Conference: Southeastern Conference
- Record: 8–23 (3–13 SEC)
- Head coach: Cameron Newbauer (2nd season)
- Assistant coaches: Kelly Rae Finley; Laura Harper; John McCray
- Home arena: O'Connell Center

2018–19 SEC women's basketball standings
	Conf.				Overall
Team	W		L	PCT	W		L	PCT
No. 4 Mississippi State †	15	–	1	.938	33	–	3	.917
No. 15 South Carolina	13	–	3	.813	23	–	9	.719
No. 14 Texas A&M	12	–	4	.750	26	–	7	.788
No. 17 Kentucky	11	–	5	.688	25	–	8	.758
Missouri	10	–	6	.625	24	–	11	.686
Auburn	9	–	7	.563	22	–	10	.688
Georgia	9	–	7	.563	18	–	12	.600
Tennessee	7	–	9	.438	19	–	13	.594
LSU	7	–	9	.438	16	–	13	.552
Arkansas	6	–	10	.375	22	–	15	.595
Alabama	5	–	11	.313	14	–	17	.452
Ole Miss	3	–	13	.188	9	–	22	.290
Florida	3	–	13	.188	8	–	23	.258
Vanderbilt	2	–	14	.125	7	–	23	.233
† 2019 SEC tournament winner Rankings from AP poll

The 2018–19 Florida Gators women's basketball team represented the University of Florida in the sport of basketball during the 2018–19 NCAA Division I women's basketball season. The Gators compete in Division I of the National Collegiate Athletic Association (NCAA) and the Southeastern Conference (SEC). The Gators, led by second-year head coach Cameron Newbauer, played their home games in the O'Connell Center on the university's Gainesville, Florida campus. They finished the season 8–23, 3–13 in SEC play to finish in a tie for twelfth place. They defeated Ole Miss in the first round of the SEC women's tournament before losing to Missouri in the second round.

== Previous season ==
They finished the season 11–19, 3–13 in SEC play to finish in a 3 tie for eleventh place. They lost in the first round of the SEC women's tournament to Ole Miss.

== Roster ==
2018–19 Florida Gators women's basketball team
Players
Coaches

Pos.	#	Name	Height	Year	Hometown
G	00	Delicia Washington	5 ft 10 in (1.78 m)	Jr	Macclenny, FL
G	1	Kiara Smith	5 ft 10 in (1.78 m)	So	District Heights, MD
G	3	Funda Nakkaşoğlu	5 ft 8 in (1.73 m)	RS Sr	Hampton, Australia
G	4	Corey Staples	5 ft 8 in (1.73 m)	RS Jr	Buford, Georgia
G	10	Danielle Rainey	5 ft 10 in (1.78 m)	So	Washington, D.C.
G	11	Emanuely de Oliveira	5 ft 10 in (1.78 m)	Fr	Criciúma, Brazil
F	12	Zada Williams	6 ft 2 in (1.88 m)	RS Jr	Babson Park, FL
F	14	Kristina Moore	6 ft 1 in (1.85 m)	Fr	Sydney, Australia
C	30	Emer Nichols	6 ft 5 in (1.96 m)	RS Sr	Pearland, TX
G	32	Ariel Johnson	5 ft 9 in (1.75 m)	Fr	Tracy, CA
F	44	Paige Robinson	6 ft 4 in (1.93 m)	Jr	London, England
F	55	Stephanie Brower	5 ft 11 in (1.8 m)	So	Wesley Chapel, FL

Head coach

- Cameron Newbauer (IUPUI)

Assistant coach(es)

- Kelly Rae Finley (Colorado State)
- Laura Harper (Maryland)
- John McCray (Ohio State)

Legend

- (C) Team captain
- (S) Suspended
- (I) Ineligible
- (W) Walk-on
- Injured
- Current redshirt

Roster
Last update: September 21, 2018

== Schedule ==
Date time, TV	Rank^{#}	Opponent^{#}	Result	Record	Site (attendance) city, state
Non-conference regular season
11/06/2018*; 11:00 am		Gardner–Webb	L 58–60	0–1	O'Connell Center (1,891); Gainesville, FL
11/11/2018*; 3:00 pm, ACCN Extra		at Florida State	L 56–63	0–2	Donald L. Tucker Center (2,994); Tallahassee, FL
11/15/2018*; 7:00 pm		at Mercer	L 82–92	0–3	Hawkins Arena (2,038); Macon, GA
11/18/2018*; 2:00 pm		Northwestern	L 74–83 ^{OT}	0–4	O'Connell Center (1,379); Gainesville, FL
11/21/2018*; 2:00 pm		at Indiana	L 64–83	0–5	Simon Skjodt Assembly Hall (3,345); Bloomington, IN
11/28/2018*; 7:00 pm		Northeastern	L 66–79	0–6	O'Connell Center (1,161); Gainesville, FL
12/02/2018*; 2:00 pm, SECN		Texas Tech; Big 12/SEC Women's Challenge	W 72–67	1–6	O'Connell Center (1,259); Gainesville, FL
12/05/2018*; 7:00 pm		Bethune–Cookman	W 64–53	2–6	O'Connell Center (1,129); Gainesville, FL
12/09/2018*; 2:00 pm		Florida A&M	W 62–38	3–6	O'Connell Center (1,309); Gainesville, FL
12/16/2018*; 1:00 pm		at Ohio State	L 41–46	3–7	Value City Arena (4,585); Columbus, OH
12/20/2018*; 3:00 pm		vs. Utah; Duel in the Desert Rebel Division semifinals	L 58–74	3–8	Cox Pavilion; Paradise, NV
12/21/2018*; 3:00 pm		at UNLV; Duel in the Desert consolation game	L 53–56	3–9	Cox Pavilion; Paradise, NV
12/30/2018*; 2:00 pm		Charleston Southern	W 70–60	4–9	O'Connell Center (1,479); Gainesville, FL
SEC regular season
01/03/2019; 8:00 pm		at Alabama	L 67–74	4–10 (0–1)	Coleman Coliseum (2,514); Tuscaloosa, AL
01/06/2019; 1:00 pm, SECN		Auburn	L 56–64	4–11 (0–2)	O'Connell Center (2,109); Gainesville, FL
01/10/2019; 7:00 pm		at No. 21 South Carolina	L 40–71	4–12 (0–3)	Colonial Life Arena (10,353); Columbia, SC
01/13/2019; 3:00 pm, SECN		Missouri	W 58–56	5–12 (1–3)	O'Connell Center (2,219); Gainesville, FL
01/20/2019; 4:00 pm, SECN		at Ole Miss	L 66–76	5–13 (1–4)	The Pavilion at Ole Miss (1,507); Oxford, MS
01/24/2019; 7:00 pm		No. 7 Mississippi State	L 42–90	5–14 (1–5)	O'Connell Center (1,242); Gainesville, FL
01/27/2019; 2:00 pm		Arkansas	L 73–83	5–15 (1–6)	O'Connell Center (2,009); Gainesville, FL
01/31/2019; 7:00 pm		at Tennessee	L 50–67	5–16 (1–7)	Thompson–Boling Arena (6,233); Knoxville, TN
02/03/2019; 2:00 pm, ESPNU		at No. 19 Kentucky	L 51–62	5–17 (1–8)	Rupp Arena (10,031); Lexington, KY
02/07/2019; 7:00 pm		Alabama	W 57–55	6–17 (2–8)	O'Connell Center (1,206); Gainesville, FL
02/10/2019; 12:00 pm, ESPNU		at Georgia	L 58–93	6–18 (2–9)	Stegeman Coliseum (5,515); Athens, GA
02/17/2019; 2:00 pm		No. 11 South Carolina	L 77–96	6–19 (2–10)	O'Connell Center (3,213); Gainesville, FL
02/21/2019; 6:30 pm		at LSU	L 51–69	6–20 (2–11)	Maravich Center (1,573); Baton Rouge, LA
02/25/2019; 7:00 pm, SECN		Texas A&M	L 62–80	6–21 (2–12)	O'Connell Center (1,009); Gainesville, FL
02/28/2019; 7:00 pm		Georgia	L 57–69	6–22 (2–13)	O'Connell Center (1,062); Gainesville, FL
03/03/2019; 3:00 pm, SECN		at Vanderbilt	W 78–66	7–22 (3–13)	Memorial Gymnasium (2,684); Nashville, TN
SEC Tournament
03/06/2019; 11:00 am, SECN	(13)	vs. (12) Ole Miss; First Round	W 64–57	8–22	Bon Secours Wellness Arena; Greenville, SC
03/07/2019; 2:30 pm, SECN	(13)	vs. (5) Missouri; Second Round	L 56–87	8–23	Bon Secours Wellness Arena; Greenville, SC
*Non-conference game. ^{#}Rankings from AP Poll. (#) Tournament seedings in parentheses. All times are in Eastern Time.
