= 2018–19 Nebraska Cornhuskers women's basketball team =

Intercollegiate basketball season

2018–19 Nebraska Cornhuskers women's basketball
- Conference: Big Ten Conference
- Record: 14–16 (9–9 Big Ten)
- Head coach: Amy Williams (3rd season)
- Assistant coaches: Tom Goehle; Chuck Love; Tandem Mays
- Home arena: Pinnacle Bank Arena

2018–19 Big Ten women's basketball standings
	Conf.				Overall
Team	W		L	PCT	W		L	PCT
No. 9 Maryland	15	–	3	.833	29	–	5	.853
No. 8 Iowa †	14	–	4	.778	29	–	7	.806
Rutgers	13	–	5	.722	22	–	10	.688
Michigan	11	–	7	.611	22	–	12	.647
Ohio State	10	–	8	.556	14	–	15	.483
Minnesota	9	–	9	.500	21	–	11	.656
Michigan State	9	–	9	.500	21	–	12	.636
Northwestern	9	–	9	.500	21	–	15	.583
Nebraska	9	–	9	.500	14	–	16	.467
Indiana	8	–	10	.444	21	–	13	.618
Purdue	8	–	10	.444	19	–	15	.559
Penn State	5	–	13	.278	12	–	18	.400
Wisconsin	4	–	14	.222	15	–	18	.455
Illinois	2	–	16	.111	10	–	20	.333
† 2019 Big Ten tournament winner Rankings from AP poll

The 2018–19 Nebraska Cornhuskers women's basketball team represented the University of Nebraska during the 2018–19 NCAA Division I women's basketball season. The Cornhuskers, led by 3rd year head coach Amy Williams, played their home games at Pinnacle Bank Arena and were a member of the Big Ten Conference. They finished the season 14–16, 11–5 in Big Ten play to finish in a 4 way for sixth place. They lost in the first round of the Big Ten women's tournament to Purdue.

== Roster ==
2018–19 Nebraska Cornhuskers women's basketball team
Players
Coaches

Pos.	#	Name	Height	Year	Previous school	Hometown
G	3	Hannah Whitish	5 ft 9 in (1.75 m)	Jr	Barneveld	Barneveld, WI
G	4	Sam Haiby	5 ft 9 in (1.75 m)	Fr	Moorhead	Moorhead, MN
G	5	Nicea Eliely	6 ft 1 in (1.85 m)	Jr	Rampart	Colorado Springs, CO
G	11	Kristian Hudson	5 ft 5 in (1.65 m)	Sr	Clay-Chalkville; Florida International	Birmingham, AL
F	13	Ashtyn Veerbeek	6 ft 2 in (1.88 m)	Fr	Western Christian	Sioux Center, IA
G/F	14	Grace Mitchell	6 ft 2 in (1.88 m)	Jr	Wellington	Wellington, KS
G	24	Maddie Simon	6 ft 2 in (1.88 m)	Sr	Pius X	Lincoln, NE
C	31	Kate Cain	6 ft 5 in (1.96 m)	So	Pine Bush	Middletown, NY
F	32	Leigha Brown	6 ft 1 in (1.85 m)	Fr	DeKalb	Auburn, IN
G/F	33	Taylor Kissinger	6 ft 1 in (1.85 m)	So	Minden	Minden, NE
F	44	Kayla Mershon	6 ft 3 in (1.91 m)	Fr	Minnetonka	Chanhasen, MN

Head coach

- Amy Williams (Nebraska)

Assistant coach(es)

- Tom Goehle (Augustana (SD))
- Chuck Love (Northwestern Oklahoma State)
- Tandem Mays (Tulsa)

Legend

- (C) Team captain
- (S) Suspended
- (I) Ineligible
- (W) Walk-on
- Injured
- Current redshirt

Roster

== Schedule ==
Date time, TV	Rank^{#}	Opponent^{#}	Result	Record	Site (attendance) city, state
Exhibition
11/03/2018*; 4:00 pm		Nebraska–Kearney	W 94–41		Pinnacle Bank Arena (3,749); Lincoln, NE
Non-conference regular season
11/07/2018*; 7:00 pm		Drake	L 77–83	0–1	Pinnacle Bank Arena (3,738); Lincoln, NE
11/11/2018*; 11:00 am		USC Upstate	W 87–64	1–1	Pinnacle Bank Arena (3,638); Lincoln, NE
11/16/2018*; 9:00 pm		at Washington State	L 84–87 ^{2OT}	1–2	Beasley Coliseum (535); Pullman, WA
11/23/2018*; 2:00 pm		at No. 24 Miami (FL); Miami Thanksgiving Tournament	L 68–82	1–3	Watsco Center (730); Coral Gables, FL
11/25/2018*; 11:00 am		vs. Radford; Miami Thanksgiving Tournament	W 77–39	2–3	Watsco Center (425); Coral Gables, FL
11/29/2018*; 6:00 pm		at No. 5 Louisville; ACC–Big Ten Women's Challenge	L 68–85	2–4	KFC Yum! Center (7,334); Louisville, KY
12/02/2018*; 1:00 pm		at Creighton	L 65–74	2–5	D. J. Sokol Arena (1,533); Omaha, NE
12/05/2018*; 7:00 pm		Kansas	W 58–52	3–5	Pinnacle Bank Arena (3,688); Lincoln, NE
12/08/2018*; 12:00 pm		San Jose State	W 96–63	4–5	Pinnacle Bank Arena (3,601); Lincoln, NE
12/15/2018*; 4:30 pm		Denver	W 96–71	5–5	Pinnacle Bank Arena (3,703); Lincoln, NE
12/18/2018*; 7:00 pm		at Arkansas	L 80–84	5–6	Bud Walton Arena (1,335); Fayetteville, AR
Big Ten conference season
12/28/2018; 6:00 pm, BTN		Michigan	W 70–56	6–6 (1–0)	Pinnacle Bank Arena (4,450); Lincoln, NE
12/31/2018; 12:00 pm, BTN		at Ohio State	W 78–69	7–6 (2–0)	Value City Arena (5,530); Columbus, OH
01/03/2019; 7:00 pm		at No. 19 Iowa	L 71–77	7–7 (2–1)	Carver–Hawkeye Arena (4,391); Iowa City, IA
01/08/2019; 7:00 pm		No. 9 Maryland	L 63–81	7–8 (2–2)	Pinnacle Bank Arena (3,796); Lincoln, NE
01/13/2019; 2:00 pm, BTN		Rutgers	L 56–62	7–9 (2–3)	Pinnacle Bank Arena (4,222); Lincoln, NE
01/17/2019; 7:00 pm		at Illinois	W 77–67	8–9 (3–3)	State Farm Center (1,349); Champaign, IL
01/20/2019; 5:00 pm, ESPN2		No. 23 Minnesota	W 63–57	9–9 (4–3)	Pinnacle Bank Arena (4,072); Lincoln, NE
01/24/2019; 7:00 pm		Northwestern	L 54–58	9–10 (4–4)	Pinnacle Bank Arena (3,660); Lincoln, NE
01/27/2019; 2:00 pm		at Wisconsin	L 69–70	9–11 (4–5)	Kohl Center (6,074); Madison, WI
01/31/2019; 7:00 pm, BTN		at Purdue	W 84–64	10–11 (5–5)	Mackey Arena (5,901); West Lafayette, IN
02/03/2019; 2:00 pm		Indiana	L 78–82	10–12 (5–6)	Pinnacle Bank Arena (3,893); Lincoln, NE
02/07/2019; 6:00 pm, BTN		at Michigan	L 61–67	10–13 (5–7)	Crisler Center (2,572); Ann Arbor, MI
02/10/2019; 2:00 pm		Purdue	W 67–61	11–13 (6–7)	Pinnacle Bank Arena (4,298); Lincoln, NE
02/14/2019; 7:00 pm, BTN		at No. 7 Maryland	L 63–89	11–14 (6–8)	Xfinity Center (4,467); College Park, MD
02/17/2019; 3:00 pm, BTN		No. 24 Michigan State	W 82–71	12–14 (7–8)	Pinnacle Bank Arena (5,588); Lincoln, NE
02/21/2019; 7:00 pm		at Northwestern	W 71–64	13–14 (8–8)	Welsh-Ryan Arena (446); Evanston, IL
02/25/2019; 7:30 pm, BTN		No. 12 Iowa	L 58–74	13–15 (8–9)	Pinnacle Bank Arena (5,071); Lincoln, NE
03/02/2019; 2:00 pm, BTN		at Penn State	W 79–74	14–15 (9–9)	Bryce Jordan Center (2,542); University Park, PA
Big Ten Women's Tournament
03/07/2019; 8:00 pm, BTN	(6)	vs. (11) Purdue; Second Round	L 71–75	14–16	Bankers Life Fieldhouse (3,445); Indianapolis, IN
*Non-conference game. ^{#}Rankings from AP Poll. (#) Tournament seedings in parentheses. All times are in CST Time.

== Rankings ==
Regular season polls
Poll	Pre- Season	Week 2	Week 3	Week 4	Week 5	Week 6	Week 7	Week 8	Week 9	Week 10	Week 11	Week 12	Week 13	Week 14	Week 15	Week 16	Week 17	Week 18	Week 19	Final
AP																				N/A
Coaches																				

Legend
	Increase in ranking
	Decrease in ranking
	Not ranked previous week
(RV)	Received Votes

== See also ==
- 2018–19 Nebraska Cornhuskers men's basketball team
