= 2018–19 Michigan Wolverines women's basketball team =

Intercollegiate basketball season

2018–19 Michigan Wolverines women's basketball

NCAA tournament, second round
- Conference: Big Ten Conference
- Record: 22–12 (11–7 Big Ten)
- Head coach: Kim Barnes Arico (7th season)
- Assistant coaches: Melanie Moore; Wesley Brooks; Yvonne Sanchez
- Home arena: Crisler Center

2018–19 Big Ten women's basketball standings
| | Conf. | | | | Overall |
| Team | W | | L | PCT | W | | L | PCT |
|---|---|---|---|---|---|---|---|---|
| No. 9 Maryland | 15 | – | 3 | .833 | 29 | – | 5 | .853 |
| No. 8 Iowa † | 14 | – | 4 | .778 | 29 | – | 7 | .806 |
| Rutgers | 13 | – | 5 | .722 | 22 | – | 10 | .688 |
| Michigan | 11 | – | 7 | .611 | 22 | – | 12 | .647 |
| Ohio State | 10 | – | 8 | .556 | 14 | – | 15 | .483 |
| Minnesota | 9 | – | 9 | .500 | 21 | – | 11 | .656 |
| Michigan State | 9 | – | 9 | .500 | 21 | – | 12 | .636 |
| Northwestern | 9 | – | 9 | .500 | 21 | – | 15 | .583 |
| Nebraska | 9 | – | 9 | .500 | 14 | – | 16 | .467 |
| Indiana | 8 | – | 10 | .444 | 21 | – | 13 | .618 |
| Purdue | 8 | – | 10 | .444 | 19 | – | 15 | .559 |
| Penn State | 5 | – | 13 | .278 | 12 | – | 18 | .400 |
| Wisconsin | 4 | – | 14 | .222 | 15 | – | 18 | .455 |
| Illinois | 2 | – | 16 | .111 | 10 | – | 20 | .333 |
† 2019 Big Ten tournament winner Rankings from AP poll

The 2018–19 Michigan Wolverines women's basketball team represented the University of Michigan during the 2018–19 NCAA Division I women's basketball season. The Wolverines, led by head coach Kim Barnes Arico in her seventh year, played their home games at the Crisler Center. This season marked the program's 37th season as a member of the Big Ten Conference.

Michigan finished the season with a 22–12 record, including 11–7 in Big Ten play, to finish in fourth place in the Big Ten Conference. The team advanced to the semifinals of the Big Ten Conference women's basketball tournament for the first time since 2001, where they lost to Maryland. They received an at-large bid to the 2019 NCAA Division I women's basketball tournament, where they defeated Kansas State in the first round before losing to Louisville in the second round.

== Previous season ==
The Wolverines finished the 2017–18 season with a 23–10 record, including 10–6 in Big Ten play to finish in sixth place. They advanced to the quarterfinals of the Big Ten women's tournament where they lost to Nebraska. They received an at-large bid to the 2018 NCAA Division I women's basketball tournament where they defeated Northern Colorado in the first round, before losing to Baylor in the second round.

== Roster ==
2018–19 Michigan Wolverines women's basketball team
Players
Coaches

| Pos. | # | Name | Height | Year | Previous school | Hometown |
|---|---|---|---|---|---|---|
| F | 00 | Naz Hillmon | 6 ft 2 in (1.88 m) | Fr | Gilmour Academy | Cleveland, OH |
| G | 1 | Amy Dilk | 6 ft 0 in (1.83 m) | Fr | Carmel | Carmel, IN |
| G | 2 | Priscilla Smeenge | 6 ft 0 in (1.83 m) | Fr | Celebration | Jacksonville, FL |
| F | 5 | Kayla Robbins | 6 ft 1 in (1.85 m) | Jr | St. John's College | Mitchellville, MD |
| G | 10 | Nicole Munger | 5 ft 11 in (1.8 m) | Sr | Central Bucks West | Doylestown, PA |
| G | 12 | Ariel Young | 6 ft 1 in (1.85 m) | Fr | Lincoln | Tallahassee, FL |
| G | 14 | Akienreh Johnson | 6 ft 0 in (1.83 m) | Jr | Rogers | Toledo, OH |
| F | 15 | Hailey Brown | 6 ft 1 in (1.85 m) | So | The Rise Centre Academy | Hamilton, Ontario |
| G | 20 | Deja Church | 5 ft 10 in (1.78 m) | So | Southfield A&T | Southfield, MI |
| F | 21 | Samantha Trammel | 6 ft 1 in (1.85 m) | Sr | Eastview | Minnetonka, MN |
| G | 23 | Danielle Rauch | 5 ft 8 in (1.73 m) | Fr | Bishop Ludden | Syracuse, NY |
| C | 30 | Hallie Thome | 6 ft 5 in (1.96 m) | Sr | Chagrin Falls | Chagrin Falls, OH |
| F | 33 | Emily Kiser | 6 ft 3 in (1.91 m) | Fr | Noblesville | Noblesville, IN |

Head coach

- Kim Barnes Arico (Montclair State)

Assistant coach(es)

- Wesley Brooks (West Virginia)
- Melanie Moore (Siena)
- Yvonne Sanchez (Alliant)

Legend

- (C) Team captain
- (S) Suspended
- (I) Ineligible
- (W) Walk-on
- Injured
- Current redshirt

Roster
Last update: October 8, 2018

== Schedule ==
| Date time, TV | Rank^{#} | Opponent^{#} | Result | Record | Site (attendance) city, state |
Exhibition
| November 1, 2018*; 7:00 pm | | Findlay | W 84–38 | – | Crisler Center (400); Ann Arbor, MI |
Non-conference regular season
| November 9, 2018*; 7:00 pm | | Mount St. Mary's | W 88–40 | 1–0 | Crisler Center (2,722); Ann Arbor, MI |
| November 15, 2018*; 7:00 pm | | at Western Michigan | W 79–42 | 2–0 | University Arena (1,250); Kalamazoo, MI |
| November 19, 2018*; 7:00 pm | | Detroit Mercy | W 95–62 | 3–0 | Crisler Center (2,241); Ann Arbor, MI |
| November 23, 2018*; 7:30 pm | | vs. No. 21 Missouri; Gulf Coast Showcase Quarterfinals | W 70–54 | 4–0 | Hertz Arena (1,317); Estero, FL |
| November 24, 2018*; 7:30 pm | | vs. No. 10 Texas; Gulf Coast Showcase Semifinals | L 52–69 | 4–1 | Hertz Arena (652); Estero, FL |
| November 25, 2018*; 5:00 pm | | vs. Washington; Gulf Coast Showcase 3rd place game | W 80–73 | 5–1 | Hertz Arena; Estero, FL |
| November 29, 2018*; 7:00 pm | | at No. 13 NC State; ACC–Big Ten Women's Challenge | L 55–66 | 5–2 | Reynolds Coliseum (2,782); Raleigh, NC |
| December 2, 2018*; 5:00 pm | | at No. 22 Marquette | L 74–85 | 5–3 | Al McGuire Center (1,469); Milwaukee, WI |
| December 6, 2018*; 7:00 pm | | LIU Brooklyn | W 83–38 | 6–3 | Crisler Center (2,060); Ann Arbor, MI |
| December 9, 2018*; 1:00 pm, ESPN+ | | at Oakland | W 85–59 | 7–3 | Athletics Center O'rena (1,594); Auburn Hills, MI |
| December 15, 2018*; 11:00 am | | Morgan State | W 70–47 | 8–3 | Crisler Center (2,646); Ann Arbor, MI |
| December 21, 2018*; 2:00 pm | | Southern | W 76–35 | 9–3 | Crisler Center (1,928); Ann Arbor, MI |
Big Ten conference season
| December 28, 2018; 7:00 pm, BTN | | at Nebraska | L 56–70 | 9–4 (0–1) | Pinnacle Bank Arena (4,450); Lincoln, NE |
| December 31, 2018; 2:00 pm | | No. 12 Minnesota | W 76–60 | 10–4 (1–1) | Crisler Center (4,506); Ann Arbor, MI |
| January 5, 2019; 6:00 pm, BTN | | at Purdue | L 70–71 | 10–5 (1–2) | Mackey Arena (6,446); West Lafayette, IN |
| January 8, 2019; 7:00 pm | | Northwestern | W 79–78 ^{OT} | 11–5 (2–2) | Crisler Center (2,229); Ann Arbor, MI |
| January 12, 2019; 4:30 pm, BTN | | at No. 9 Maryland | L 69–83 | 11–6 (2–3) | Xfinity Center (6,218); College Park, MD |
| January 17, 2019; 8:00 pm, BTN | | at No. 22 Iowa | L 61–75 | 11–7 (2–4) | Carver–Hawkeye Arena (6,287); Iowa City, IA |
| January 20, 2019; 3:00 pm, BTN | | Ohio State; Rivalry | W 62–58 | 12–7 (3–4) | Crisler Center (5,422); Ann Arbor, MI |
| January 24, 2019; 6:00 pm, BTN | | at Indiana | L 60–70 | 12–8 (3–5) | Simon Skjodt Assembly Hall (3,411); Bloomington, IN |
| January 27, 2019; 2:00 pm, BTN | | No. 23 Michigan State; Rivalry | L 73–77 | 12–9 (3–6) | Crisler Center (12,707); Ann Arbor, MI |
| January 31, 2019; 6:00 pm, BTN | | No. 13 Iowa; Postponed (inclement weather) | | | Crisler Center; Ann Arbor, MI |
| February 1, 2019; 12:00 pm | | No. 13 Iowa; Rescheduled from January 31 | W 90–81 | 13–9 (4–6) | Crisler Center (2,160); Ann Arbor, MI |
| February 3, 2019; 3:00 pm | | at Wisconsin | W 76–70 | 14–9 (5–6) | Kohl Center (6,670); Madison, WI |
| February 7, 2019; 7:00 pm, BTN | | Nebraska | W 67–61 | 15–9 (6–6) | Crisler Center (2,572); Ann Arbor, MI |
| February 10, 2019; 2:00 pm | | at Penn State | W 66–62 | 16–9 (7–6) | Bryce Jordan Center (5,024); University Park, PA |
| February 14, 2019; 12:00 pm | | Indiana | W 67–58 | 17–9 (8–6) | Crisler Center (2,328); Ann Arbor, MI |
| February 17, 2019; 3:00 pm | | at Illinois | W 70–56 | 18–9 (9–6) | State Farm Center (1,609); Champaign, IL |
| February 21, 2019; 7:00 pm | | Rutgers | W 86–76 | 19–9 (10–6) | Crisler Center (2,508); Ann Arbor, MI |
| February 24, 2019; 2:00 pm, ESPN2 | | at Michigan State; Rivalry | L 64–74 | 19–10 (10–7) | Breslin Center (11,368); East Lansing, MI |
| March 3, 2019; 2:00 pm | | Wisconsin | W 59–49 | 20–10 (11–7) | Crisler Center (3,786); Ann Arbor, MI |
Big Ten Women's Tournament
| March 8, 2019; 2:30 pm, BTN | (4) | vs. (13) Wisconsin; Quarterfinals | W 73–65 ^{2OT} | 21–10 | Bankers Life Fieldhouse (4,014); Indianapolis, IN |
| March 9, 2019; 5:00 pm, BTN | (4) | vs. (1) No. 8 Maryland; Semifinals | L 72–73 | 21–11 | Bankers Life Fieldhouse (4,415); Indianapolis, IN |
NCAA Women's Tournament
| March 22, 2019*; 2:00 pm, ESPN2 | (8 A) | vs. (9 A) Kansas State; First Round | W 84–54 | 22–11 | KFC Yum! Center (6,593); Louisville, KY |
| March 24, 2019*; 12:00 pm, ESPN2 | (8 A) | at (1 A) No. 5 Louisville; Second Round | L 50–71 | 22–12 | KFC Yum! Center (7,725); Louisville, KY |
*Non-conference game. ^{#}Rankings from AP Poll. (#) Tournament seedings in parentheses. A=Albany Region. All times are in Eastern Time. Source:

== Rankings ==
Ranking movement Legend: ██ Increase in ranking. ██ Decrease in ranking. NR = Not ranked. RV = Received votes.
| Poll | Pre | Wk 2 | Wk 3 | Wk 4 | Wk 5 | Wk 6 | Wk 7 | Wk 8 | Wk 9 | Wk 10 | Wk 11 | Wk 12 | Wk 13 | Wk 14 | Wk 15 | Wk 16 | Wk 17 | Wk 18 | Wk 19 | Final |
|---|---|---|---|---|---|---|---|---|---|---|---|---|---|---|---|---|---|---|---|---|
| AP | RV | RV | RV | RV | NR | NR | NR | NR | NR | NR | NR | NR | NR | NR | NR | NR | NR | NR | NR | NR |
| Coaches | NR | NR^ | NR | NR | NR | NR | NR | NR | NR | NR | NR | NR | NR | NR | NR | NR | NR | NR | NR | NR |

^Coaches did not release a Week 2 poll.
