= 2019 Big Ten women's basketball tournament =

- Classification: Division I
- Season: 2018–19
- Teams: 14
- Site: Bankers Life Fieldhouse; Indianapolis, IN
- Champions: Iowa (3rd title)
- Winning coach: Lisa Bluder (2nd title)
- MVP: Megan Gustafson (Iowa)
- Attendance: 26,813
- Television: BTN, ESPN2

2018–19 Big Ten women's basketball standings
	Conf.				Overall
Team	W		L	PCT	W		L	PCT
No. 9 Maryland	15	–	3	.833	29	–	5	.853
No. 8 Iowa †	14	–	4	.778	29	–	7	.806
Rutgers	13	–	5	.722	22	–	10	.688
Michigan	11	–	7	.611	22	–	12	.647
Ohio State	10	–	8	.556	14	–	15	.483
Minnesota	9	–	9	.500	21	–	11	.656
Michigan State	9	–	9	.500	21	–	12	.636
Northwestern	9	–	9	.500	21	–	15	.583
Nebraska	9	–	9	.500	14	–	16	.467
Indiana	8	–	10	.444	21	–	13	.618
Purdue	8	–	10	.444	19	–	15	.559
Penn State	5	–	13	.278	12	–	18	.400
Wisconsin	4	–	14	.222	15	–	18	.455
Illinois	2	–	16	.111	10	–	20	.333
† 2019 Big Ten tournament winner Rankings from AP poll

The 2019 Big Ten women's basketball tournament was a postseason tournament that was held from March 6–10, 2019 at Bankers Life Fieldhouse in Indianapolis. Iowa won the tournament championship game over Maryland, 90–76.

== Seeds ==
All 14 Big Ten schools are participating in the tournament. Teams will be seeded by 2018–19 Big Ten Conference season record. The top 10 teams receive a first-round bye and the top 4 teams receive a double bye.

Seeding for the tournament will be determined at the close of the regular conference season:

Seed	School	Conf	Tiebreak 1	Tiebreak 2	Tiebreak 3
1	‡## – Maryland	15–3			
2	## – Iowa	14–4			
3	## – Rutgers	13–5			
4	## – Michigan	11–7			
5	# – Ohio State	10–8			
6	# – Nebraska	9–9	3–1 vs. MINN, NW, MSU		
7	# – Minnesota	9–9	3–2 vs. NEB, NW, MSU		
8	# – Northwestern	9–9	2–3 vs. NEB, MINN, MSU		
9	# – Michigan State	9–9	1–3 vs. NEB, MINN, NW		
10	# – Indiana	8–10	1–1 vs. PUR	0-1 vs. MD	1-0 vs. IA
11	Purdue	8–10	1–1 vs. IND	0-1 vs. MD	1-1 vs. IA
12	Penn State	5–13			
13	Wisconsin	4–14			
14	Illinois	2–16			
‡ – Big Ten Conference regular season champions. ## – Received a double bye in the conference tournament. # – Received a first-round bye in the conference tournament. Overall record are as of the end of the regular season.

== Schedule ==
Session	Game	Time	Matchup^{#}	Television	Attendance	Score
First Round – Wednesday, March 6
1	1	1:30 pm	#13 Wisconsin vs. #12 Penn State	BTN	3,014	65–57
1	2	4:00 pm	#14 Illinois vs. #11 Purdue	BTN	3,014	60–72
Second Round – Thursday, March 7
2	3	12:00 pm	#9 Michigan State vs. #8 Northwestern	BTN	3,173	68–52
2	4	2:30 pm	#13 Wisconsin vs. #5 Ohio State	BTN	3,173	73–63
3	5	6:30 pm	#10 Indiana vs. #7 Minnesota	BTN	3,445	66–58
3	6	9:00 pm	#11 Purdue vs. #6 Nebraska	BTN	3,445	75–71
Quarterfinals – Friday, March 8
4	7	12:00 pm	#9 Michigan State vs.#1 Maryland	BTN	4,014	55–71
4	8	2:30 pm	#13 Wisconsin vs. #4 Michigan	BTN	4,014	65–73 ^{2OT}
5	9	6:30 pm	#10 Indiana vs. #2 Iowa	BTN	4,325	61–70
5	10	9:00 pm	#11 Purdue vs. #3 Rutgers	BTN	4,325	49–64
Semifinals – Saturday, March 9
6	11	5:00 pm	#1 Maryland vs. #4 Michigan	BTN	4,415	73–72
6	12	7:30 pm	#2 Iowa vs. #3 Rutgers	BTN	4,415	72–67
Championship – Sunday, March 10
7	13	6:00 pm	#1 Maryland vs. #2 Iowa	ESPN2	4,427	76–90

*Game times in Eastern Time. #Rankings denote tournament seeding.

== Bracket ==
- All times are Eastern.

First round Wednesday, March 6 BTN
12	Penn State	57
13	Wisconsin	65
11	Purdue	72
14	Illinois	60

Second round Thursday, March 7 BTN
8	Northwestern	52
9	Michigan State	68
5	Ohio State	63
13	Wisconsin	73
7	Minnesota	58
10	Indiana	66
6	Nebraska	71
11	Purdue	75

Quarterfinals; Friday, March 8 BTN
1	Maryland	71
9	Michigan State	55
4	Michigan	73**
13	Wisconsin	65
2	Iowa	70
10	Indiana	61
3	Rutgers	64
11	Purdue	49

Semifinals; Saturday, March 9 BTN
1	Maryland	73
4	Michigan	72
2	Iowa	72
3	Rutgers	67

Championship; Sunday, March 10; ESPN2
1	Maryland	76
2	Iowa	90

* denotes overtime period

== See also ==
- 2019 Big Ten Conference men's basketball tournament
