= 2018–19 Maryland Terrapins women's basketball team =

Intercollegiate basketball season

2018–19 Maryland Terrapins women's basketball
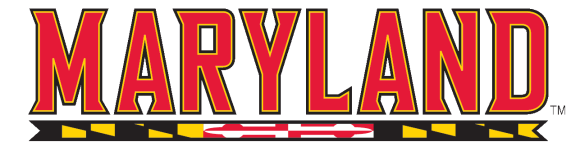

Big Ten regular season champions

NCAA tournament, second round
- Conference: Big Ten Conference

Ranking
- Coaches: No. 11
- AP: No. 9
- Record: 29–5 (15–3 Big Ten)
- Head coach: Brenda Frese (17th season)
- Assistant coaches: Shay Robinson; Karen Blair; Kaitlynn Fratz
- Home arena: Xfinity Center

2018–19 Big Ten women's basketball standings
| | Conf. | | | | Overall |
| Team | W | | L | PCT | W | | L | PCT |
|---|---|---|---|---|---|---|---|---|
| No. 9 Maryland | 15 | – | 3 | .833 | 29 | – | 5 | .853 |
| No. 8 Iowa † | 14 | – | 4 | .778 | 29 | – | 7 | .806 |
| Rutgers | 13 | – | 5 | .722 | 22 | – | 10 | .688 |
| Michigan | 11 | – | 7 | .611 | 22 | – | 12 | .647 |
| Ohio State | 10 | – | 8 | .556 | 14 | – | 15 | .483 |
| Minnesota | 9 | – | 9 | .500 | 21 | – | 11 | .656 |
| Michigan State | 9 | – | 9 | .500 | 21 | – | 12 | .636 |
| Northwestern | 9 | – | 9 | .500 | 21 | – | 15 | .583 |
| Nebraska | 9 | – | 9 | .500 | 14 | – | 16 | .467 |
| Indiana | 8 | – | 10 | .444 | 21 | – | 13 | .618 |
| Purdue | 8 | – | 10 | .444 | 19 | – | 15 | .559 |
| Penn State | 5 | – | 13 | .278 | 12 | – | 18 | .400 |
| Wisconsin | 4 | – | 14 | .222 | 15 | – | 18 | .455 |
| Illinois | 2 | – | 16 | .111 | 10 | – | 20 | .333 |
† 2019 Big Ten tournament winner Rankings from AP poll

The 2018–19 Maryland Terrapins women's basketball team represented the University of Maryland, College Park in 2018–19 NCAA Division I women's basketball season. The Terrapins, led by seventeenth-year head coach Brenda Frese, played their home games at the Xfinity Center as members of the Big Ten Conference. They finished the season 29–4, 15–3 in Big Ten play to win the Big Ten regular season championship. They advanced to the championship of the Big Ten women's tournament, where they lost to Iowa State. They received an at-large bid to the NCAA women's basketball tournament as the No. 4 seed in the Albany region. There they defeated Radford before losing to UCLA in the second round.

== Roster ==
2018–19 Maryland Terrapins women's basketball team
Players
Coaches

| Pos. | # | Name | Height | Year | Previous school | Hometown |
|---|---|---|---|---|---|---|
| F | 1 | Shakira Austin | 6 ft 5 in (1.96 m) | Fr | Riverdale Baptist | Fredericksburg, VA |
| G | 3 | Channise Lewis | 5 ft 8 in (1.73 m) | So | Miami Country Day | Miami, FL |
| G | 5 | Kaila Charles | 6 ft 1 in (1.85 m) | Jr | Riverdale Baptist | Glenn Dale, MD |
| G | 11 | Taylor Mikesell | 5 ft 11 in (1.8 m) | Fr | Jackson | Massillon, OH |
| G | 21 | Sarah Myers | 5 ft 10 in (1.78 m) | Jr | West Forsyth | Cumming, GA |
| G | 22 | Blair Watson | 6 ft 0 in (1.83 m) | Jr | Nutley | Nutley, NJ |
| F | 24 | Stephanie Jones | 6 ft 2 in (1.88 m) | Jr | Aberdeen | Havre de Grace, MD |
| G | 32 | Sara Vujacic | 5 ft 11 in (1.8 m) | Jr | Walters State CC | Maribor, Slovenia |
| F | 34 | Brianna Fraser | 6 ft 3 in (1.91 m) | Sr | South Shore | Brooklyn, NY |
| C | 35 | Olivia Owens | 6 ft 4 in (1.93 m) | Fr | Niskayuna | Niskayuna, NY |

Head coach

- Brenda Frese (Arizona)

Assistant coach(es)

- Shay Robinson (Central Florida)
- Karen Blair (SMU)
- Kaitlynn Fratz (California (PA))

Legend

- (C) Team captain
- (S) Suspended
- (I) Ineligible
- (W) Walk-on
- Injured
- Current redshirt

Roster

=== Recruits ===
College recruiting
| Name | Hometown | School | Height | Weight | Commit date |
|---|---|---|---|---|---|
| Faith Masonius; W | Spring Lake, New Jersey | Manasquan High School | 6 ft 0 in (1.83 m) | N/A | Jan 22, 2018 |
| Faith Masonius; W | Recruit ratings: ESPN: (96) | | | | |
| Diamond Miller; G | Somerset, New Jersey | Franklin High School | 6 ft 1 in (1.85 m) | N/A | Mar 10, 2018 |
| Diamond Miller; G | Recruit ratings: ESPN: (98) | | | | |
| Ashley Owusu; PG | Woodbridge, Virginia | Paul VI High School | 5 ft 9 in (1.75 m) | N/A | Aug 10, 2017 |
| Ashley Owusu; PG | Recruit ratings: ESPN: (98) | | | | |
| Zoe Young; G | Urbandale, Iowa | Valley High School | 5 ft 10 in (1.78 m) | N/A | Aug 14, 2017 |
| Zoe Young; G | Recruit ratings: ESPN: (97) | | | | |
Overall recruit ranking: ESPN: 3
Note: In many cases, Scout, Rivals, 247Sports, On3, and ESPN may conflict in their listings of height and weight.; In these cases, the average was taken. ESPN grades are on a 100-point scale.; Sources:

== Awards and honors ==
=== Preseason ===
- Kaila Charles

Coached Preseason All-Big Ten team
Media Preseason All-Big Ten team

=== Individual awards ===
- Brenda Frese

All-Big Ten Coach of the Year (coaches/media)

- Taylor Mikesell

Unanimous All-Big Ten Freshman of the Year
First Team All-Big Ten (media)
Second Team All-Big Ten (coaches)
Big Ten All-Freshman Team

- Kaila Charles

Unanimous First Team All-Big Ten (coaches/media)
Honorable Mention All-American (AP)

- Stephanie Jones

Second Team All-Big Ten (Big Ten Media)
Honorable Mention All-Big Ten

- Shakira Austin

Big Ten All-Freshman Team
Big Ten All-Defensive Team
Honorable Mention All-Big Ten (Big Ten Media)

- Sarah Myers

Big Ten Sportsmanship Award Honoree

== Schedule and results ==
| Date time, TV | Rank^{#} | Opponent^{#} | Result | Record | Site (attendance) city, state |
Exhibition
| 10/28/2018*; 12:00 pm | No. 9 | Kutztown | W 90–63 | | Xfinity Center; College Park, MD |
| 11/02/2018*; 6:00 pm | No. 9 | Clarion | W 127–41 | | Xfinity Center; College Park, MD |
Non-conference regular season
| 11/09/2018*; 7:00 pm | No. 9 | Coppin State | W 93–36 | 1–0 | Xfinity Center (4,432); College Park, MD |
| 11/11/2018*; 2:00 pm | No. 9 | Dayton | W 82–71 | 2–0 | Xfinity Center (4,631); College Park, MD |
| 11/14/2018*; 7:00 pm, ESPN+ | No. 9 | at George Washington | W 69–30 | 3–0 | Charles E. Smith Center (1,170); Washington, D.C. |
| 11/18/2018*; 5:30 pm, ESPN | No. 9 | at No. 10 South Carolina | W 85–61 | 4–0 | Colonial Life Arena (11,240); Columbia, SC |
| 11/23/2018*; 12:00 pm | No. 7 | vs. Morgan State; Puerto Rico Classic | W 68–44 | 5–0 | Coliseo Rubén Zayas Montañez (60); San Juan, PR |
| 11/24/2018*; 12:00 pm | No. 7 | vs. Georgia; Puerto Rico Classic | W 58–51 | 6–0 | Coliseo Rubén Zayas Montañez (188); San Juan, PR |
| 11/29/2018*; 6:30 pm, BTN | No. 7 | Georgia Tech; ACC–Big Ten Women's Challenge | W 67–54 | 7–0 | Xfinity Center (4,108); College Park, MD |
| 12/02/2018*; 1:00 pm | No. 7 | UMBC | W 92–61 | 8–0 | Xfinity Center (4,226); College Park, MD |
| 12/08/2018*; 12:00 pm | No. 7 | James Madison | W 87–63 | 9–0 | Xfinity Center (4,357); College Park, MD |
| 12/10/2018*; 11:00 am | No. 6 | Loyola (MD) | W 83–48 | 10–0 | Xfinity Center (9,736); College Park, MD |
| 12/20/2018*; 3:00 pm | No. 5 | at Delaware | W 77–53 | 11–0 | Bob Carpenter Center (1,423); Newark, DE |
Big Ten regular season
| 12/28/2018; 7:00 pm | No. 4 | at Penn State | W 77–61 | 12–0 (1–0) | Bryce Jordan Center (2,259); University Park, PA |
| 12/31/2018; 12:00 pm | No. 4 | Rutgers | L 65–73 | 12–1 (1–1) | Xfinity Center (5,892); College Park, MD |
| 01/05/2019; 4:00 pm, BTN | No. 4 | Ohio State | W 75–69 | 13–1 (2–1) | Xfinity Center (6,731); College Park, MD |
| 01/08/2019; 8:00 pm | No. 9 | at Nebraska | W 81–63 | 14–1 (3–1) | Pinnacle Bank Arena (3,796); Lincoln, NE |
| 01/12/2019; 4:30 pm, BTN | No. 9 | Michigan | W 83–69 | 15–1 (4–1) | Xfinity Center (6,218); College Park, MD |
| 01/17/2019; 6:00 pm, BTN | No. 9 | at No. 17 Michigan State | L 60–77 | 15–2 (4–2) | Breslin Center (5,651); East Lansing, MI |
| 01/20/2019; 2:00 pm, ESPN2 | No. 9 | Penn State | W 79–67 | 16–2 (5–2) | Xfinity Center (7,684); College Park, MD |
| 01/24/2019; 8:00 pm, BTN | No. 11 | at Ohio State | W 70–57 | 17–2 (6–2) | Value City Arena (3,962); Columbus, OH |
| 01/27/2019; 12:00 pm, BTN | No. 11 | at Indiana | W 76–56 | 18–2 (7–2) | Simon Skjodt Assembly Hall (4,555); Bloomington, IN |
| 01/31/2019; 7:00 pm | No. 11 | Wisconsin | W 75–57 | 19–2 (8–2) | Xfinity Center (4,594); College Park, MD |
| 02/04/2019; 7:30 pm, BTN | No. 10 | at Illinois | W 80–66 | 20–2 (9–2) | State Farm Center (1,088); Champaign, IL |
| 02/07/2019; 6:30 pm | No. 10 | Northwestern | W 72–57 | 21–2 (10–2) | Xfinity Center (4,933); College Park, MD |
| 02/10/2019; 2:00 pm | No. 10 | at No. 20 Rutgers | W 62–48 | 22–2 (11–2) | Louis Brown Athletic Center (4,573); Piscataway, NJ |
| 02/14/2019; 8:00 pm, BTN | No. 7 | Nebraska | W 89–63 | 23–2 (12–2) | Xfinity Center (4,467); College Park, MD |
| 02/17/2019; 1:00 pm, ESPN2 | No. 7 | at No. 14 Iowa | L 73–86 | 23–3 (12–3) | Carver–Hawkeye Arena (10,716); Iowa City, IA |
| 02/21/2019; 7:00 pm, BTN | No. 8 | Minnesota | W 71–69 | 24–3 (13–3) | Xfinity Center (5,116); College Park, MD |
| 02/25/2019; 6:30 pm, BTN | No. 8 | at Purdue | W 58–55 | 25–3 (14–3) | Mackey Arena (6,009); West Lafayette, IN |
| 03/02/2019; 2:00 pm | No. 8 | Illinois | W 71–62 | 26–3 (15–3) | Xfinity Center (8,638); College Park, MD |
Big Ten Women's Tournament
| 03/08/2019; 12:00 pm, BTN | (1) No. 8 | vs. (9) Michigan State; Quarterfinals | W 71–55 | 27–3 | Bankers Life Fieldhouse; Indianapolis, IN |
| 03/09/2019; 5:00 pm, BTN | (1) No. 8 | vs. (4) Michigan; Semifinals | W 73–72 | 28–3 | Bankers Life Fieldhouse; Indianapolis, IN |
| 03/10/2019; 6:00 pm, ESPN2 | (1) No. 8 | vs. (2) No. 10 Iowa; Championship Game | L 76–90 | 28–4 | Bankers Life Fieldhouse (4,427); Indianapolis, IN |
NCAA Women's Tournament
| 03/23/2019*; 11:00 am, ESPN2 | (4 A) No. 9 | (13 A) Radford; First Round | W 73–51 | 29–4 | Xfinity Center (5,072); College Park, MD |
| 03/25/2019*; 7:00 pm, ESPN | (4 A) No. 9 | (6 A) No. 20 UCLA; Second Round | L 80–85 | 29–5 | Xfinity Center (3,941); College Park, MD |
*Non-conference game. ^{#}Rankings from AP Poll. (#) Tournament seedings in parentheses. A=Albany Region. All times are in Eastern Time.

== Rankings ==
Regular season polls
| Poll | Pre- season | Week 2 | Week 3 | Week 4 | Week 5 | Week 6 | Week 7 | Week 8 | Week 9 | Week 10 | Week 11 | Week 12 | Week 13 | Week 14 | Week 15 | Week 16 | Week 17 | Week 18 | Week 19 | Final |
|---|---|---|---|---|---|---|---|---|---|---|---|---|---|---|---|---|---|---|---|---|
| AP | 9 | 9 | 7 | 7 | 7 | 6 | 5 | 4 | 4 | 9 | 9 | 11 | 11 | 10 | 7 | 8 | 8 | 8 | 9 | N/A |
| Coaches | 10 | 10^ | 10 | 8 | 7 | 6 | 5 | 4 | 4 | 9 | 9 | 10 | 10 | 8 | 8 | 9 | 9 | 8 | 9 | 11 |

Legend
| | Increase in ranking |
| | Decrease in ranking |
| | Not ranked previous week |
| (RV) | Received votes |
| (NR) | Not ranked |

^Coaches did not release a Week 2 poll.

== See also ==
- 2018–19 Maryland Terrapins men's basketball team
