= 2018–19 Minnesota Golden Gophers women's basketball team =

Intercollegiate basketball season

2018–19 Minnesota Golden Gophers women's basketball

WNIT, Second Round
- Conference: Big Ten Conference
- Record: 21–11 (9–9 Big Ten)
- Head coach: Lindsay Whalen (1st season)
- Assistant coaches: Danielle O'Banion; Carly Thibault-DuDonis; Kelly Roysland
- Home arena: Williams Arena

2018–19 Big Ten women's basketball standings
	Conf.				Overall
Team	W		L	PCT	W		L	PCT
No. 9 Maryland	15	–	3	.833	29	–	5	.853
No. 8 Iowa †	14	–	4	.778	29	–	7	.806
Rutgers	13	–	5	.722	22	–	10	.688
Michigan	11	–	7	.611	22	–	12	.647
Ohio State	10	–	8	.556	14	–	15	.483
Minnesota	9	–	9	.500	21	–	11	.656
Michigan State	9	–	9	.500	21	–	12	.636
Northwestern	9	–	9	.500	21	–	15	.583
Nebraska	9	–	9	.500	14	–	16	.467
Indiana	8	–	10	.444	21	–	13	.618
Purdue	8	–	10	.444	19	–	15	.559
Penn State	5	–	13	.278	12	–	18	.400
Wisconsin	4	–	14	.222	15	–	18	.455
Illinois	2	–	16	.111	10	–	20	.333
† 2019 Big Ten tournament winner Rankings from AP poll

The 2018–19 Minnesota Golden Gophers women's basketball team represented the University of Minnesota during the 2018–19 NCAA Division I women's basketball season. The Golden Gophers, led by first-year head coach Lindsay Whalen, played their home games at Williams Arena as members of the Big Ten Conference. They finished the season 21–11, 9–9 in Big Ten play to finish in a four-way tie for fifth place. They lost in the second round of the Big Ten women's tournament to Indiana. They received an at-large bid to the WNIT. There, they defeated Northern Iowa in the first round before losing to Cincinnati in the second round.

== Roster ==
2018–19 Minnesota Golden Gophers women's basketball team
Players
Coaches

Pos.	#	Name	Height	Year	Previous school	Hometown
F/C	2	Barbora Tomancova	6 ft 2 in (1.88 m)	Fr	SGLD Brno	Brno, Czech Republic
G/F	3	Destiny Pitts	5 ft 10 in (1.78 m)	So	Detroit Country Day	Detroit, MI
F	5	Taiye Bello	6 ft 2 in (1.88 m)	Jr	Southfield-Lathrup HS	Southfield, MI
F	11	Delaynie Byrne	6 ft 2 in (1.88 m)	Fr	Ralston Valley HS	Arvada, CO
G	12	Mercedes Staples	5 ft 10 in (1.78 m)	Fr	Viewmont HS	Centerville, UT
F	20	Kehinde Bello	6 ft 2 in (1.88 m)	Jr	Southfield-Lathrup HS	Southfield, MI
G	21	Jasmine Brunson	5 ft 8 in (1.73 m)	Jr	Mary Louis Academy	Queens, NY
G	23	Kenisha Bell	5 ft 9 in (1.75 m)	RS Sr	Kennedy HS; Marquettte	Minneapolis, MN
F	25	Palma Kaposi	6 ft 2 in (1.88 m)	Sr	None	Pécs, Hungary
F	31	Irene Garrido Perez	6 ft 1 in (1.85 m)	Sr	Wyoming CC	Granada, Spain
G	34	Gadiva Hubbard	5 ft 9 in (1.75 m)	Jr	Princess Anne HS	Virginia Beach, VA
C	41	Annalese Lamke	6 ft 3 in (1.91 m)	Sr	Gale-Ettrick-Trempealeau HS	Milwaukee, WI

Head coach

- Lindsay Whalen (Minnesota)

Assistant coach(es)

- Danielle O'Banion (Boston College)
- Carly Thibault-DuDonis (Monmouth)
- Kelly Roysland (Minnesota)

Legend

- (C) Team captain
- (S) Suspended
- (I) Ineligible
- (W) Walk-on
- Injured
- Current redshirt

Roster

== Schedule and results ==
Date time, TV	Rank^{#}	Opponent^{#}	Result	Record	Site (attendance) city, state
Non-conference regular season
11/09/2018*; 8:00 pm		New Hampshire	W 70–47	1–0	Williams Arena (14,625); Minneapolis, MN
11/14/2018*; 6:00 pm	No. 25	at Xavier	W 78–53	2–0	Cintas Center (831); Cincinnati, OH
11/17/2018*; 7:30 pm	No. 25	San Diego	W 53–48	3–0	Williams Arena (3,626); Minneapolis, MN
11/20/2018*; 7:00 pm	No. 23	Arkansas–Pine Bluff	W 84–42	4–0	Williams Arena (3,007); Minneapolis, MN
11/23/2018*; 3:00 pm	No. 23	Cornell	W 65–45	5–0	Williams Arena (4,339); Minneapolis, MN
11/29/2018*; 7:30 pm, BTN	No. 20	No. 12 Syracuse; ACC–Big Ten Women's Challenge	W 72–68	6–0	Williams Arena (4,178); Minneapolis, MN
12/02/2018*; 3:00 pm	No. 20	Air Force	W 67–50	7–0	Williams Arena (3,642); Minneapolis, MN
12/05/2018*; 12:00 pm	No. 14	Incarnate Word	W 75–39	8–0	Williams Arena (7,835); Minneapolis, MN
12/09/2018*; 1:00 pm	No. 14	at Boston College	W 77–69	9–0	Conte Forum (1,417); Chestnut Hill, MA
12/12/2018*; 7:00 pm	No. 13	Coppin State	W 84–52	10–0	Williams Arena (3,583); Minneapolis, MN
12/22/2018*; 3:00 pm	No. 13	Rhode Island	W 91–71	11–0	Williams Arena (5,224); Minneapolis, MN
Big Ten conference season
12/28/2018; 8:00 pm, BTN	No. 12	Wisconsin	W 74–56	12–0 (1–0)	Williams Arena (7,918); Minneapolis, MN
12/31/2018; 1:00 pm	No. 12	at Michigan	L 60–76	12–1 (1–1)	Crisler Center (4,506); Ann Arbor, MI
01/06/2019; 3:00 pm	No. 12	Illinois	L 62–66	12–2 (1–2)	Williams Arena (6,622); Minneapolis, MN
01/09/2019; 6:00 pm	No. 18	at No. 23 Michigan State	L 68–86	12–3 (1–3)	Breslin Center (5,018); East Lansing, MI
01/14/2019; 6:00 pm, ESPN2	No. 23	No. 22 Iowa	L 63–81	12–4 (1–4)	Williams Arena (5,439); Minneapolis, MN
01/17/2019; 7:00 pm	No. 23	at Wisconsin	W 78–50	13–4 (2–4)	Kohl Center (3,137); Madison, WI
01/20/2019; 5:00 pm, ESPN2	No. 23	at Nebraska	L 57–63	13–5 (2–5)	Pinnacle Bank Arena (4,072); Lincoln, NE
01/24/2019; 7:00 pm		Purdue	L 53–64	13–6 (2–6)	Williams Arena (5,572); Minneapolis, MN
01/28/2019; 6:30 pm, BTN		Ohio State	L 55–65	13–7 (2–7)	Williams Arena (3,470); Minneapolis, MN
01/31/2019; 7:00 pm		at Northwestern	W 61–54	14–7 (3–7)	Welsh–Ryan Arena (606); Evanston, IL
02/03/2019; 3:00 pm		No. 17 Rutgers	W 60–46	15–7 (4–7)	Williams Arena (4,888); Minneapolis, MN
02/06/2019; 6:00 pm		at Indiana	W 65–61	16–7 (5–7)	Simon Skjodt Assembly Hall (3,398); Bloomington, IN
02/10/2019; 1:00 pm, BTN		Northwestern	W 73–64	17–7 (6–7)	Williams Arena (5,475); Minneapolis, MN
02/14/2019; 5:00 pm, BTN		at Purdue	W 65–45	18–7 (7–7)	Mackey Arena (6,126); West Lafayette, IN
02/17/2019; 1:00 pm, BTN		Penn State	W 97–67	19–7 (8–7)	Williams Arena (5,869); Minneapolis, MN
02/21/2019; 6:00 pm		at No. 8 Maryland	L 69–71	19–8 (8–8)	Xfinity Center (5,116); College Park, MD
02/28/2019; 6:00 pm, BTN		at Rutgers	L 54–60	19–9 (8–9)	Louis Brown Athletic Center (2,852); Piscataway, NJ
03/03/2019; 3:00 pm		Michigan State	W 81–63	20–9 (9–9)	Williams Arena (7,707); Minneapolis, MN
Big Ten Women's Tournament
03/07/2019; 5:30 pm, BTN	(7)	vs. (10) Indiana; Second Round	L 58–66	20–10	Bankers Life Fieldhouse; Indianapolis, IN
WNIT
03/22/2019*; 6:30 pm		Northern Iowa; First Round	W 91–75	21–10	Williams Arena (2,549); Minneapolis, MN
03/24/2019*; 2:00 pm		at Cincinnati; Second Round	L 65–72	21–11	Fifth Third Arena (1,945); Cincinnati, OH
*Non-conference game. ^{#}Rankings from AP Poll. (#) Tournament seedings in parentheses. All times are in Central Time.

== Rankings ==
Regular season polls
Poll	Pre- season	Week 2	Week 3	Week 4	Week 5	Week 6	Week 7	Week 8	Week 9	Week 10	Week 11	Week 12	Week 13	Week 14	Week 15	Week 16	Week 17	Week 18	Week 19	Final
AP	RV	25	23	20	14	13-T	13	12	12	18	23	RV	RV	RV	RV	RV	RV			N/A
Coaches	RV	RV^	RV	RV	18	16-T	16	15	13	20	25	RV								

Legend
	Increase in ranking
	Decrease in ranking
	Not ranked previous week
(RV)	Received votes

^Coaches did not release a Week 2 poll.

== See also ==
- 2018–19 Minnesota Golden Gophers men's basketball team
