= 2018–19 Texas Tech Lady Raiders basketball team =

Intercollegiate basketball season

2018–19 Texas Tech Lady Raiders basketball
- Conference: Big 12 Conference
- Record: 14–17 (4–14 Big 12)
- Head coach: Marlene Stollings (1st season)
- Assistant coaches: Nikita Lowry Dawkins; Larry Tidwell; Erin Grant
- Home arena: United Supermarkets Arena

2018–19 Big 12 Conference women's basketball standings
	Conf.				Overall
Team	W		L	PCT	W		L	PCT
No. 1 Baylor †	18	–	0	1.000	37	–	1	.974
No. 13 Iowa State	13	–	5	.722	26	–	9	.743
No. 23 Texas	12	–	6	.667	23	–	10	.697
West Virginia	11	–	7	.611	22	–	11	.667
Kansas State	11	–	7	.611	21	–	12	.636
TCU	10	–	8	.556	24	–	11	.686
Oklahoma State	5	–	13	.278	14	–	16	.467
Oklahoma	4	–	14	.222	8	–	22	.267
Texas Tech	4	–	14	.222	14	–	17	.452
Kansas	2	–	16	.111	13	–	18	.419
† 2019 Big 12 Tournament winner Rankings from AP poll

The 2018–19 Texas Tech Lady Raiders basketball team represented Texas Tech University in the 2018–19 NCAA Division I women's basketball season. The Lady Raiders were led by first-year head coach Marlene Stollings. They played their home games at United Supermarkets Arena and were members of the Big 12 Conference. They finished the season 14–17, 4–14 in Big 12 play to finish in a tie for eighth place. They advanced to the quarterfinals of the Big 12 women's tournament, where they lost to Baylor.

== Media ==
=== Television and radio information ===
Select Lady Raiders games were shown on FSN affiliates throughout the season, including FSSW, FSSW+, and FCS Atlantic, Central, and Pacific. All games were broadcast on the Lady Raiders Radio Network on either KLZK or KJTV.

== Roster ==
2018–19 Texas Tech Lady Raiders women's basketball team
Players
Coaches

Pos.	#	Name	Height	Year	Previous school	Hometown
G	0	Mia Castaneda	5 ft 6 in (1.68 m)	Jr	Hereford; Clarendon JC	Hereford, TX
C	1	Erin Degrate	6 ft 6 in (1.98 m)	RS Jr	La Vega; Louisville	Waco, TX
G	2	Sydney Goodson	5 ft 8 in (1.73 m)	RS So	Liberty Christian; Arizona State	Argyle, TX
G	3	Eryka Sidney	5 ft 6 in (1.68 m)	Jr	Wheatley; San Jacinto College	Houston, TX
G	4	Chrislyn Carr	5 ft 5 in (1.65 m)	Fr	West	Davenport, IA
F	5	Tihana Stojsavljevic	6 ft 2 in (1.88 m)	RS So	Tresnjevka; Maine	Zagreb, Croatia
C	10	Emma Merriweather (redshirt)	6 ft 5 in (1.96 m)	So	Lakeside; Long Beach State	Buena Park, CA
G	15	Andrayah Adams (redshirt)	5 ft 10 in (1.78 m)	Jr	Como Park; St. John's	Minneapolis, MN
F	20	Brittany Brewer	6 ft 4 in (1.93 m)	Jr	Wylie	Abilene, TX
G	23	Angel Hayden	5 ft 6 in (1.68 m)	So	Canyon	Canyon, TX
C	25	Marcella Lamark dos Santos	6 ft 5 in (1.96 m)	Jr	College of Central Florida	São Paulo, Brazil
F	30	Zuri Sanders	6 ft 0 in (1.83 m)	Sr	Evansville Central	Evansville, IN
G	32	Kiara Shoals	5 ft 10 in (1.78 m)	Jr	Foreman; Frank Phillips College	Foreman, AR

Head coach

- Marlene Stollings (Ohio)

Assistant coach(es)

- Nikita Lowry Dawkins (Ohio State)
- Larry Tidwell (Austin College)
- Erin Grant (Texas Tech)

Legend

- (C) Team captain
- (S) Suspended
- (I) Ineligible
- (W) Walk-on
- Injured
- Current redshirt

Roster

== Schedule ==
Date time, TV	Rank^{#}	Opponent^{#}	Result	Record	Site (attendance) city, state
Non-conference regular season
Nov 9, 2018*; 5:30 pm		Jacksonville State	W 71–58	1–0	United Supermarkets Arena (2,811); Lubbock, TX
Nov 11, 2018*; 2:00 pm		Louisiana–Monroe	W 86–42	2–0	United Supermarkets Arena (2,437); Lubbock, TX
Nov 17, 2018*; 3:00 pm, FSSW+		Idaho	L 77–88	2–1	United Supermarkets Arena (3,109); Lubbock, TX
Nov 20, 2018*; 7:00 pm		Texas A&M–Corpus Christi	W 78–61	3–1	United Supermarkets Arena (2,349); Lubbock, TX
Nov 24, 2018*; 2:00 pm		Houston Baptist	W 82–76	4–1	United Supermarkets Arena (2,775); Lubbock, TX
Nov 28, 2018*; 7:00 pm		Stephen F. Austin	W 77–69	5–1	United Supermarkets Arena (2,616); Lubbock, TX
Dec 2, 2018*; 1:00 pm, SECN		at Florida; Big 12/SEC Women's Challenge	L 67–72	5–2	O'Connell Center (1,259); Gainesville, FL
Dec 15, 2018*; 3:00 pm		at Nevada	W 86–67	6–2	Lawlor Events Center (1,368); Reno, NV
Dec 18, 2018*; 12:00 pm		Southern	W 76–58	7–2	United Supermarkets Arena (8,613); Lubbock, TX
Dec 22, 2018*; 1:00 pm, FSSW+		Texas Southern	W 75–55	8–2	United Supermarkets Arena (3,410); Lubbock, TX
Dec 29, 2018*; 3:00 pm, FSSW		Abilene Christian	W 105–54	9–2	United Supermarkets Arena (3,790); Lubbock, TX
Big 12 regular season
Jan 2, 2019; 6:30 pm, FSOK		at Oklahoma	L 61–66	9–3 (0–1)	Lloyd Noble Center (2,578); Norman, OK
Jan 6, 2019; 12:00 pm, FSN		No. 8 Baylor	L 56–73	9–4 (0–2)	United Supermarkets Arena (4,355); Lubbock, TX
Jan 9, 2019; 7:00 pm		Kansas	W 69–66	10–4 (1–2)	United Supermarkets Arena (2,647); Lubbock, TX
Jan 12, 2019; 3:00 pm		at Oklahoma State	L 57–65	10–5 (1–3)	Gallagher-Iba Arena (2,018); Stillwater, OK
Jan 16, 2019; 3:00 pm, FSSW+		at TCU	L 70–78	10–6 (1–4)	Schollmaier Arena (2,025); Fort Worth, TX
Jan 19, 2019; 6:30 pm, FSSW		Kansas State	L 62–66	10–7 (1–5)	United Supermarkets Arena (3,980); Lubbock, TX
Jan 23, 2019; 5:00 pm, FSN		at West Virginia	L 65–68	10–8 (1–6)	WVU Coliseum (1,436); Morgantown, WV
Jan 26, 2019; 12:00 pm		No. 12 Texas	L 71–78	10–9 (1–7)	United Supermarkets Arena (4,356); Lubbock, TX
Jan 29, 2019; 6:30 pm		at No. 23 Iowa State	L 66–104	10–10 (1–8)	Hilton Coliseum (9,394); Ames, IA
Feb 2, 2019; 1:00 pm, FSSW		at No. 1 Baylor	L 37–96	10–11 (1–9)	Ferrell Center (6,432); Waco, TX
Feb 6, 2019; 7:00 pm		TCU	L 63–70	10–12 (1–10)	United Supermarkets Arena (2,832); Lubbock, TX
Feb 9, 2019; 6:30 pm, FSSW		Oklahoma State	W 90–78	11–12 (2–10)	United Supermarkets Arena (5,238); Lubbock, TX
Feb 13, 2019; 6:00 pm, FSSW+		West Virginia	L 72–75	11–13 (2–11)	United Supermarkets Arena (3,015); Lubbock, TX
Feb 17, 2019; 2:00 pm		at Kansas	W 75–71	12–13 (3–11)	Allen Fieldhouse (4,784); Lawrence, KS
Feb 23, 2019; 11:00 am, LHN		at No. 19 Texas	L 57–81	12–14 (3–12)	Frank Erwin Center (3,884); Austin, TX
Feb 26, 2019; 6:00 pm, FSSW		No. 20 Iowa State	L 62–64	12–15 (3–13)	United Supermarkets Arena (2,928); Lubbock, TX
Mar 2, 2019; 1:00 pm		at Kansas State	L 67–75	12–16 (3–14)	Bramlage Coliseum (4,030); Manhattan, KS
Mar 5, 2019; 7:00 pm		Oklahoma	W 88–82	13–16 (4–14)	United Supermarkets Arena (2,875); Lubbock, TX
Big 12 Women's Tournament
Mar 8, 2019; 6:00 pm, FCS	(9)	vs. (8) Oklahoma; First Round	W 104–84	14–16	Chesapeake Energy Arena; Oklahoma City, OK
Mar 9, 2019; 1:30 pm, FSN	(9)	vs. (1) No. 1 Baylor; Quarterfinals	L 61–100	14–17	Chesapeake Energy Arena; Oklahoma City, OK
*Non-conference game. ^{#}Rankings from AP Poll. (#) Tournament seedings in parentheses. All times are in Central Time.

== See also ==
- 2018–19 Texas Tech Red Raiders basketball team
