= 2018–19 Oklahoma State Cowgirls basketball team =

2018–19 Oklahoma State Cowgirls basketball
- Conference: Big 12 Conference
- Record: 14–16 (5–13 Big 12)
- Head coach: Jim Littell (8th season)
- Assistant coaches: Bill Annan; Ashley Davis; Jerise Freeman
- Home arena: Gallagher-Iba Arena

2018–19 Big 12 Conference women's basketball standings
	Conf.				Overall
Team	W		L	PCT	W		L	PCT
No. 1 Baylor †	18	–	0	1.000	37	–	1	.974
No. 13 Iowa State	13	–	5	.722	26	–	9	.743
No. 23 Texas	12	–	6	.667	23	–	10	.697
West Virginia	11	–	7	.611	22	–	11	.667
Kansas State	11	–	7	.611	21	–	12	.636
TCU	10	–	8	.556	24	–	11	.686
Oklahoma State	5	–	13	.278	14	–	16	.467
Oklahoma	4	–	14	.222	8	–	22	.267
Texas Tech	4	–	14	.222	14	–	17	.452
Kansas	2	–	16	.111	13	–	18	.419
† 2019 Big 12 Tournament winner Rankings from AP poll

The 2018–19 Oklahoma State Cowgirls basketball team represented Oklahoma State University in the 2018–19 NCAA Division I women's basketball season. The Cowgirls, led by eighth-year head coach Jim Littell, played their home games at Gallagher-Iba Arena and were members of the Big 12 Conference. They finished the season 14–16, 5–13 in Big 12 play to finish in seventh place. They lost in the first round of the Big 12 women's tournament to Kansas.

== Roster ==
2018–19 Oklahoma State Cowgirls women's basketball team
Players
Coaches

Pos.	#	Name	Height	Year	Previous school	Hometown
C	1	Kassidy De Lapp	6 ft 3 in (1.91 m)	Fr	Oak Ridge	El Dorado Hills, CA
F	10	Bryn Gerlich	6 ft 0 in (1.83 m)	Fr	Colleyville Heritage	Colleyville, TX
F	12	Vivian Gray	6 ft 1 in (1.85 m)	So	Argyle; Fort Lewis	Argyle, TX
G	14	Braxtin Miller	5 ft 10 in (1.78 m)	So	Alter High School	Centerville, OH
C	15	Mariam Gnanou	6 ft 5 in (1.96 m)	Jr	Lycée Moderne De Koumassi; Northeastern Oklahoma A&M	Abidjan, Ivory Coast
F	20	LaTashia Jones	6 ft 2 in (1.88 m)	Sr	Leavenworth	Leavenworth, KS
G	21	Ja'Mee Asberry	5 ft 5 in (1.65 m)	RS Fr	East Central	Tulsa, OK
G	23	Jaden Hobbs	5 ft 8 in (1.73 m)	RS So	Alva	Alva, OK
G	24	Karli Wheeler	5 ft 8 in (1.73 m)	Sr	Plainview	Plainview, TX
F	25	Abbie Winchester	6 ft 1 in (1.85 m)	So	Heritage Hall	Oklahoma City, OK
G	30	Maria Castro	6 ft 0 in (1.83 m)	Sr	Tecnologico De Monterrey; Gulf Coast State	Guanajuato, Mexico
G	33	Clitan de Sousa	6 ft 0 in (1.83 m)	RS Jr	Apolotecnica; Seward County CC	Maputo, Mozambique
G	34	Olivia Gray	5 ft 8 in (1.73 m)	So	Argyle; Fort Lewis	Argyle, TX

Head coach

- Jim Littell (Southwestern (KS))

Assistant coach(es)

- Bill Annan (Kansas State)
- Ashley Davis (TCU)
- Jerise Freeman (Pacific)

Legend

- (C) Team captain
- (S) Suspended
- (I) Ineligible
- (W) Walk-on
- Injured
- Current redshirt

Roster

== Schedule and results ==
Date time, TV	Rank^{#}	Opponent^{#}	Result	Record	Site (attendance) city, state
Exhibition
Oct 28, 2018*; 2:00 pm		Northeastern State	W 70–37		Gallagher-Iba Arena (1,000); Stillwater, OK
Non-conference regular season
Nov 9, 2018*; 11:00 am		Arkansas State	W 62–60	1–0	Gallagher-Iba Arena (2,576); Stillwater, OK
Nov 11, 2018*; 2:00 pm		UC Riverside	W 76–51	2–0	Gallagher-Iba Arena (1,597); Stillwater, OK
Nov 15, 2018*; 7:00 pm		Prairie View A&M	W 70–50	3–0	Gallagher-Iba Arena (1,572); Stillwater, OK
Nov 21, 2018*; 12:00 pm		Samford	W 82–62	4–0	Gallagher-Iba Arena (1,610); Stillwater, OK
Nov 27, 2018*; 6:30 pm		at Wichita State	W 60–47	5–0	Charles Koch Arena (1,818); Wichita, KS
Nov 30, 2018*; 7:00 pm		Texas State	W 66–55	6–0	Gallagher-Iba Arena (1,657); Stillwater, OK
Dec 2, 2018*; 3:00 pm, FS1		No. 11 Tennessee; Big 12/SEC Women's Challenge	L 63–76	6–1	Gallagher-Iba Arena (3,493); Stillwater, OK
Dec 8, 2018*; 7:00 pm		Houston Baptist	W 77–44	7–1	Gallagher-Iba Arena (1,659); Stillwater, OK
Dec 16, 2018*; 4:00 pm		at UCLA	L 59–71	7–2	Pauley Pavilion (2,501); Los Angeles, CA
Dec 21, 2018*; 7:00 pm		Oral Roberts	W 89–69	8–2	Gallagher-Iba Arena (2,089); Stillwater, OK
Dec 30, 2018*; 1:00 pm		Grambling State	W 86–40	9–2	Gallagher-Iba Arena (1,651); Stillwater, OK
Big 12 regular season
Jan 2, 2019; 7:00 pm, LHN		at No. 13 Texas	L 51–60	9–3 (0–1)	Frank Erwin Center (3,088); Austin, TX
Jan 6, 2019; 1:00 pm, ESPNU		TCU	W 75–71	10–3 (1–1)	Gallagher-Iba Arena (2,056); Stillwater, OK
Jan 9, 2019; 6:00 pm		at West Virginia	L 58–67	10–4 (1–2)	WVU Coliseum (1,119); Morgantown, WV
Jan 12, 2019; 3:00 pm, FSOK		Texas Tech	W 65–57	11–4 (2–2)	Gallagher-Iba Arena (2,018); Stillwater, OK
Jan 19, 2019; 12:00 pm, ESPN+		at Kansas	W 72–62	12–4 (3–2)	Allen Fieldhouse (1,792); Lawrence, KS
Jan 23, 2019; 7:00 pm, ESPN3		at Kansas State	L 48–59	12–5 (3–3)	Bramlage Coliseum (2,821); Manhattan, KS
Jan 26, 2019; 5:00 pm		No. 20 Iowa State	L 71–84	12–6 (3–4)	Gallagher-Iba Arena (1,897); Stillwater, OK
Jan 30, 2019; 7:00 pm, FSSW+		No. 1 Baylor	L 58–66	12–7 (3–5)	Gallagher-Iba Arena (1,958); Stillwater, OK
Feb 3, 2019; 2:00 pm, FSN		at TCU	L 55–69	12–8 (3–6)	Schollmaier Arena (2,170); Fort Worth, TX
Feb 6, 2019; 8:00 pm, FSN		Oklahoma; Bedlam Series	W 84–74	13–8 (4–6)	Gallagher-Iba Arena (2,009); Stillwater, OK
Feb 9, 2019; 6:30 pm, FSSW		at Texas Tech	L 78–90	13–9 (4–7)	United Supermarkets Arena (5,238); Lubbock, TX
Feb 12, 2019; 7:00 pm, FSSW+		Texas	L 55–61	13–10 (4–8)	Gallagher-Iba Arena (1,997); Stillwater, OK
Feb 16, 2019; 7:00 pm		at Iowa State	L 67–89	13–11 (4–9)	Hilton Coliseum (10,386); Ames, IA
Feb 20, 2019; 6:00 pm, FSOK		West Virginia	L 54–77	13–12 (4–10)	Gallagher-Iba Arena (1,683); Stillwater, OK
Feb 23, 2019; 1:00 pm, FSOK		Kansas	W 72–52	14–12 (5–10)	Gallagher-Iba Arena (2,155); Stillwater, OK
Feb 25, 2019; 8:00 pm, FS1		at Oklahoma; Bedlam Series	L 66–75	14–13 (5–11)	Lloyd Noble Center (4,060); Norman, OK
Mar 2, 2019; 1:00 pm, FSSW		at No. 1 Baylor	L 44–76	14–14 (5–12)	Ferrell Center (5,955); Waco, TX
Mar 4, 2019; 7:00 pm, FSOK		Kansas State	L 58–68	14–15 (5–13)	Gallagher-Iba Arena (1,701); Stillwater, OK
Big 12 Women's Tournament
Mar 8, 2019; 8:30 pm, FCS	(7)	vs. (10) Kansas; First Round	W 76–66	14–16	Chesapeake Energy Arena (3,204); Oklahoma City, OK
*Non-conference game. ^{#}Rankings from AP Poll. (#) Tournament seedings in parentheses. All times are in Central Time.

== Rankings ==
Regular season polls
Poll	Pre- season	Week 2	Week 3	Week 4	Week 5	Week 6	Week 7	Week 8	Week 9	Week 10	Week 11	Week 12	Week 13	Week 14	Week 15	Week 16	Week 17	Week 18	Week 19	Final
AP																				N/A
Coaches			RV	RV																

Legend
	Increase in ranking
	Decrease in ranking
	Not ranked previous week
(RV)	Received votes
(NR)	Not ranked and did not receive votes

== See also ==
- 2018–19 Oklahoma State Cowboys basketball team
