= 2018–19 Kansas State Wildcats women's basketball team =

Intercollegiate basketball season

2018–19 Kansas State Wildcats women's basketball

NCAA tournament, first round
- Conference: Big 12 Conference
- Record: 21–12 (11–7 Big 12)
- Head coach: Jeff Mittie (5th season)
- Assistant coaches: Brian Ostermann; Chris Carr; Jayci Stone
- Home arena: Bramlage Coliseum

2018–19 Big 12 Conference women's basketball standings
	Conf.				Overall
Team	W		L	PCT	W		L	PCT
No. 1 Baylor †	18	–	0	1.000	37	–	1	.974
No. 13 Iowa State	13	–	5	.722	26	–	9	.743
No. 23 Texas	12	–	6	.667	23	–	10	.697
West Virginia	11	–	7	.611	22	–	11	.667
Kansas State	11	–	7	.611	21	–	12	.636
TCU	10	–	8	.556	24	–	11	.686
Oklahoma State	5	–	13	.278	14	–	16	.467
Oklahoma	4	–	14	.222	8	–	22	.267
Texas Tech	4	–	14	.222	14	–	17	.452
Kansas	2	–	16	.111	13	–	18	.419
† 2019 Big 12 Tournament winner Rankings from AP poll

The 2018–19 Kansas State Wildcats women's basketball team represented Kansas State University in the 2018–19 NCAA Division I women's basketball season. The Wildcats were led by fifth-year head coach Jeff Mittie. They played their home games at Bramlage Coliseum in Manhattan, Kansas, and were members of the Big 12 Conference. They finished the season 21–12, 11–7 in Big 12 play to finish in a tie for fourth place. They advanced to the semifinals of the Big 12 women's basketball tournament, where they lost to Baylor. They received an at-large bid to the NCAA women's basketball tournament as a 9th seed in the Albany Regional, where they lost to Michigan in the first round.

== Roster ==
2018–19 Kansas State Wildcats women's basketball team
Players
Coaches

Pos.	#	Name	Height	Year	Previous school	Hometown
G	1	Savannah Simmons	6 ft 1 in (1.85 m)	Fr	The John Carroll School	Bel Air, MD
G	2	Cymone Goodrich	5 ft 10 in (1.78 m)	So	South Shore International Prep	Chicago, IL
G	3	Sarah Bates (redshirt)	5 ft 9 in (1.75 m)	So	Clovis West; UC Santa Barbara	Fresno, CA
G	5	Alisa Wiggins	5 ft 8 in (1.73 m)	So	Montclair	Montclair, NJ
G	10	Kayla Goth	6 ft 1 in (1.85 m)	Sr	DeForest	DeForest, WI
F	11	Peyton Williams	6 ft 3 in (1.91 m)	Jr	Cair Paravel	Topeka, KS
G	12	Rachel Ranke	6 ft 1 in (1.85 m)	So	Eastview	Burnsville, MN
F	13	Laura Macke	6 ft 2 in (1.88 m)	Fr	Nemaha Central	Baileyville, KS
F	15	Kali Jones	6 ft 2 in (1.88 m)	Sr	Murrietta; Mt. San Antonio	Murrieta, CA
F	25	Jasauen Beard	5 ft 10 in (1.78 m)	RS Jr	Murrietta; Texas–Rio Grande Valley	Midwest City, OK
C	33	Ashley Ray	6 ft 4 in (1.93 m)	So	Girard	Girard, KS
C	40	Mary Lakes	6 ft 4 in (1.93 m)	So	Manual	Peoria, IL
G	43	Christianna Carr	6 ft 1 in (1.85 m)	Fr	Manhattan	Manhattan, KS
C	50	Ayoka Lee (redshirt)	6 ft 5 in (1.96 m)	Fr	Byron	Byron, MN

Head coach

- Jeff Mittie (Missouri Western)

Assistant coach(es)

- Brian Ostermann (UW–La Crosse)
- Chris Carr (Southern Illinois)
- Jayci Stone (Kansas State)

Legend

- (C) Team captain
- (S) Suspended
- (I) Ineligible
- (W) Walk-on
- Injured
- Current redshirt

Roster

== Schedule and results ==
Date time, TV	Rank^{#}	Opponent^{#}	Result	Record	Site (attendance) city, state
Exhibition
Nov 1, 2018*; 7:00 pm, ESPN3		Fort Hays State	W 48–46		Bramlage Coliseum (2,927); Manhattan, KS
Nov 5, 2018*; 7:00 pm, FCSC		Pittsburg State	W 65–50		Bramlage Coliseum (2,753); Manhattan, KS
Non-conference regular season
Nov 12, 2018*; 5:30 pm		Omaha	W 61–46	1–0	Bramlage Coliseum (3,498); Manhattan, KS
Nov 16, 2018*; 7:00 pm, ESPN3		North Texas	W 60–42	2–0	Bramlage Coliseum (2,861); Manhattan, KS
Nov 18, 2018*; 1:00 pm, ESPN3		UMKC	W 61–50	3–0	Bramlage Coliseum (2,739); Manhattan, KS
Nov 22, 2018*; 12:30 pm		vs. No. 14 Syracuse; Cancún Challenge Riviera Division	L 61–70	3–1	Hard Rock Hotel Riviera Maya; Cancún, Mexico
Nov 23, 2018*; 10:00 am		vs. No. 16 DePaul; Cancún Challenge Riviera Division	L 59–79	3–2	Hard Rock Hotel Riviera Maya (300); Cancún, Mexico
Nov 24, 2018*; 10:00 am		vs. Princeton; Cancún Challenge Riviera Division	W 80–61	4–2	Hard Rock Hotel Riviera Maya (300); Cancún, Mexico
Dec 2, 2018*; 1:00 pm, ESPN3		Vanderbilt; Big 12/SEC Women's Challenge	W 72–61	5–2	Bramlage Coliseum (3,130); Manhattan, KS
Dec 5, 2018*; 7:00 pm, FCSC		Lamar	W 73–55	6–2	Bramlage Coliseum (2,683); Manhattan, KS
Dec 8, 2018*; 3:00 pm		at Little Rock	W 53–47	7–2	Jack Stephens Center; Little Rock, AR
Dec 16, 2018*; 4:00 pm		vs. No. 17 Arizona State	L 51–65	7–3	Mitchell Hall Gymnasium (1,294); La Crosse, WI
Dec 20, 2018*; 7:00 pm, ESPN3		Central Arkansas	W 70–54	8–3	Bramlage Coliseum (2,858); Manhattan, KS
Dec 29, 2018*; 1:00 pm, ESPN3		Northern Iowa	W 72–62	9–3	Bramlage Coliseum (3,340); Manhattan, KS
Big 12 regular season
Jan 2, 2019; 6:30 pm		at No. 25 Iowa State	L 58–96	9–4 (0–1)	Hilton Coliseum (9,582); Ames, IA
Jan 5, 2019; 7:00 pm, FCSC		Oklahoma	W 86–56	10–4 (1–1)	Bramlage Coliseum (6,181); Manhattan, KS
Jan 9, 2019; 7:00 pm, FSGO		at No. 4 Baylor	L 50–65	10–5 (1–2)	Ferrell Center (5,025); Waco, TX
Jan 13, 2019; 12:00 pm, FSN		Kansas; Sunflower Showdown	L 54–61	10–6 (1–3)	Bramlage Coliseum (5,334); Manhattan, KS
Jan 16, 2019; 7:00 pm, ESPN3		No. 11 Texas	W 87–69	11–6 (2–3)	Bramlage Coliseum (2,811); Manhattan, KS
Jan 19, 2019; 3:00 pm, FSSW		at Texas Tech	W 66–62	12–6 (3–3)	United Supermarkets Arena (3,980); Lubbock, TX
Jan 23, 2019; 3:00 pm, ESPN3		Oklahoma State	W 59–48	13–6 (4–3)	Bramlage Coliseum (2,821); Manhattan, KS
Jan 26, 2019; 3:00 pm		at West Virginia	L 30–60	13–7 (4–4)	WVU Coliseum (3,229); Morgantown, WV
Jan 30, 2019; 7:00 pm, FCSC		TCU	L 47–61	13–8 (4–5)	Bramlage Coliseum (2,676); Manhattan, KS
Feb 2, 2019; 1:00 pm, ESPN3		No. 23 Iowa State	L 52–81	13–9 (4–6)	Bramlage Coliseum (3,668); Manhattan, KS
Feb 6, 2019; 7:00 pm		at Kansas; Sunflower Showdown	W 72–62 ^{OT}	14–9 (5–6)	Allen Fieldhouse (2,281); Lawrence, KS
Feb 10, 2019; 2:00 pm, FSOK		at Oklahoma	W 83–75	15–9 (6–6)	Lloyd Noble Center (3,005); Norman, OK
Feb 13, 2019; 7:00 pm, ESPN3		Baylor	L 48–71	15–10 (6–7)	Bramlage Coliseum (3,481); Manhattan, KS
Feb 17, 2019; 4:00 pm, FSN		at No. 15 Texas	W 69–60	16–10 (7–7)	Frank Erwin Center (4,061); Austin, TX
Feb 23, 2019; 5:00 pm, FSSW+		at TCU	W 75–72	17–10 (8–7)	Schollmaier Arena (2,606); Fort Worth, TX
Feb 27, 2019; 7:00 pm, FCSC		West Virginia	W 90–79	18–10 (9–7)	Bramlage Coliseum (2,814); Manhattan, KS
Mar 2, 2019; 1:00 pm, ESPN3		Texas Tech	W 75–67	19–10 (10–7)	Bramlage Coliseum (4,030); Manhattan, KS
Mar 4, 2019; 7:00 pm		at Oklahoma State	W 68–58	20–10 (11–7)	Gallagher-Iba Arena (1,701); Stillwater, OK
Big 12 Women's Tournament
Mar 9, 2019; 11:00 am, FSN	(4)	vs. (5) West Virginia; Quarterfinals	W 72–59	21–10	Chesapeake Energy Arena (3,353); Oklahoma City, OK
Mar 10, 2019; 2:00 pm, FS1	(4)	vs. (1) No. 1 Baylor; Semifinals	L 60–88	21–11	Chesapeake Energy Arena; Oklahoma City, OK
NCAA Tournament
Mar 22, 2019*; 1:30 pm, ESPN2	(9 A)	vs. (8 A) Michigan; First Round	L 54–84	21–12	KFC Yum! Center (6,593); Louisville, KY
*Non-conference game. ^{#}Rankings from AP Poll / Coaches' Poll. (#) Tournament seedings in parentheses. A=Albany Region. All times are in Central Time.

== Rankings ==
Regular season polls
Poll	Pre- season	Week 2	Week 3	Week 4	Week 5	Week 6	Week 7	Week 8	Week 9	Week 10	Week 11	Week 12	Week 13	Week 14	Week 15	Week 16	Week 17	Week 18	Week 19	Final
AP																RV	RV	RV	RV	N/A
Coaches																				

Legend
	Increase in ranking
	Decrease in ranking
	No change
(RV)	Received votes
(NR)	Not ranked

== See also ==
- 2018–19 Kansas State Wildcats men's basketball team
