= 2018–19 Oklahoma Sooners women's basketball team =

Intercollegiate basketball season

2018–19 Oklahoma Sooners women's basketball
- Conference: Big 12
- Record: 8–22 (4–14 Big 12)
- Head coach: Sherri Coale (23rd season)
- Assistant coaches: Pam DeCosta; Chad Thrailkill; Colton Coale
- Home arena: Lloyd Noble Center

2018–19 Big 12 Conference women's basketball standings
	Conf.				Overall
Team	W		L	PCT	W		L	PCT
No. 1 Baylor †	18	–	0	1.000	37	–	1	.974
No. 13 Iowa State	13	–	5	.722	26	–	9	.743
No. 23 Texas	12	–	6	.667	23	–	10	.697
West Virginia	11	–	7	.611	22	–	11	.667
Kansas State	11	–	7	.611	21	–	12	.636
TCU	10	–	8	.556	24	–	11	.686
Oklahoma State	5	–	13	.278	14	–	16	.467
Oklahoma	4	–	14	.222	8	–	22	.267
Texas Tech	4	–	14	.222	14	–	17	.452
Kansas	2	–	16	.111	13	–	18	.419
† 2019 Big 12 Tournament winner Rankings from AP poll

The 2018–19 Oklahoma Sooners women's basketball team represented the University of Oklahoma in the 2018–19 NCAA Division I women's basketball season. The Sooners were led by Sherri Coale in her twenty-third season. The team played its home games at the Lloyd Noble Center in Norman, Oklahoma as a member of the Big 12 Conference. They finished the season 8–22, 4–14 in Big 12 play to finish in a tie for eighth place. They lost in the first round of the Big 12 women's tournament to Texas Tech. They missed the postseason tournament for the first time since 1998 and their first losing season in 21 years.

== Roster ==
2018–19 Oklahoma Sooners women's basketball team
Players
Coaches

Pos.	#	Name	Height	Year	Previous school	Hometown
G	0	Jessi Murcer	5 ft 7 in (1.7 m)	Fr	Westmoore	Moore, OK
F	3	Mandy Simpson	6 ft 0 in (1.83 m)	So	Boise	Boise, ID
F	4	Clary Donica	6 ft 0 in (1.83 m)	Fr	Dickson	Ardmore, OK
G	12	Gileysa Penzo	5 ft 9 in (1.75 m)	RS Sr	Montverde Academy	Guaynabo, Puerto Rico
G	14	Shaina Pellington	5 ft 7 in (1.7 m)	So	Dunbarton	Pickering, ON
F	21	Nydia Lampkin	6 ft 3 in (1.91 m)	Fr	Heritage	Palm Bay, FL
G	22	Ana Llanusa	6 ft 0 in (1.83 m)	So	Choctaw	Choctaw, OK
F	24	Ijeoma Odimgbe	6 ft 4 in (1.93 m)	Sr	Johnson	Savannah, GA
G/F	25	Madi Williams	6 ft 0 in (1.83 m)	Fr	Trinity Valley School	Fort Worth, TX
G	30	Taylor Robertson	5 ft 7 in (1.7 m)	Fr	McPherson	McPherson, KS
C	31	Aspen Williston	6 ft 4 in (1.93 m)	Fr	Broken Arrow	Broken Arrow, OK
G	32	Tatum Veitenheimer	5 ft 8 in (1.73 m)	Fr	Windthorst	Windthorst, TX

Head coach

- Sherri Coale (Oklahoma Christian)

Assistant coach(es)

- Pam DeCosta (Metro State)
- Chad Thrailkill (Southern Nazarene)
- Colton Coale (Oklahoma)

Legend

- (C) Team captain
- (S) Suspended
- (I) Ineligible
- (W) Walk-on
- Injured
- Current redshirt

Roster

== Schedule ==
Date time, TV	Rank^{#}	Opponent^{#}	Result	Record	High points	High rebounds	High assists	Site (attendance) city, state
Exhibition
Nov 5, 2018*; 7:00 pm		Northeastern State	W 119–45		33 – Pellington	9 – Veitenheimer	6 – Pellington	Lloyd Noble Center (2,442); Norman, OK
Non-conference regular season
Nov 9, 2018*; 7:00 pm, FSSW		Western Kentucky	W 90–83	1–0	33 – Pellington	15 – Williams	4 – 2 tied	Lloyd Noble Center (2,907); Norman, OK
Nov 15, 2018*; 7:00 pm, FSOK		Northwestern State	W 93–56	2–0	24 – Pellington	15 – Williams	5 – Robertson	Lloyd Noble Center (2,314); Norman, OK
Nov 18, 2018*; 1:00 pm		at No. 21 South Florida	L 70–87	2–1	18 – 2 tied	10 – Simpson	6 – Simpson	Yuengling Center (2,804); Tampa, FL
Nov 22, 2018*; 4:15 pm		vs. UAB; Junkanoo Jam Junkanoo Division semifinals	L 84–89	2–2	22 – Williams	8 – 2 tied	3 – 2 tied	Gateway Christian Academy; Bimini, Bahamas
Nov 23, 2018*; 6:45 pm		vs. Clemson; Junkanoo Jam Junkanoo Division 3rd place game	L 62–74	2–3	11 – Pellington	11 – Williams	4 – Pellington	Gateway Christian Academy; Bimini, Bahamas
Nov 28, 2018*; 8:00 pm		at New Mexico	L 80–84	2–4	23 – Robertson	8 – Simpson	5 – Pellington	Dreamstyle Arena (5,152); Albuquerque, NM
Dec 2, 2018*; 3:00 pm, SECN		at Auburn; Big 12/SEC Women's Challenge	L 79–95	2–5	27 – Robertson	16 – Williams	4 – 2 tied	Auburn Arena (1,877); Auburn, AL
Dec 5, 2018*; 7:00 pm, FSOK+		Central Arkansas	W 65–52	3–5	18 – Pellington	8 – Simpson	3 – Veitenheimer	Lloyd Noble Center (2,381); Norman, OK
Dec 9, 2018*; 2:00 pm, FSSW		No. 20 DePaul	L 76–87	3–6	19 – 2 tied	8 – Pellington	9 – Pellington	Lloyd Noble Center (2,682); Norman, OK
Dec 19, 2018*; 7:30 pm, FS1		No. 1 Connecticut	L 63–72	3–7	23 – Robertson	11 – Williams	3 – Veitenheimer	Lloyd Noble Center (5,808); Norman, OK
Dec 22, 2018*; 2:00 pm		at SMU	W 77–61	4–7	21 – Pellington	10 – Williams	7 – Veitenheimer	Moody Coliseum (1,191); Dallas, TX
Big 12 Regular Season
Jan 2, 2019; 6:30 pm, FSOK		Texas Tech	W 66–61	5–7 (1–0)	18 – Pellington	11 – Williams	6 – Simpson	Lloyd Noble Center (2,578); Norman, OK
Jan 5, 2019; 7:00 pm, FCS		at Kansas State	L 56–86	5–8 (1–1)	14 – Llanusa	5 – 3 tied	4 – Pellington	Bramlage Coliseum (6,181); Manhattan, KS
Jan 9, 2019; 7:00 pm, LHN		at No. 11 Texas	L 63–73	5–9 (1–2)	18 – Williams	6 – 3 tied	5 – Sampson	Frank Erwin Center (3,494); Austin, TX
Jan 13, 2019; 2:00 pm, FSSW		West Virginia	L 55–66	5–10 (1–3)	13 – Robertson	8 – Veitenheimer	5 – 2 tied	Lloyd Noble Center (3,171); Norman, OK
Jan 19, 2019; 12:00 pm		at No. 18 Iowa State	L 78–104	5–11 (1–4)	35 – Llanusa	10 – Odimgbe	5 – Veitenheimer	Hilton Coliseum (9,758); Ames, IA
Jan 22, 2019; 8:00 pm		at TCU	L 71–86	5–12 (1–5)	24 – Pellington	8 – Williams	3 – Murcer	Schollmaier Arena (1,929); Fort Worth, TX
Jan 27, 2019; 2:00 pm, FSN		No. 2 Baylor	L 53–74	5–13 (1–6)	21 – Roberton	8 – Williams	2 – 2 tied	Lloyd Noble Center (3,478); Norman, OK
Jan 30, 2019; 7:00 pm		at Kansas	L 79–88	5–14 (1–7)	25 – Pellington	8 – Simpson	4 – 2 tied	Allen Fieldhouse (2,269); Lawrence, KS
Feb 2, 2019; 2:00 pm, FSSW		No. 12 Texas	L 67–76	5–15 (1–8)	17 – Llanusa	7 – 2 tied	3 – Williams	Lloyd Noble Center (4,026); Norman, OK
Feb 6, 2019; 8:00 pm, FSN		at Oklahoma State; Bedlam Series	L 74–84	5–16 (1–9)	16 – Llanusa	11 – Simpson	6 – Simpson	Gallagher-Iba Arena (2,009); Stillwater, OK
Feb 10, 2019; 7:00 pm, FSOK		Kansas State	L 75–83	5–17 (1–10)	33 – Llanusa	8 – Odimgbe	5 – Penzo	Lloyd Noble Center (3,005); Norman, OK
Feb 13, 2019; 7:00 pm, FSOK		Kansas	W 78–67	6–17 (2–10)	21 – Llanusa	11 – Williams	4 – Simpson	Lloyd Noble Center (2,643); Norman, OK
Feb 16, 2019; 7:00 pm, FSSW+		at Baylor	L 53–87	6–18 (2–11)	31 – Llanusa	6 – Odimgbe	2 – 2 tied	Ferrell Center (6,168); Waco, TX
Feb 20, 2019; 10:30 am, FSSW		No. 20 Iowa State	L 70–91	6–19 (2–12)	20 – Llanusa	12 – Williams	3 – 2 tied	Lloyd Noble Center; Norman, OK
Feb 23, 2019; 3:00 pm		at West Virginia	W 80–69	7–19 (3–12)	26 – Llanusa	10 – Lampkin	5 – Murcer	WVU Coliseum (4,823); Morgantown, WV
Feb 25, 2019; 8:00 pm, FS1		Oklahoma State; Bedlam Series	W 75–66	8–19 (4–12)	26 – Llanusa	14 – Llanusa	7 – Murcer	Lloyd Noble Center (4,060); Norman, OK
Mar 2, 2019; 4:30 pm, FSSW		TCU	L 63–76	8–20 (4–13)	21 – Robinson	6 – 2 tied	4 – Murcer	Lloyd Noble Center (3,447); Norman, OK
Mar 5, 2019; 7:00 pm		at Texas Tech	L 82–88	8–21 (4–14)	27 – Llanusa	16 – Simpson	11 – Murcer	United Supermarkets Arena (2,875); Lubbock, TX
Big 12 Women's Tournament
Mar 8, 2019; 6:00 pm, FCS	(8)	vs. (9) Texas Tech; First Round	L 84–104	9–21	20 – Llanusa	5 – Williams	5 – 2 tied	Chesapeake Energy Arena; Oklahoma City, OK
*Non-conference game. ^{#}Rankings from AP Poll. (#) Tournament seedings in parentheses. All times are in Central Time.

x- Sooner Sports Television (SSTV) is aired locally on Fox Sports. However the contract allows games to air on various affiliates. Those affiliates are FSSW, FSSW+, FSOK, FSOK+, and FCS Atlantic, Central, and Pacific.

== Rankings ==
2018–19 NCAA Division I women's basketball rankings

Regular season polls
Poll	Pre- Season	Week 2	Week 3	Week 4	Week 5	Week 6	Week 7	Week 8	Week 9	Week 10	Week 11	Week 12	Week 13	Week 14	Week 15	Week 16	Week 17	Week 18	Week 19	Final
AP																				N/A
Coaches																				

Legend
	Increase in ranking
	Decrease in ranking
	No change
(RV)	Received votes
(NR)	Not ranked

== See also ==
- 2018–19 Oklahoma Sooners men's basketball team
