= 2018–19 Kansas Jayhawks women's basketball team =

Intercollegiate basketball season

2018–19 Kansas Jayhawks women's basketball

Duel in the Desert Desert Division Champions
- Conference: Big 12 Conference
- Record: 13–18 (2–16 Big 12)
- Head coach: Brandon Schneider (4th season)
- Assistant coaches: Aqua Franklin; Damitria Buchanan; Jory Collins
- Home arena: Allen Fieldhouse

2018–19 Big 12 Conference women's basketball standings
	Conf.				Overall
Team	W		L	PCT	W		L	PCT
No. 1 Baylor †	18	–	0	1.000	37	–	1	.974
No. 13 Iowa State	13	–	5	.722	26	–	9	.743
No. 23 Texas	12	–	6	.667	23	–	10	.697
West Virginia	11	–	7	.611	22	–	11	.667
Kansas State	11	–	7	.611	21	–	12	.636
TCU	10	–	8	.556	24	–	11	.686
Oklahoma State	5	–	13	.278	14	–	16	.467
Oklahoma	4	–	14	.222	8	–	22	.267
Texas Tech	4	–	14	.222	14	–	17	.452
Kansas	2	–	16	.111	13	–	18	.419
† 2019 Big 12 Tournament winner Rankings from AP poll

The 2018–19 Kansas Jayhawks women's basketball team represented the University of Kansas in the 2018–19 NCAA Division I women's basketball season. The Jayhawks were led by fourth year head coach Brandon Schneider. They played their home games at Allen Fieldhouse in Lawrence, Kansas as members of the Big 12 Conference. They finished the season 13–18, 2–16 in Big 12 play, to finish in last place. They advanced in the quarterfinals of the Big 12 Tournament, where they lost to Iowa State.

== Roster ==
2018–19 Kansas Jayhawks women's basketball team
Players
Coaches

Pos.	#	Name	Height	Year	Previous school	Hometown
G	0	Christalah Lyons	5 ft 5 in (1.65 m)	Sr	Skyline; Trinity Valley CC	Dallas, TX
C	1	Chelsea Lott	6 ft 3 in (1.91 m)	Sr	Fort Bend Hightower	Fresno, TX
G	2	Brianna Osorio	5 ft 8 in (1.73 m)	Sr	Quest Academy; Southern Idaho	Las Vegas, NV
G	3	Jessica Washington	5 ft 8 in (1.73 m)	RS Sr	Jenks; North Carolina	Tulsa, OK
F	4	Mariane de Carvalho	6 ft 2 in (1.88 m)	Jr	Highland CC	Araraquara, Brazil
G	5	Aniya Thomas	5 ft 7 in (1.7 m)	Fr	Duncanville	Duncanville, TX
G	11	Niccolly Ramalho	5 ft 5 in (1.65 m)	Jr	Highland CC	São Paulo, Brazil
F	12	Micaela Wilson	6 ft 2 in (1.88 m)	So	Rayville	Rayville, LA
F	14	Austin Richardson	6 ft 0 in (1.83 m)	Sr	Lee's Summit West; Johnson County CC	Lee's Summit, MO
G	21	Brooklyn Mitchell	5 ft 6 in (1.68 m)	Fr	Ursuline Academy	New Orleans, LA
C	31	Brittany Franklin	6 ft 5 in (1.96 m)	So	Plymouth	Plymouth, NC
G	33	Kylee Kopatich	5 ft 10 in (1.78 m)	Sr	Olathe South	Olathe, KS
C	35	Bailey Helgren	6 ft 5 in (1.96 m)	So	Edina	Edina, MN
C	50	Sara Boric	6 ft 5 in (1.96 m)	RS Sr	Tehnicka Skola; Northeast Oklahoma A&M	Kotor Varoš, Bosnia
F	55	Tyler Johnson	6 ft 2 in (1.88 m)	RS Jr	Leavenworth	Leavenworth, KS

Head coach

- Brandon Schneider (Wayland Baptist)

Assistant coach(es)

- Aqua Franklin (Texas A&M)
- Damitria Buchanan (Texas A&M)
- Jory Collins (Emporia State)

Legend

- (C) Team captain
- (S) Suspended
- (I) Ineligible
- (W) Walk-on
- Injured
- Current redshirt

Roster

== Schedule and results ==
Date time, TV	Rank^{#}	Opponent^{#}	Result	Record	Site (attendance) city, state
Exhibition
Oct 28, 2018*; 2:00 pm, JTV/ESPN+		Fort Hays State	W 90–83 ^{OT}		Allen Fieldhouse (1,619); Lawrence, KS
Nov 4, 2018*; 2:00 pm, JTV/ESPN+		Washburn	W 87–43		Allen Fieldhouse (1,906); Lawrence, KS
Non-conference regular season
Nov 7, 2018*; 7:00 pm, JTV/ESPN+		UMKC	W 67–55	1–0	Allen Fieldhouse (1,746); Lawrence, KS
Nov 13, 2018*; 7:00 pm, JTV/ESPN+		Oral Roberts	W 70–58	2–0	Allen Fieldhouse (1,819); Lawrence, KS
Nov 18, 2018*; 2:00 pm, JTV/ESPN+		Alabama A&M	W 65–54	3–0	Allen Fieldhouse (2,260); Lawrence, KS
Nov 21, 2018*; 7:00 pm, JTV/ESPN+		George Mason	W 77–56	4–0	Allen Fieldhouse (2,095); Lawrence, KS
Nov 25, 2018*; 2:00 pm, JTV/ESPN+		Iona	W 75–44	5–0	Allen Fieldhouse (1,586); Lawrence, KS
Nov 29, 2018*; 6:00 pm, SECN		at LSU; Big 12/SEC Women's Challenge	W 68–61	6–0	Maravich Center (1,604); Baton Rouge, LA
Dec 5, 2018*; 7:00 pm		at Nebraska	L 52–58	6–1	Pinnacle Bank Arena (3,688); Lincoln, NE
Dec 9, 2018*; 2:00 pm, JTV/ESPN+		Grambling State	W 76–45	7–1	Allen Fieldhouse (2,190); Lawrence, KS
Dec 19, 2018*; 4:30 pm		vs. Washington State; Duel in the Desert Desert Division semifinals	W 71–63	8–1	Cox Pavilion; Paradise, NV
Dec 19, 2018*; 7:00 pm		vs. Northwestern; Duel in the Desert Desert Division championship game	W 66–57	9–1	Cox Pavilion (751); Paradise, NV
Dec 30, 2018*; 2:00 pm, JTV/ESPN+		Vermont	W 77–36	10–1	Allen Fieldhouse (2,552); Lawrence, KS
Big 12 regular season
Jan 5, 2019; 1:00 pm, FSN		No. 25 Iowa State	L 73–82	10–2 (0–1)	Allen Fieldhouse (2,790); Lawrence, KS
Jan 9, 2019; 7:00 pm		at Texas Tech	L 66–69	10–3 (0–2)	United Supermarkets Arena (2,647); Lubbock, TX
Jan 12, 2019; 12:00 pm, FSN		at Kansas State; Sunflower Showdown	W 61–54	11–3 (1–2)	Bramlage Coliseum (5,334); Manhattan, KS
Jan 16, 2019; 7:00 pm, JTV/ESPN+		No. 2 Baylor	L 68–94	11–4 (1–3)	Allen Fieldhouse (2,229); Lawrence, KS
Jan 19, 2019; 12:00 pm, JTV/ESPN+		Oklahoma State	L 62–72	11–5 (1–4)	Allen Fieldhouse (1,792); Lawrence, KS
Jan 23, 2019; 7:00 pm, LHN		at No. 12 Texas	L 43–62	11–6 (1–5)	Frank Erwin Center (2,846); Austin, TX
Jan 27, 2019; 12:00 pm		at TCU	L 53–58	11–7 (1–6)	Schollmaier Arena (2,227); Fort Worth, TX
Jan 30, 2019; 7:00 pm, JTV/ESPN+		Oklahoma	W 88–79	12–7 (2–6)	Allen Fieldhouse (2,269); Lawrence, KS
Feb 3, 2019; 2:00 pm		at West Virginia	L 50–71	12–8 (2–7)	WVU Coliseum (3,361); Morgantown, WV
Feb 6, 2019; 7:00 pm, JTV/ESPN+		Kansas State; Sunflower Showdown	L 62–72 ^{OT}	12–9 (2–8)	Allen Fieldhouse (2,281); Lawrence, KS
Feb 9, 2019; 7:00 pm, JTV/ESPN+		No. 12 Texas	L 73–91	12–10 (2–9)	Allen Fieldhouse (2,768); Lawrence, KS
Feb 13, 2019; 7:00 pm, FSOK		at Oklahoma	L 67–78	12–11 (2–10)	Lloyd Noble Center (2,643); Norman, OK
Feb 17, 2019; 2:00 pm, JTV/ESPN+		Texas Tech	L 71–75	12–12 (3–10)	Allen Fieldhouse (4,784); Lawrence, KS
Feb 20, 2019; 6:00 pm		at No. 1 Baylor	L 40–80	12–13 (3–11)	Ferrell Center (5,230); Waco, TX
Feb 23, 2019; 1:00 pm		at Oklahoma State	L 52–72	12–14 (3–12)	Gallagher-Iba Arena (2,155); Stillwater, OK
Feb 27, 2019; 7:00 pm, JTV/ESPN+		TCU	L 66–76	12–15 (4–12)	Allen Fieldhouse (3,367); Lawrence, KS
Mar 2, 2019; 7:00 pm, JTV/ESPN+		West Virginia	L 61–76	12–16 (4–13)	Allen Fieldhouse (2,682); Lawrence, KS
Mar 4, 2019; 6:30 pm		at No. 19 Iowa State	L 49–69	12–17 (4–14)	Hilton Coliseum (10,073); Ames, IA
Big 12 Tournament
Mar 8, 2019; 8:30 pm, FCS	(10)	vs. (7) Oklahoma State; First Round	W 76–66	13–17	Chesapeake Energy Arena (3,204); Oklahoma City, OK
Mar 9, 2019; 6:00 pm, FSN	(10)	vs. (2) No. 19 Iowa State; Quarterfinals	L 58–75	13–18	Chesapeake Energy Arena; Oklahoma City, OK
*Non-conference game. ^{#}Rankings from AP Poll / Coaches' Poll. (#) Tournament seedings in parentheses. All times are in Central Time.

x- All JTV games will air on Metro Sports, ESPN3 and local affiliates.

== Rankings ==
2018–19 NCAA Division I women's basketball rankings

Regular season polls
Poll	Pre- Season	Week 2	Week 3	Week 4	Week 5	Week 6	Week 7	Week 8	Week 9	Week 10	Week 11	Week 12	Week 13	Week 14	Week 15	Week 16	Week 17	Week 18	Week 19	Final
AP					RV															N/A
Coaches				RV	RV	RV														

Legend
	Increase in ranking
	Decrease in ranking
	No change
(RV)	Received votes
(NR)	Not ranked

== See also ==
- 2018–19 Kansas Jayhawks men's basketball team
