= 2018–19 TCU Horned Frogs women's basketball team =

Intercollegiate basketball season

2018–19 TCU Horned Frogs women's basketball

WNIT, Semifinals
- Conference: Big 12 Conference
- Record: 24–11 (10–8 Big 12)
- Head coach: Raegan Pebley (5th season)
- Assistant coaches: Hanna Howard; Britney Brown; Abi Olajuwon
- Home arena: Schollmaier Arena

2018–19 Big 12 Conference women's basketball standings
| | Conf. | | | | Overall |
| Team | W | | L | PCT | W | | L | PCT |
|---|---|---|---|---|---|---|---|---|
| No. 1 Baylor † | 18 | – | 0 | 1.000 | 37 | – | 1 | .974 |
| No. 13 Iowa State | 13 | – | 5 | .722 | 26 | – | 9 | .743 |
| No. 23 Texas | 12 | – | 6 | .667 | 23 | – | 10 | .697 |
| West Virginia | 11 | – | 7 | .611 | 22 | – | 11 | .667 |
| Kansas State | 11 | – | 7 | .611 | 21 | – | 12 | .636 |
| TCU | 10 | – | 8 | .556 | 24 | – | 11 | .686 |
| Oklahoma State | 5 | – | 13 | .278 | 14 | – | 16 | .467 |
| Oklahoma | 4 | – | 14 | .222 | 8 | – | 22 | .267 |
| Texas Tech | 4 | – | 14 | .222 | 14 | – | 17 | .452 |
| Kansas | 2 | – | 16 | .111 | 13 | – | 18 | .419 |
† 2019 Big 12 Tournament winner Rankings from AP poll

The 2018–19 TCU Horned Frogs women's basketball team represented Texas Christian University in the 2018–19 NCAA Division I women's basketball season. The 2018–19 season was head coach Raegan Pebley's fifth season at TCU. The Horned Frogs were members of the Big 12 Conference and played their home games in Schollmaier Arena. They finished the season 24–11, 10–8 in Big 12 play to finish in sixth place. They lost in the quarterfinals of the Big 12 women's tournament to Texas. They received an at-large bid to the Women's National Invitation Tournament, where they defeated Prairie View A&M, UT Arlington, Arkansas in the first, second and third rounds, and Cincinnati in the quarterfinals before losing to Arizona in the semifinals.

== Roster ==
2018–19 TCU Horned Frogs women's basketball team
Players
Coaches

| Pos. | # | Name | Height | Year | Previous school | Hometown |
|---|---|---|---|---|---|---|
| F | 00 | Amy Okonkwo | 6 ft 2 in (1.88 m) | RS Sr | Etiwanda; USC | Fontana, CA |
| G | 1 | Ryann Payne | 5 ft 6 in (1.68 m) | Fr | Sierra Canyon | Valencia, CA |
| C | 2 | Becky Obinma | 6 ft 3 in (1.91 m) | Fr | Rosary Academy | Menifee, CA |
| F | 5 | Yummy Morris | 6 ft 3 in (1.91 m) | Fr | North Little Rock | North Little Rock, AR |
| G | 10 | Jaycee Bradley (redshirt) | 5 ft 10 in (1.78 m) | Sr | Norfolk; South Dakota | Norfolk, NE |
| G/F | 11 | Anneli Maley | 6 ft 2 in (1.88 m) | So | Box Hill Senior College; Oregon | Melbourne, Australia |
| G | 15 | Jayde Woods | 6 ft 1 in (1.85 m) | Jr | Windward School; Oregon | Yorba Linda, CA |
| G | 20 | Lauren Heard | 5 ft 9 in (1.75 m) | So | Guyer | Denton, TX |
| F | 21 | Alexandria Crain | 5 ft 9 in (1.75 m) | Fr | Dallas Thunder | McKinney, TX |
| C | 22 | Jordan Moore | 6 ft 3 in (1.91 m) | Sr | Stony Point | Round Rock, TX |
| G | 24 | Dakota Vann | 6 ft 0 in (1.83 m) | Sr | Deer Creek; Butler CC | Oklahoma City, OK |
| G | 25 | Kianna Ray | 6 ft 1 in (1.85 m) | Jr | Bowie | Austin, TX |
| F | 31 | Ella Hellessey | 6 ft 2 in (1.88 m) | Jr | Padua College | Dromana, Australia |
| F | 33 | Adeola Akomolafe | 6 ft 3 in (1.91 m) | RS Jr | El Dorado | El Paso, TX |

Head coach

- Raegan Pebley (Colorado)

Assistant coach(es)

- Hanna Howard (Portland)
- Britney Brown (Oklahoma)
- Abi Olajuwon (Oklahoma)

Legend

- (C) Team captain
- (S) Suspended
- (I) Ineligible
- (W) Walk-on
- Injured
- Current redshirt

Roster

== Schedule and results ==
| Date time, TV | Rank^{#} | Opponent^{#} | Result | Record | Site (attendance) city, state |
Non-conference regular season
| Nov 6, 2018*; 12:00 pm | | Duquesne | W 61–48 | 1–0 | Schollmaier Arena (3,648); Fort Worth, TX |
| Nov 11, 2018*; 12:00 pm | | Mississippi Valley State | W 96–47 | 2–0 | Schollmaier Arena (1,576); Fort Worth, TX |
| Nov 18, 2018*; 2:00 pm | | SMU | W 65–63 | 3–0 | Schollmaier Arena (1,906); Fort Worth, TX |
| Nov 23, 2018*; 9:15 pm | | vs. BYU; SDSU Thanksgiving Classic | L 68–71 | 3–1 | Viejas Arena (703); San Diego, CA |
| Nov 24, 2018*; 9:15 pm | | at San Diego State; SDSU Thanksgiving Classic | W 81–64 | 4–1 | Viejas Arena (822); San Diego, CA |
| Nov 28, 2018*; 8:00 pm | | at Ole Miss; Big 12/SEC Women's Challenge | W 55–50 | 5–1 | The Pavilion at Ole Miss (1,270); Oxford, MS |
| Dec 2, 2018*; 2:00 pm, FSSW | | Army; Maggie Dixon Classic | W 63–38 | 6–1 | Schollmaier Arena (2,154); Fort Worth, TX |
| Dec 8, 2018*; 1:00 pm | | Montana State | W 71–49 | 7–1 | Schollmaier Arena (1,879); Fort Worth, TX |
| Dec 16, 2018*; 1:00 pm | | Southern | W 69–40 | 8–1 | Schollmaier Arena (1,806); Fort Worth, TX |
| Dec 20, 2018*; 6:30 pm | | Sam Houston State | W 72–59 | 9–1 | Schollmaier Arena (1,875); Fort Worth, TX |
| Dec 29, 2018*; 2:00 pm | | Alcorn State | W 88–31 | 10–1 | Schollmaier Arena (1,691); Fort Worth, TX |
Big 12 regular season
| Jan 2, 2019; 6:30 pm | | West Virginia | W 62–48 | 11–1 (1–0) | Schollmaier Arena (1,723); Fort Worth, TX |
| Jan 6, 2019; 1:00 pm, ESPNU | | at Oklahoma State | L 71–75 | 11–2 (1–1) | Gallagher-Iba Arena (2,056); Stillwater, OK |
| Jan 9, 2019; 6:30 pm | | at No. 20 Iowa State | L 54–92 | 11–3 (1–2) | Hilton Coliseum (9,369); Ames, IA |
| Jan 12, 2019; 3:00 pm, FSSW | | No. 4 Baylor | L 55–79 | 11–4 (1–3) | Schollmaier Arena (3,844); Fort Worth, TX |
| Jan 16, 2019; 6:30 pm, FSSW | | Texas Tech | W 78–70 | 12–4 (2–3) | Schollmaier Arena (2,025); Fort Worth, TX |
| Jan 19, 2019; 1:00 pm, LHN | | at No. 11 Texas | L 67–73 | 12–5 (2–4) | Frank Erwin Center (4,105); Austin, TX |
| Jan 21, 2019; 8:00 pm, FS1 | | Oklahoma | W 86–71 | 13–5 (3–4) | Schollmaier Arena (1,929); Fort Worth, TX |
| Jan 27, 2019; 12:00 pm, FSSW | | Kansas | W 58–53 | 14–5 (4–4) | Schollmaier Arena (2,227); Fort Worth, TX |
| Jan 30, 2019; 12:00 pm, FCS | | at Kansas State | W 61–47 | 15–5 (5–4) | Bramlage Coliseum (2,676); Manhattan, KS |
| Feb 3, 2019; 2:00 pm, FSN | | Oklahoma State | W 69–55 | 16–5 (6–4) | Schollmaier Arena (2,170); Fort Worth, TX |
| Feb 6, 2019; 7:00 pm | | at Texas Tech | W 70–63 | 17–5 (7–4) | United Supermarkets Arena (2,832); Lubbock, TX |
| Feb 9, 2019; 12:00 pm, FSSW | | at No. 1 Baylor | L 71–89 | 17–6 (7–5) | Ferrell Center (6,327); Waco, TX |
| Feb 13, 2019; 6:30 pm | | Iowa State | W 76–69 | 18–6 (8–5) | Schollmaier Arena (2,556); Fort Worth, TX |
| Feb 16, 2019; 1:00 pm, FSN | | at West Virginia | L 65–79 | 18–7 (8–6) | WVU Coliseum (6,108); Morgantown, WV |
| Feb 23, 2019; 5:00 pm, FSSW+ | | Kansas State | L 72–75 | 18–8 (8–7) | Schollmaier Arena (2,606); Fort Worth, TX |
| Feb 27, 2019; 7:00 pm | | at Kansas | W 76–66 | 19–8 (9–7) | Allen Fieldhouse (3,367); Lawrence, KS |
| Mar 2, 2019; 4:30 pm, FSSW | | at Oklahoma | W 76–63 | 20–8 (10–7) | Lloyd Noble Center (3,347); Norman, OK |
| Mar 5, 2019; 6:30 pm, FSSW+ | | No. 21 Texas | L 48–62 | 20–9 (10–8) | Schollmaier Arena (2,670); Fort Worth, TX |
Big 12 Women's Tournament
| Mar 9, 2019; 8:30 pm, FSN | (6) | vs. (3) No. 21 Texas; Quarterfinals | L 64–66 | 20–10 | Chesapeake Energy Arena (3,240); Oklahoma City, OK |
WNIT
| Mar 21, 2019*; 6:30 pm | | Prairie View A&M; First Round | W 72–41 | 21–10 | Schollmaier Arena (987); Fort Worth, TX |
| Mar 23, 2019*; 2:00 pm | | UT Arlington; Second Round | W 71–54 | 22–10 | Schollmaier Arena (1,531); Fort Worth, TX |
| Mar 28, 2019*; 7:00 pm | | at Arkansas; Third Round | W 82–78 | 23–10 | Bud Walton Arena (5,287); Fayetteville, AR |
| Mar 31, 2019*; 1:00 pm | | Cincinnati; Quarterfinals | W 69–55 | 24–10 | Schollmaier Arena (2,436); Fort Worth, TX |
| Apr 3, 2019*; 8:30 pm | | at Arizona; Semifinals | L 53–59 | 24–11 | McKale Center (10,135); Tucson, AZ |
*Non-conference game. ^{#}Rankings from AP Poll / Coaches' Poll. (#) Tournament seedings in parentheses. All times are in Central Time.

Schedule and results from GoFrogs.com

== Rankings ==
Regular season polls
| Poll | Pre- season | Week 2 | Week 3 | Week 4 | Week 5 | Week 6 | Week 7 | Week 8 | Week 9 | Week 10 | Week 11 | Week 12 | Week 13 | Week 14 | Week 15 | Week 16 | Week 17 | Week 18 | Week 19 | Final |
|---|---|---|---|---|---|---|---|---|---|---|---|---|---|---|---|---|---|---|---|---|
| AP | RV | RV | RV | | | | | | | | | | | | | | | | | N/A |
| Coaches | | | | | | | | | | | | | | | | | | | | |

Legend
| | Increase in ranking |
| | Decrease in ranking |
| | Not ranked previous week |
| (RV) | Received votes |

== See also ==
- 2018–19 TCU Horned Frogs men's basketball team
