= 2018–19 West Virginia Mountaineers women's basketball team =

American college basketball season

2018–19 West Virginia Mountaineers women's basketball

WNIT, Third Round
- Conference: Big 12 Conference
- Record: 22–11 (11–7 Big 12)
- Head coach: Mike Carey (18th season)
- Assistant coaches: Chester Nichols; Lester Rowe; Christal Caldwell
- Home arena: WVU Coliseum

2018–19 Big 12 Conference women's basketball standings
	Conf.				Overall
Team	W		L	PCT	W		L	PCT
No. 1 Baylor †	18	–	0	1.000	37	–	1	.974
No. 13 Iowa State	13	–	5	.722	26	–	9	.743
No. 23 Texas	12	–	6	.667	23	–	10	.697
West Virginia	11	–	7	.611	22	–	11	.667
Kansas State	11	–	7	.611	21	–	12	.636
TCU	10	–	8	.556	24	–	11	.686
Oklahoma State	5	–	13	.278	14	–	16	.467
Oklahoma	4	–	14	.222	8	–	22	.267
Texas Tech	4	–	14	.222	14	–	17	.452
Kansas	2	–	16	.111	13	–	18	.419
† 2019 Big 12 Tournament winner Rankings from AP poll

The 2018–19 West Virginia Mountaineers women's basketball team represented West Virginia University during the 2018–19 NCAA Division I women's basketball season. The Mountaineers were coached by eighteenth-year head coach Mike Carey, played their home games at WVU Coliseum and were members of the Big 12 Conference. They finished the season 22–11, 11–7, in the 'Big 12' play to finish in a tie for the fourth place. They lost in the quarterfinals of the Big 12 women's tournament to Kansas State. They received an automatic bid to the Women's National Invitation Tournament, where they defeated Rider and Villanova in the first and second rounds before losing to Northwestern in the third round.

== Previous season ==
The Mountaineers finished the season 25–12, 8–10 in Big 12 play to finish in sixth place. They advanced to the semifinals of the Big 12 women's tournament where they lost to Texas. They received an automatic bid to the Women's National Invitation Tournament where they defeated Bucknell, Saint Joseph's and James Madison in the first, second and third rounds, St. John's in the quarterfinals before losing to Virginia Tech in the semifinals.

== Roster ==
2018–19 West Virginia Mountaineers women's basketball team
Players
Coaches

Pos.	#	Name	Height	Year	Previous school	Hometown
G/F	0	Naomi Davenport	6 ft 0 in (1.83 m)	Sr	Mount Notre Dame; Trinity Valley CC	Cincinnati, OH
G	2	Kysre Gondrezick	5 ft 9 in (1.75 m)	RS So	Benton Harbor; Michigan	Benton Harbor, MI
G	4	Nia Staples	5 ft 9 in (1.75 m)	RS So	Lakota West	Cincinnati, OH
G	5	Tynice Martin	5 ft 10 in (1.78 m)	RS Jr	Southwest Atlanta Christian Academy	Atlanta, GA
F	12	Jala Jordan	6 ft 2 in (1.88 m)	Fr	IMG Academy	Philadelphia, PA
F	14	Kari Niblack	6 ft 1 in (1.85 m)	Fr	Wildwood	Leesburg, FL
G	15	Lucky Rudd	5 ft 9 in (1.75 m)	Jr	New Hope Christian Academy; NC State	Thomasville, NC
G	22	Katrina Pardee	5 ft 9 in (1.75 m)	Sr	Vista Ridge	Cedar Park, TX
G	30	Madisen Smith	5 ft 5 in (1.65 m)	Fr	Greenville Senior	Greenville, SC
C	31	Rochelle Norris	6 ft 5 in (1.96 m)	Fr	New Hope Academy	Stafford, VA
C	34	Theresa Ekhelar	6 ft 6 in (1.98 m)	RS Sr	Life Center Academy	Woodbridge, NJ
F	35	De'Janae Boykin	6 ft 2 in (1.88 m)	RS Jr	Charles Herbert Flowers; Penn State	Springdale, MD

Head coach

- Mike Carey (Salem)

Assistant coach(es)

- Chester Nichols (Greenville)
- Lester Rowe (West Virginia)
- Christal Caldwell (West Virginia)

Legend

- (C) Team captain
- (S) Suspended
- (I) Ineligible
- (W) Walk-on
- Injured
- Current redshirt

Roster

== Schedule ==
Date time, TV	Rank^{#}	Opponent^{#}	Result	Record	Site (attendance) city, state
Exhibition
Oct 30, 2018*; 7:00 pm		West Liberty	W 88–53		WVU Coliseum (2,089); Morgantown, WV
Non-conference regular season
Nov 6, 2018*; 7:00 pm		Coppin State	W 78–37	1–0	WVU Coliseum (1,103); Morgantown, WV
Nov 11, 2018*; 2:00 pm		NJIT	W 95–50	2–0	WVU Coliseum (1,209); Morgantown, WV
Nov 15, 2018*; 10:00 am		Bryant	W 94–48	3–0	WVU Coliseum (9,607); Morgantown, WV
Nov 23, 2018*; 5:15 pm	No. 25	vs. No. 12 Iowa; Junkanoo Jam Bimini Division semifinals	L 81–84	3–1	Gateway Christian Academy; Bimini, Bahamas
Nov 24, 2018*; 4:15 pm	No. 25	vs. Eastern Kentucky; Junkanoo Jam Bimini Division 3rd place game	W 81–39	4–1	Gateway Christian Academy (250); Bimini, Bahamas
Dec 2, 2018*; 5:00 pm, Netstar		Missouri; Big 12/SEC Women's Challenge	L 51–68	4–2	WVU Coliseum (1,273); Morgantown, WV
Dec 8, 2018*; 3:00 pm		at Pittsburgh; Backyard Brawl	W 77–43	5–2	Peterson Events Center (674); Pittsburgh, PA
Dec 15, 2018*; 4:00 pm		vs. Eastern Kentucky	W 78–29	6–2	Charleston Civic Center (1,856); Charleston, WV
Dec 18, 2018*; 7:00 pm		Morgan State	W 72–37	7–2	WVU Coliseum (1,363); Morgantown, WV
Dec 20, 2018*; 7:00 pm		Towson	W 90–43	8–2	WVU Coliseum (1,108); Morgantown, WV
Dec 29, 2018*; 2:00 pm		Niagara	W 84–32	9–2	WVU Coliseum (2,026); Morgantown, WV
Big 12 regular season
Jan 2, 2019; 7:30 pm		at TCU	L 48–62	9–3 (0–1)	Schollmaier Arena (1,723); Fort Worth, TX
Jan 6, 2019; 4:00 pm, ESPN2		No. 13 Texas	L 58–70	9–4 (0–2)	WVU Coliseum (2,932); Morgantown, WV
Jan 9, 2019; 7:00 pm, Netstar		Oklahoma State	W 67–58	10–4 (1–2)	WVU Coliseum (1,119); Morgantown, WV
Jan 13, 2019; 3:00 pm		at Oklahoma	W 66–55	11–4 (2–2)	Lloyd Noble Center (3,171); Norman, OK
Jan 16, 2019; 7:00 pm		No. 18 Iowa State	W 73–64	12–4 (3–2)	WVU Coliseum (1,512); Morgantown, WV
Jan 20, 2019; 5:00 pm, FS1		at No. 2 Baylor	L 47–79	12–5 (3–3)	Ferrell Center (5,750); Waco, TX
Jan 23, 2019; 6:00 pm, FSN		Texas Tech	W 68–65	13–5 (4–3)	WVU Coliseum (1,436); Morgantown, WV
Jan 26, 2019; 4:00 pm		Kansas State	W 60–30	14–5 (5–3)	WVU Coliseum (3,229); Morgantown, WV
Jan 28, 2019; 8:00 pm, FS1		at No. 12 Texas	W 64–58	15–5 (6–3)	Frank Erwin Center (3,052); Austin, TX
Feb 3, 2019; 3:00 pm, ATTSNPT		Kansas	W 71–50	16–5 (7–3)	WVU Coliseum (3,361); Morgantown, WV
Feb 9, 2019; 7:00 pm		at No. 23 Iowa State	L 61–77	16–6 (7–4)	Hilton Coliseum (10,408); Ames, IA
Feb 13, 2019; 7:00 pm		at Texas Tech	W 75–72	17–6 (8–4)	United Supermarkets Arena (3,015); Lubbock, TX
Feb 16, 2019; 2:00 pm, FSN		TCU	W 79–65	18–6 (9–4)	WVU Coliseum (6,108); Morgantown, WV
Feb 20, 2019; 7:00 pm		at Oklahoma State	W 77–64	19–6 (10–4)	Gallagher-Iba Arena (1,683); Stillwater, OK
Feb 23, 2019; 4:00 pm, ATTSNPT		Oklahoma	L 69–80	19–7 (10–5)	WVU Coliseum (4,823); Morgantown, WV
Feb 27, 2019; 8:00 pm		at Kansas State	L 79–90	19–8 (10–6)	Bramlage Coliseum (2,814); Manhattan, KS
Mar 2, 2019; 8:00 pm		at Kansas	W 75–61	20–8 (11–6)	Allen Fieldhouse (2,682); Lawrence, KS
Mar 4, 2019; 7:00 pm, FS1		No. 1 Baylor	L 57–63	20–9 (11–7)	WVU Coliseum (3,087); Morgantown, WV
Big 12 Women's Tournament
Mar 9, 2019; 12:00 pm, FSN	(4)	vs. (5) Kansas State; Quarterfinals	L 59–72	20–10	Chesapeake Energy Arena (3,353); Oklahoma City, OK
WNIT
Mar 21, 2019*; 7:00 pm		Rider; First Round	W 83–43	21–10	WVU Coliseum (1,032); Morgantown, WV
Mar 24, 2019*; 3:00 pm		Villanova; Second Round	W 64–57	22–10	WVU Coliseum (1,388); Morgantown, WV
Mar 27, 2019*; 7:00 pm		Northwestern; Third Round	L 54–56	22–11	WVU Coliseum (1,314); Morgantown, WV
*Non-conference game. ^{#}Rankings from AP Poll. (#) Tournament seedings in parentheses. All times are in Eastern Time.

== Rankings ==
Ranking movements Legend: ██ Increase in ranking ██ Decrease in ranking — = Not ranked RV = Received votes
	Week																			
Poll	Pre	1	2	3	4	5	6	7	8	9	10	11	12	13	14	15	16	17	18	Final
AP	RV	RV	25	RV	RV	RV	RV	RV	—	—	—	—	—	RV	RV	RV	RV	—	—	Not released
Coaches	25	25^	20	21	RV	RV	RV	RV	RV	—	—	—	RV	RV	—	RV	—	—	—	

^Coaches' Poll did not release a second poll at the same time as the AP.
