= 2018–19 Baylor Lady Bears basketball team =

Intercollegiate basketball season

2018–19 Baylor Lady Bears basketball

NCAA tournament National champions Big 12 regular season champions Big 12 Tournament champions
- Conference: Big 12 Conference

Ranking
- Coaches: No. 1
- AP: No. 1
- Record: 37–1 (19–0 Big 12)
- Head coach: Kim Mulkey (19th season)
- Assistant coaches: Bill Brock; Sytia Messer; Toyelle Wilson
- Home arena: Ferrell Center

2018–19 Big 12 Conference women's basketball standings
	Conf.				Overall
Team	W		L	PCT	W		L	PCT
No. 1 Baylor †	18	–	0	1.000	37	–	1	.974
No. 13 Iowa State	13	–	5	.722	26	–	9	.743
No. 23 Texas	12	–	6	.667	23	–	10	.697
West Virginia	11	–	7	.611	22	–	11	.667
Kansas State	11	–	7	.611	21	–	12	.636
TCU	10	–	8	.556	24	–	11	.686
Oklahoma State	5	–	13	.278	14	–	16	.467
Oklahoma	4	–	14	.222	8	–	22	.267
Texas Tech	4	–	14	.222	14	–	17	.452
Kansas	2	–	16	.111	13	–	18	.419
† 2019 Big 12 Tournament winner Rankings from AP poll

The 2018–19 Baylor Lady Bears basketball team represented Baylor University in the 2018–19 NCAA Division I women's basketball season. Returning as head coach was Hall of Famer Kim Mulkey for her 19th season. The team played its home games at the Ferrell Center in Waco, Texas and were members of the Big 12 Conference. They finished the season ranked #1 in the nation, with a record of 37–1, 18–0 in Big 12 to win the Big 12 regular season title. They also won the Big 12 women's tournament and earned an automatic bid to the NCAA women's tournament, where they advanced to defeat Notre Dame in the championship game for the third title in team history.

== Previous season ==
The Lady Bears finished the season 33–2, 18–0 in Big 12 to win the Big 12 regular season title. They also won the Big 12 women's tournament and earned an automatic bid to the NCAA women's tournament where they defeated Grambling State and Michigan in the first and second rounds before getting upset by Oregon State in the sweet sixteen.

== Roster ==
2018–19 Baylor Bears women's basketball team
Players
Coaches

Pos.	#	Name	Height	Year	Previous school	Hometown
F	1	NaLyssa Smith	6 ft 2 in (1.88 m)	Fr	East Central HS	Converse, TX
G	2	DiDi Richards	6 ft 1 in (1.85 m)	So	Cypress Ranch HS	Cypress, TX
G	3	Trinity Oliver	5 ft 11 in (1.8 m)	RS Fr	Trinity HS	Euless, TX
G	4	Honesty Scott-Grayson	5 ft 9 in (1.75 m)	Fr	Riverdale Baptist HS	Brick Township, NJ
F	10	Aquira DeCosta	6 ft 0 in (1.83 m)	Fr	St. Mary's HS	Sacramento, CA
G	12	Moon Ursin	5 ft 7 in (1.7 m)	So	Destrehan HS	Destrehan, LA
F	15	Lauren Cox	6 ft 4 in (1.93 m)	Jr	Flower Mound HS	Flower Mound, TX
G	20	Juicy Landrum	5 ft 9 in (1.75 m)	Jr	La Vega HS	Waco, TX
C	21	Kalani Brown	6 ft 7 in (2.01 m)	Sr	Salmen HS	Slidell, LA
G	24	Chloe Jackson	5 ft 8 in (1.73 m)	RS Sr	LSU	Upper Marlboro, MD
C	25	Queen Egbo	6 ft 3 in (1.91 m)	Fr	Travis HS	Houston, TX
F	51	Caitlin Bickle	6 ft 0 in (1.83 m)	Fr	Cactus Shadows HS	Cave Creek, AZ

Head coach

- Kim Mulkey (Louisiana Tech)

Assistant coach(es)

- Bill Brock (SE Oklahoma State)
- Sytia Messer (Arkansas)
- Toyelle Wilson (Manhattan)
- Makenzie Robertson Fuller (Baylor)

Legend

- (C) Team captain
- (S) Suspended
- (I) Ineligible
- (W) Walk-on
- Injured
- Current redshirt

Roster

== Rankings ==
Ranking movements Legend: ██ Increase in ranking ██ Decrease in ranking т = Tied with team above or below ( ) = First-place votes
	Week																			
Poll	Pre	1	2	3	4	5	6	7	8	9	10	11	12	13	14	15	16	17	18	Final
AP	4	4	4	4	4	3	6	7	8	4 (5)	2-T (6)	2 (7)	1 (24)	1 (25)	1 (26)	1 (28)	1 (28)	1 (28)	1 (28)	Not released
Coaches	5	5^	5	5	5	4	6	6	7	4 (2)	3 (2)	3 (2)	1 (19)	1 (27)	1 (32)	1 (31)	1 (31)	1 (31)	1 (32)	1 (32)

^Coaches' Poll did not release a second poll at the same time as the AP.

== Schedule and results ==
Date time, TV	Rank^{#}	Opponent^{#}	Result	Record	Site (attendance) city, state
Exhibition
Oct 26, 2018*; 7:00 pm	No. 4	Langston	W 110–45		Ferrell Center; Waco, TX
Nov 1, 2018*; 7:00 pm	No. 4	Texas A&M–Commerce	W 127–61		Ferrell Center; Waco, TX
Non-conference regular season
Nov 6, 2018*; 6:00 pm	No. 4	Nicholls	W 100–39	1–0	Ferrell Center (4,866); Waco, TX
Nov 8, 2018*; 7:00 pm, FSSW+	No. 4	Saint Francis	W 116–58	2–0	Ferrell Center (4,578); Waco, TX
Nov 11, 2018*; 6:30 pm, ESPN2	No. 4	vs. No. 23 Arizona State; Showdown on the Rez	W 65–59	3–0	Bee Hółdzil Fighting Scouts Events Center (5,609); Fort Defiance, AZ
Nov 15, 2018*; 6:00 pm, FSSW	No. 4	Southern	W 94–49	4–0	Ferrell Center (4,747); Waco, TX
Nov 23, 2018*; 6:30 pm	No. 4	vs. South Dakota State; South Point Thanksgiving Shootout	W 72–66	5–0	South Point Events Center; Enterprise, NV
Nov 24, 2018*; 9:30 pm	No. 4	vs. Georgetown; South Point Thanksgiving Shootout	W 67–46	6–0	South Point Events Center (477); Enterprise, NV
Dec 2, 2018*; 6:00 pm, ESPN2	No. 4	at No. 18 South Carolina; Big 12/SEC Women's Challenge	W 94–69	7–0	Colonial Life Arena (10,531); Columbia, SC
Dec 12, 2018*; 12:00 pm, FSSW	No. 3	Morehead State	W 96–58	8–0	Ferrell Center (9,627); Waco, TX
Dec 15, 2018*; 2:00 pm, P12N	No. 3	at No. 11 Stanford	L 63–68	8–1	Maples Pavilion (3,440); Stanford, CA
Dec 31, 2018*; 12:00 pm	No. 8	Texas–Rio Grande Valley	W 98–37	9–1	Ferrell Center (5,047); Waco, TX
Jan 3, 2019*; 8:00 pm, ESPN	No. 8	No. 1 UConn	W 68–57	10–1	Ferrell Center (10,284); Waco, TX
Big 12 regular season
Jan 6, 2019; 12:00 pm, FSN	No. 8	at Texas Tech	W 73–56	11–1 (1–0)	United Supermarkets Arena (4,355); Lubbock, TX
Jan 9, 2019; 7:00 pm, FSGO	No. 4	Kansas State	W 65–50	12–1 (2–0)	Ferrell Center (5,025); Waco, TX
Jan 12, 2019; 3:00 pm, FSSW	No. 4	at TCU	W 79–55	13–1 (3–0)	Schollmaier Arena (3,844); Fort Worth, TX
Jan 16, 2019; 7:00 pm	No. 2	at Kansas	W 94–68	14–1 (4–0)	Allen Fieldhouse (2,229); Lawrence, KS
Jan 20, 2019; 4:00 pm, FS1	No. 2	West Virginia	W 79–47	15–1 (5–0)	Ferrell Center (5,750); Waco, TX
Jan 23, 2019; 7:00 pm, FSSW	No. 2	No. 20 Iowa State	W 84–69	16–1 (6–0)	Ferrell Center (5,285); Waco, TX
Jan 27, 2019; 2:00 pm, FSN	No. 2	at Oklahoma	W 74–53	17–1 (7–0)	Lloyd Noble Center (3,478); Norman, OK
Jan 30, 2019; 7:00 pm, FSSW Alt.	No. 1	at Oklahoma State	W 66–58	18–1 (8–0)	Gallagher-Iba Arena (1,958); Stillwater, OK
Feb 2, 2019; 1:00 pm, FSSW	No. 1	Texas Tech	W 96–37	19–1 (9–0)	Ferrell Center (6,432); Waco, TX
Feb 4, 2019; 6:00 pm, ESPN2	No. 1	at No. 12 Texas	W 74–68	20–1 (10–0)	Frank Erwin Center (5,393); Austin, TX
Feb 9, 2019; 12:00 pm, FSSW	No. 1	TCU	W 89–71	21–1 (11–0)	Ferrell Center (6,327); Waco, TX
Feb 13, 2019; 6:00 pm	No. 1	at Kansas State	W 71–48	22–1 (12–0)	Bramlage Coliseum (3,481); Manhattan, KS
Feb 16, 2019; 7:00 pm, FSSW+	No. 1	Oklahoma	W 87–53	23–1 (13–0)	Ferrell Center (6,168); Waco, TX
Feb 20, 2019; 6:00 pm, FSSW	No. 1	Kansas	W 80–40	24–1 (14–0)	Ferrell Center (5,230); Waco, TX
Feb 23, 2019; 3:00 pm, FSN	No. 1	at No. 20 Iowa State	W 73–60	25–1 (15–0)	Hilton Coliseum (11,143); Ames, IA
Feb 25, 2019; 6:00 pm, FS1	No. 1	No. 18 Texas	W 64–35	26–1 (16–0)	Ferrell Center (6,875); Waco, TX
Mar 2, 2019; 1:00 pm, FSSW	No. 1	Oklahoma State	W 76–44	27–1 (17–0)	Ferrell Center (5,955); Waco, TX
Mar 4, 2019; 6:00 pm, FS1	No. 1	at West Virginia	W 63–57	28–1 (18–0)	WVU Coliseum (3,087); Morgantown, WV
Big 12 women's tournament
Mar 9, 2019; 1:30 pm, FSN	(1) No. 1	vs. (9) Texas Tech; Quarterfinals	W 100–61	29–1	Chesapeake Energy Arena; Oklahoma City, OK
Mar 10, 2019; 2:00 pm, FS1	(1) No. 1	vs. (5) Kansas State; Semifinals	W 88–60	30–1	Chesapeake Energy Arena; Oklahoma City, OK
Mar 11, 2019; 8:00 pm, FS1	(1) No. 1	vs. (2) No. 13 Iowa State; Championship Game	W 67–49	31–1	Chesapeake Energy Arena (3,272); Oklahoma City, OK
NCAA women's tournament
Mar 23, 2019*; 5:00 pm, ESPN2	(1 G) No. 1	(16 G) Abilene Christian; First round	W 95–38	32–1	Ferrell Center (6,669); Waco, TX
Mar 25, 2019*; 8:00 pm, ESPN	(1 G) No. 1	(8 G) California; Second round	W 102–63	33–1	Ferrell Center (5,367); Waco, TX
Mar 30, 2019*; 1:00 pm, ESPN	(1 G) No. 1	vs. (4 G) No. 15 South Carolina; Sweet Sixteen	W 93–68	34–1	Greensboro Coliseum (6,544); Greensboro, NC
Apr 1, 2019*; 6:00 pm, ESPN2	(1 G) No. 1	vs. (2 G) No. 8 Iowa; Elite Eight	W 85–53	35–1	Greensboro Coliseum (4,164); Greensboro, NC
Apr 5, 2019*; 6:00 pm, ESPN2	(1 G) No. 1	vs. (2 P) No. 7 Oregon; Final Four	W 72–67	36–1	Amalie Arena (20,062); Tampa, FL
Apr 7, 2019*; 5:00 pm, ESPN	(1 G) No. 1	vs. (1 C) No. 2 Notre Dame; National Championship	W 82–81	37–1	Amalie Arena (20,127); Tampa, FL
*Non-conference game. ^{#}Rankings from AP Poll. (#) Tournament seedings in parentheses. G=Greensboro Region. All times are in Central Time.
