= 2018–19 Texas Longhorns women's basketball team =

Intercollegiate basketball season

2018–19 Texas Longhorns women's basketball

Gulf Coast Showcase Champions

NCAA tournament, first round
- Conference: Big 12 Conference

Ranking
- AP: No. 23
- Record: 23–10 (12–6 Big 12)
- Head coach: Karen Aston (7th season)
- Assistant coaches: Jamie Carey; George Washington; Tiffany Jackson
- Home arena: Frank Erwin Center

2018–19 Big 12 Conference women's basketball standings
	Conf.				Overall
Team	W		L	PCT	W		L	PCT
No. 1 Baylor †	18	–	0	1.000	37	–	1	.974
No. 13 Iowa State	13	–	5	.722	26	–	9	.743
No. 23 Texas	12	–	6	.667	23	–	10	.697
West Virginia	11	–	7	.611	22	–	11	.667
Kansas State	11	–	7	.611	21	–	12	.636
TCU	10	–	8	.556	24	–	11	.686
Oklahoma State	5	–	13	.278	14	–	16	.467
Oklahoma	4	–	14	.222	8	–	22	.267
Texas Tech	4	–	14	.222	14	–	17	.452
Kansas	2	–	16	.111	13	–	18	.419
† 2019 Big 12 Tournament winner Rankings from AP poll

The 2018–19 Texas Longhorns women's basketball team represented the University of Texas at Austin in the 2018–19 NCAA Division I women's basketball season. It was head coach Karen Aston's seventh season at Texas. The Longhorns were members of the Big 12 Conference and played their home games at the Frank Erwin Center. They finished the season 23–10, 12–6 in Big 12 play to finish in third place. They advanced to the championship game of the Big 12 women's basketball tournament, where they lost to Iowa State. They received an at-large bid to the NCAA women's basketball tournament, as a 10th seed in the Portland Regional, where they lost to 7th seed Indiana in the first round.

== Previous season ==
The Longhorns finished the season 28–7, 15–3 in Big 12 play to finish in second place. They advanced to the championship game of the Big 12 women's basketball tournament, where they lost to Baylor. They received an at-large bid to the NCAA women's basketball tournament, where they defeated Maine and Arizona State in the first and second rounds before losing to UCLA in the sweet sixteen.

== Offseason ==
=== Departures ===
Name	Number	Pos.	Height	Year	Hometown	Reason for departure
Jordan Hosey	5	F	6'1"	Junior	Pearland, TX	Graduate transferred
Brooke McCarthy	11	G	5'4"	Senior	League City, TX	Graduated
Chasity Patterson	15	G	5'5"	Sophomore	Houston, TX	Departed the team on November 10, 2018 having only played in the Duquesne game.
Ariel Atkins	23	G	5'11"	Senior	Duncanville, TX	Graduated
Khaléann Caron-Goudreau	30	F	6'4"	RS junior	Gatineau, QE	Graduate transferred to Laval
Audrey Ann Caron-Goudreau	31	F	6'4"	Senior	Gatineau, QE	Graduated
Rellah Boothe	35	F	6'3"	Freshman	Ocala, FL	Transferred to Middle Tennessee

=== Incoming transfers ===
Name	Pos.	Height	Year	Hometown	Previous school
Danni Williams	G	5'10"	Senior	Clovis, MN	Transferred from Texas A&M. Was eligible to play immediately, since she graduated from Texas A&M.

=== Recruits ===
College recruiting
Name	Hometown	School	Height	Weight	Commit date
Charli Collier; F	Crosby, TX	Barbers Hill High School	6 ft 5 in (1.96 m)	N/A	
Charli Collier; F	Recruit ratings: ESPN: (98)				
Sedona Prince; P	Liberty Hill, TX	Liberty Hill High School	6 ft 7 in (2.01 m)	N/A	
Sedona Prince; P	Recruit ratings: ESPN: (98)				
Joanne Allen-Taylor; G	Houston, TX	Cypress Falls High School	5 ft 8 in (1.73 m)	N/A	
Joanne Allen-Taylor; G	Recruit ratings: ESPN: (95)				
Shae Routt; W	Austin, TX	Akins High School	6 ft 0 in (1.83 m)	N/A	
Shae Routt; W	Recruit ratings: ESPN: (90)				
Audrey Warren; G	Fort Worth, TX	W. E. Boswell High School	5 ft 9 in (1.75 m)	N/A	
Audrey Warren; G	Recruit ratings: ESPN: (90)				
Overall recruiting rankings:
Note: In many cases, Scout, Rivals, 247Sports, and ESPN may conflict in their listings of height and weight.; In these cases, the average was taken. ESPN grades are on a 100-point scale.; Sources: "2018 Player Commits". ESPN.com.

== Roster ==
2018–19 Texas Longhorns women's basketball team
Players
Coaches

Pos.	#	Name	Height	Year	Previous school	Hometown
G	1	Alecia Sutton	5 ft 8 in (1.73 m)	Jr	Parkway North	St. Louis, MO
G	3	Danni Williams	5 ft 10 in (1.78 m)	Sr	Clovis; Texas A&M	Clovis, NM
G	4	Destiny Littleton	5 ft 9 in (1.75 m)	So	The Bishop's School	La Jolla, CA
G	10	Lashann Higgs	5 ft 9 in (1.75 m)	Sr	Cedar Ridge	Round Rock, TX
G	11	Joanne Allen-Taylor	5 ft 8 in (1.73 m)	Fr	Cypress Falls	Houston, TX
G/F	12	Jada Underwood	6 ft 0 in (1.83 m)	Jr	Horn	Mesquite, TX
F	14	Olamide Aborowa	6 ft 3 in (1.91 m)	Sr	Neumann-Goretti	Ondo, Nigeria
G/F	22	Shae Routt	6 ft 0 in (1.83 m)	Fr	Akins	Austin, TX
C	23	Sedona Prince	6 ft 7 in (2.01 m)	Fr	Liberty Hill	Liberty Hill, TX
G/F	24	Joyner Holmes	6 ft 3 in (1.91 m)	Jr	Cedar Hill	Cedar Hill, TX
G/F	31	Audrey Warren	5 ft 9 in (1.75 m)	Fr	Boswell	Fort Worth, TX
F/C	35	Charli Collier	6 ft 5 in (1.96 m)	Fr	Barbers Hill	Mont Belvieu, TX
F/C	40	Jatarie White	6 ft 4 in (1.93 m)	RS Sr	Providence Day; South Carolina	Charlotte, NC

Head coach

- Karen Aston (Little Rock)

Assistant coach(es)

- Jamie Carey (Stanford)
- George Washington (Abilene Christian)
- Tiffany Jackson (Texas)

Legend

- (C) Team captain
- (S) Suspended
- (I) Ineligible
- (W) Walk-on
- Injured
- Current redshirt

Roster

== Schedule ==
Date time, TV	Rank^{#}	Opponent^{#}	Result	Record	Site city, state
Exhibition
Oct 28, 2018*; 1:00 pm, LHN	No. 11	West Texas A&M	W 91–63		Frank Erwin Center (1,013); Austin, TX
Non-conference regular season
Nov 8, 2018*; 7:00 pm, LHN	No. 11	Duquesne	W 78–41	1–0	Frank Erwin Center (2,880); Austin, TX
Nov 12, 2018*; 7:00 pm, ESPN+	No. 11	at North Texas	W 64–54	2–0	The Super Pit (2,497); Denton, TX
Nov 15, 2018*; 7:00 pm, LHN	No. 11	McNeese State	W 96–40	3–0	Frank Erwin Center (2,950); Austin, TX
Nov 23, 2018*; 4:00 pm	No. 10	vs. Quinnipiac; Gulf Coast Showcase Quarterfinals	W 56–55	4–0	Hertz Arena (1,107); Estero, FL
Nov 24, 2018*; 6:30 pm	No. 10	vs. Michigan; Gulf Coast Showcase Semifinals	W 69–52	5–0	Hertz Arena; Estero, FL
Nov 25, 2018*; 6:30 pm	No. 10	vs. Fordham; Gulf Coast Showcase championship	W 72–54	6–0	Hertz Arena; Estero, FL
Nov 28, 2018*; 11:00 am, LHN	No. 10	UTSA	W 98–54	7–0	Frank Erwin Center (9,495); Austin, TX
Dec 2, 2018*; 1:00 pm, FS1	No. 10	No. 6 Mississippi State; Big 12/SEC Women's Challenge	L 49–67	7–1	Frank Erwin Center (4,579); Austin, TX
Dec 9, 2018*; 12:00 pm, ESPN2	No. 12	No. 9 Tennessee	L 82–88	7–2	Frank Erwin Center (4,275); Austin, TX
Dec 16, 2018*; 1:00 pm, LHN	No. 12	Stetson	W 65–46	8–2	Frank Erwin Center (3,088); Austin, TX
Dec 20, 2018*; 7:00 pm	No. 12	at Texas–Rio Grande Valley	W 81–66	9–2	UTRGV Fieldhouse (2,655); Edinburg, TX
Dec 29, 2018*; 1:00 pm, LHN	No. 13	Northwestern State	W 104–66	10–2	Frank Erwin Center (3,325); Austin, TX
Big 12 regular season
Jan 2, 2019; 7:00 pm, LHN	No. 13	Oklahoma State	W 60–51	11–2 (1–0)	Frank Erwin Center (3,088); Austin, TX
Jan 6, 2019; 3:00 pm, ESPN2	No. 13	at West Virginia	W 70–58	12–2 (2–0)	WVU Coliseum (2,932); Morgantown, WV
Jan 9, 2019; 7:00 pm, LHN	No. 11	Oklahoma	W 73–63	13–2 (3–0)	Frank Erwin Center (3,494); Austin, TX
Jan 12, 2019; 4:00 pm	No. 11	at No. 20 Iowa State	W 64–62	14–2 (4–0)	Hilton Coliseum (10,983); Ames, IA
Jan 16, 2019; 7:00 pm, ESPN3	No. 11	at Kansas State	L 69–87	14–3 (4–1)	Bramlage Coliseum (2,811); Manhattan, KS
Jan 19, 2019; 1:00 pm, LHN	No. 11	TCU	W 73–67	15–3 (5–1)	Frank Erwin Center (4,107); Austin, TX
Jan 23, 2019; 7:00 pm, LHN	No. 12	Kansas	W 62–43	16–3 (6–1)	Frank Erwin Center (2,846); Austin, TX
Jan 26, 2019; 12:00 pm	No. 12	at Texas Tech	W 78–71	17–3 (7–1)	United Supermarkets Arena (4,356); Lubbock, TX
Jan 28, 2019; 7:00 pm, FS1	No. 12	West Virginia	L 58–64	17–4 (7–2)	Frank Erwin Center (3,052); Austin, TX
Feb 2, 2019; 3:00 pm, FSSW	No. 12	at Oklahoma	W 76–67	18–4 (8–2)	Lloyd Noble Center (4,026); Norman, OK
Feb 4, 2019; 6:00 pm, ESPN2	No. 12	No. 1 Baylor	L 68–74	18–5 (8–3)	Frank Erwin Center (5,393); Austin, TX
Feb 9, 2019; 7:00 pm, ESPN+	No. 12	at Kansas	W 91–73	19–5 (9–3)	Allen Fieldhouse (2,768); Lawrence, KS
Feb 12, 2019; 7:00 pm	No. 15	at Oklahoma State	W 61–55	20–5 (10–3)	Gallagher-Iba Arena (1,997); Stillwater, OK
Feb 17, 2019; 4:00 pm, FSN	No. 15	Kansas State	L 60–69	20–6 (10–4)	Frank Erwin Center (4,061); Austin, TX
Feb 23, 2019; 11:00 am, LHN	No. 19	Texas Tech	W 81–57	21–6 (11–4)	Frank Erwin Center (3,884); Austin, TX
Feb 25, 2019; 6:00 pm, FS1	No. 18	at No. 1 Baylor	L 35–64	21–7 (11–5)	Ferrell Center (6,835); Waco, TX
Mar 2, 2019; 7:00 pm, LHN	No. 18	No. 20 Iowa State	L 73–82	21–8 (11–6)	Frank Erwin Center (4,052); Austin, TX
Mar 5, 2019; 6:30 pm, FSSW+	No. 21	at TCU	W 62–48	22–8 (12–6)	Schollmaier Arena (2,670); Fort Worth, TX
Big 12 Women's Tournament
Mar 9, 2019; 8:30 pm, FSN	(3) No. 21	vs. (6) TCU; Quarterfinals	W 66–64	23–8	Chesapeake Energy Arena (3,240); Oklahoma City, OK
Mar 10, 2019; 4:30 pm, FS1	(3) No. 21	vs. (2) No. 19 Iowa State; Quarterfinals	L 69–75	23–9	Chesapeake Energy Arena; Oklahoma City, OK
NCAA Women's Tournament
Mar 22, 2019*; 6:00 pm, ESPN2	(7 P) No. 23	vs. (10 P) Indiana; First Round	L 65–69	23–10	Matthew Knight Arena; Eugene, OR
*Non-conference game. ^{#}Rankings from AP Poll. (#) Tournament seedings in parentheses. P=Portland Region. All times are in Central Time.

== Rankings ==
Regular season polls
Poll	Pre- season	Week 2	Week 3	Week 4	Week 5	Week 6	Week 7	Week 8	Week 9	Week 10	Week 11	Week 12	Week 13	Week 14	Week 15	Week 16	Week 17	Week 18	Week 19	Final
AP	11	11	10	10	12	12	12	13	13	11	11	12	12	12	15	19	18	21	22	23
Coaches	8	8^	9	10	12	12	12	12	12	11	11	13	14	15	15	19	19	22	24	NR

Legend
	Increase in ranking
	Decrease in ranking
	No change
(RV)	Received votes
(NR)	Not ranked

^Coaches did not release a Week 2 poll.

== 2018–19 media ==
=== Television and radio information ===
Most University of Texas home games were shown on the Longhorn Network, with national telecasts on the Big 12 Conference's television partners. On the radio, women's basketball games aired on KTXX-HD4 "105.3 The Bat", with select games on KTXX-FM 104.9.

== See also ==
- 2018–19 Texas Longhorns men's basketball team
