= 2018–19 Iowa State Cyclones women's basketball team =

Intercollegiate basketball season

2018–19 Iowa State Cyclones women's basketball

Preseason WNIT Champions

NCAA tournament, round of 32
- Conference: Big 12 Conference

Ranking
- Coaches: No. 17
- AP: No. 13-T
- Record: 26–9 (13–5 Big 12)
- Head coach: Bill Fennelly (24th season)
- Assistant coaches: Jodi Steyer; Latoja Schaben; Billy Fennelly
- Home arena: Hilton Coliseum

2018–19 Big 12 Conference women's basketball standings
	Conf.				Overall
Team	W		L	PCT	W		L	PCT
No. 1 Baylor †	18	–	0	1.000	37	–	1	.974
No. 13 Iowa State	13	–	5	.722	26	–	9	.743
No. 23 Texas	12	–	6	.667	23	–	10	.697
West Virginia	11	–	7	.611	22	–	11	.667
Kansas State	11	–	7	.611	21	–	12	.636
TCU	10	–	8	.556	24	–	11	.686
Oklahoma State	5	–	13	.278	14	–	16	.467
Oklahoma	4	–	14	.222	8	–	22	.267
Texas Tech	4	–	14	.222	14	–	17	.452
Kansas	2	–	16	.111	13	–	18	.419
† 2019 Big 12 Tournament winner Rankings from AP poll

The 2018–19 Iowa State Cyclones women's basketball team represented Iowa State University during the 2018–19 NCAA Division I women's basketball season. The Cyclones were coached by Bill Fennelly, who was in his 24th season at Iowa State. They played their home games at Hilton Coliseum in Ames, Iowa as members of the Big 12 Conference. They finished the season 26–9, 13–5 in Big 12 play to finish in second place. They advanced to the championship game of the Big 12 women's tournament, where they lost to Baylor. They received an at-large bid to the NCAA women's tournament, where they defeated New Mexico State in the first round before being upset by Missouri State in the second round.

== Previous season ==
The Cyclones finished the 2017–18 season 14–17, 7–11 in Big 12 play to finish in a tie for seventh place. They advanced to the quarterfinals of the Big 12 women's tournament, where they lost to Texas.

== Offseason ==
=== Departures ===
Name	Number	Pos.	Height	Year	Hometown	Reason for departure
Emily Durr	3	G	6'0"	Senior	Utica, NY	Graduated
Bride Kennedy-Hopoate	12	F	6'4"	Junior	Brisbane, Australia	Transferred to New Mexico
Claire Ricketts	30	F	6'3"	RS senior	Parker, TX	Graduated

=== 2018 team recruits ===
College recruiting
Name	Hometown	School	Height	Weight	Commit date
Morgan Kane; F	Riverton, UT	Riverton High School	6 ft 3 in (1.91 m)	N/A	
Morgan Kane; F	Recruit ratings: No ratings found				
Ashley Joens; G	Iowa City, IA	City High School	5 ft 9 in (1.75 m)	N/A	
Ashley Joens; G	Recruit ratings: No ratings found				
Maddie Frederick; G	Tipp City, OH	Tippecanoe High School	6 ft 0 in (1.83 m)	N/A	
Maddie Frederick; G	Recruit ratings: No ratings found				
Overall recruit ranking:
Note: In many cases, Scout, Rivals, 247Sports, On3, and ESPN may conflict in their listings of height and weight.; In these cases, the average was taken. ESPN grades are on a 100-point scale.; Sources: "2018 Team Ranking". Rivals.

== Roster ==
2018–19 Iowa State Cyclones women's basketball team
Players
Coaches

Pos.	#	Name	Height	Year	Previous school	Hometown
F	1	Madison Wise	6 ft 1 in (1.85 m)	So	Greenfield-Central	Greenfield, IN
G	4	Rae Johnson	5 ft 7 in (1.7 m)	So	St. Michael-Albertville	Albertville, MN
G	10	Nia Washington	5 ft 7 in (1.7 m)	Jr	Riverdale Baptist	Stafford, VA
G	11	Jade Washington	5 ft 8 in (1.73 m)	Jr	Kilgore College	Lancaster, TX
F	13	Adriana Camber	5 ft 10 in (1.78 m)	Jr	Katedralskolan	Lund, Sweden
F/C	14	Lauren Mills	6 ft 2 in (1.88 m)	RS Fr	Rosny College	Hobart, Australia
F	15	Inès Nezerwa	6 ft 3 in (1.91 m)	Sr	Jacksonville College	Bujumbura, Burundi
G	21	Bridget Carleton	6 ft 1 in (1.85 m)	Sr	John McGregor Secondary	Chatham, ON
G	23	Maddie Frederick	6 ft 0 in (1.83 m)	Fr	Tippecanoe	Tipp, OH
G	24	Ashley Joens	6 ft 0 in (1.83 m)	Fr	Iowa City	Iowa City, IA
C	25	Kristan Scott	6 ft 3 in (1.91 m)	So	Kasson-Mantorville	Kasson, MN
F	31	Morgan Kane	6 ft 3 in (1.91 m)	Fr	Riverton	West Jordan, UT
F	32	Meredith Burkhall	6 ft 3 in (1.91 m)	Sr	Roosevelt	Urbandale, IA
G	33	Alexa Middleton	5 ft 9 in (1.75 m)	RS Sr	Riverdale HS; Tennessee	Murfreesboro, TN

Head coach

- Bill Fennelly (William Penn)

Assistant coach(es)

- Jodi Steyer (Colorado State)
- Latoja Schaben (Toledo)
- Billy Fennelly (Iowa State)

Legend

- (C) Team captain
- (S) Suspended
- (I) Ineligible
- (W) Walk-on
- Injured
- Current redshirt

Roster

== Schedule and results ==
Date time, TV	Rank^{#}	Opponent^{#}	Result	Record	High points	High rebounds	High assists	Site (attendance) city, state
Exhibition
Nov 1, 2018*; 6:30 pm		Southwest Baptist	W 90–51		17 – Carleton	10 – Scott	6 – Carleton	Hilton Coliseum (9,156); Ames, IA
Nov 4, 2018*; 2:00 pm, Cyclones.tv		Winona State	W 73–39		14 – Wise	8 – Tied	5 – Middleton	Hilton Coliseum (9,259); Ames, IA
Non-conference regular season
Nov 9, 2018*; 12:00 pm, Cyclones.tv		Niagara; Preseason WNIT First Round	W 95–35	1–0	16 – Jones	15 – Carleton	7 – Carleton	Hilton Coliseum (9,293); Ames, IA
Nov 11, 2018*; 2:00 pm, Cyclones.tv		Northern Illinois; Preseason WNIT Quarterfinals	W 70–60	2–0	21 – Carleton	13 – Carleton	7 – Johnson	Hilton Coliseum (9,266); Ames, IA
Nov 13, 2018*; 6:30 pm, Cyclones.tv		Auburn; Preseason WNIT Semifinals	W 67–64	3–0	18 – Joens	13 – Carleton	8 – Carleton	Hilton Coliseum (9,274); Ames, IA
Nov 18, 2018*; 3:30 pm, CBSSN		No. 24 Miami (FL); Preseason WNIT Championship Game	W 75–52	4–0	15 – Tied	8 – Scott	3 – Tied	Hilton Coliseum (10,064); Ames, IA
Nov 21, 2018*; 5:00 pm		vs. Eastern Michigan; Carleton's Homecoming	W 85–59	5–0	17 – Carleton	11 – Scott	3 – Tied	Thames Campus Arena (1,021); Chatham, ON
Nov 28, 2018*; 7:00 pm	No. 23	at South Dakota	L 59–64	5–1	19 – Wise	6 – Scott	3 – Middleton	Sanford Coyote Sports Center (2,364); Vermillion, SD
Dec 2, 2018*; 2:00 pm, Cyclones.tv	No. 23	Arkansas; Big 12/SEC Women's Challenge	W 91–82	6–1	24 – Carleton	11 – Carleton	8 – Middleton	Hilton Coliseum (10,097); Ames, IA
Dec 5, 2018*; 7:00 pm		at No. 16 Iowa; Iowa Corn Cy-Hawk Series	L 70–73	6–2	21 – Carleton	8 – Scott	4 – Middleton	Carver–Hawkeye Arena (6,289); Iowa City, IA
Dec 9, 2018*; 12:00 pm, Cyclones.tv		North Dakota	W 87–35	7–2	18 – Carleton	8 – Scott	4 – Washington	Hilton Coliseum (9,701); Ames, IA
Dec 16, 2018*; 12:00 pm, Cyclones.tv		Drake	W 86–81	8–2	31 – Carleton	8 – Carleton	4 – 2 tied	Hilton Coliseum (10,923); Ames, IA
Dec 19, 2018*; 6:30 pm, Cyclones.tv		Prairie View A&M	W 94–46	9–2	22 – Jones	8 – 2 tied	5 – Carleton	Hilton Coliseum (9,175); Ames, IA
Dec 29, 2018*; 1:00 pm, Cyclones.tv		Bucknell	W 86–61	10–2	21 – Carleton	8 – 2 tied	5 – Middleton	Hilton Coliseum (10,261); Ames, IA
Big 12 Conference season
Jan 2, 2019; 6:30 pm, Cyclones.tv	No. 25	Kansas State	W 96–58	11–2 (1–0)	26 – Carleton	10 – Scott	7 – 2 tied	Hilton Coliseum (9,582); Ames, IA
Jan 5, 2019; 1:00 pm, FSN	No. 25	at Kansas	W 82–73	12–2 (2–0)	33 – Carleton	6 – 2 tied	7 – Middleton	Allen Fieldhouse (2,790); Lawrence, KS
Jan 9, 2019; 6:30 pm, Cyclones.tv	No. 20	TCU	W 92–54	13–2 (3–0)	24 – Carleton	10 – Carleton	7 – Carleton	Hilton Coliseum (9,369); Ames, IA
Jan 12, 2019; 4:00 pm, Cyclones.tv	No. 20	No. 11 Texas	L 62–64	13–3 (3–1)	20 – Carleton	9 – Carleton	3 – Carleton	Hilton Coliseum (10,983); Ames, IA
Jan 16, 2019; 6:00 pm	No. 18	at West Virginia	L 64–73	13–4 (3–2)	26 – Carleton	10 – Carleton	4 – 2 tied	WVU Coliseum (1,512); Morgantown, WV
Jan 19, 2019; 12:00 pm, Cyclones.tv	No. 18	Oklahoma	W 104–78	14–4 (4–2)	25 – Joens	10 – Burkhall	5 – Middleton	Hilton Coliseum (9,758); Ames, IA
Jan 23, 2019; 7:00 pm, FSSW	No. 20	at No. 2 Baylor	L 69–84	14–5 (4–3)	28 – Carleton	8 – Scott	5 – Middleton	Ferrell Center (5,285); Waco, TX
Jan 26, 2019; 5:00 pm	No. 20	at Oklahoma State	W 84–71	15–5 (5–3)	31 – Scott	12 – Scott	11 – Middleton	Gallagher-Iba Arena (1,897); Stillwater, OK
Jan 29, 2019; 6:30 pm, Cyclones.tv	No. 23	Texas Tech	W 105–66	16–3 (6–3)	27 – Carleton	7 – Carleton	9 – Middleton	Hilton Coliseum (9,394); Ames, IA
Feb 2, 2019; 1:00 pm, ESPN3	No. 23	at Kansas State	W 81–52	17–5 (7–3)	19 – Carleton	12 – Scott	7 – Middleton	Bramlage Coliseum (3,668); Manhattan, KS
Feb 9, 2019; 6:00 pm, Cyclones.tv	No. 23	West Virginia	W 77–61	18–5 (8–3)	29 – Scott	12 – Carleton	7 – Carleton	Hilton Coliseum (10,408); Ames, IA
Feb 13, 2019; 6:30 pm	No. 18	at TCU	L 69–76	18–6 (8–4)	34 – Carleton	10 – Carleton	4 – Middleton	Schollmaier Arena (2,556); Fort Worth, TX
Feb 16, 2019; 1:00 pm, Cyclones.tv	No. 18	Oklahoma State	W 89–67	19–6 (9–4)	24 – Carleton	12 – Scott	4 – Middleton	Hilton Coliseum (10,386); Ames, IA
Feb 20, 2019; 10:30 am, FSSW	No. 20	at Oklahoma	W 91–70	20–6 (10–4)	28 – Carleton	10 – Carleton	9 – Middleton	Lloyd Noble Center; Norman, OK
Feb 23, 2019; 3:00 pm, FSN	No. 20	No. 1 Baylor	L 60–73	20–7 (10–5)	28 – Carleton	8 – Carleton	5 – Middleton	Hilton Coliseum (11,143); Ames, IA
Feb 26, 2019; 6:00 pm, FSSW	No. 20	at Texas Tech	W 64–62	21–7 (11–5)	27 – Carleton	11 – Carleton	4 – Carleton	United Supermarkets Arena (2,928); Lubbock, TX
Mar 2, 2019; 7:00 pm, LHN	No. 20	at No. 18 Texas	W 82–73	22–7 (12–5)	23 – Carleton	12 – Carleton	7 – Carleton	Frank Erwin Center (4,052); Austin, TX
Mar 4, 2019; 6:30 pm, Cyclones.tv	No. 19	Kansas	W 69–49	23–7 (13–5)	20 – Carleton	14 – Scott	4 – Middleton	Hilton Coliseum (10,073); Ames, IA
Big 12 Tournament
Mar 9, 2019; 6:00 pm, FSN	(2) No. 19	vs. (10) Kansas; Quarterfinals	W 75–58	24–7	18 – Carleton	10 – Wise	8 – Middleton	Chesapeake Energy Arena; Oklahoma City, OK
Mar 9, 2019; 4:30 pm, FS1	(2) No. 19	vs. (3) No. 21 Texas; Semifinals	W 75–69	25–7	24 – Middleton	12 – Joens	5 – Carleton	Chesapeake Energy Arena; Oklahoma City, OK
Mar 10, 2019; 8:00 pm, FS1	(2) No. 13	vs. (1) No. 1 Baylor; Championship Game	L 49–67	25–8	18 – Middleton	8 – Carleton	3 – Middleton	Chesapeake Energy Arena (3,272); Oklahoma City, OK
NCAA Women's Tournament
Mar 23, 2019*; 5:00 pm, ESPN2	(3 C) No. 13	(14 C) New Mexico State; First Round	W 97–61	26–8	23 – Carleton	14 – Nezerwa	9 – Middleton	Hilton Coliseum (6,503); Ames, IA
Mar 25, 2019*; 8:00 pm, ESPN	(3 C) No. 13	(11 C) Missouri State; Second Round	L 60–69	26–9	31 – Carleton	10 – Carleton	5 – Middleton	Hilton Coliseum (5,809); Ames, IA
*Non-conference game. ^{#}Rankings from AP Poll. (#) Tournament seedings in parentheses. C=Chicago Region. All times are in Central Time.

== Rankings ==
Ranking movements Legend: ██ Increase in ranking ██ Decrease in ranking — = Not ranked RV = Received votes т = Tied with team above or below
	Week																			
Poll	Pre	1	2	3	4	5	6	7	8	9	10	11	12	13	14	15	16	17	18	Final
AP	—	—	RV	23	RV	RV	RV	RV	25	20	18	20	23	23	18	20	20	19	13-T	Not released
Coaches	—	—^	RV	22	RV	RV	RV	RV	RV	22	19	22	25	23	21	21	22	19	15	17

^Coaches' Poll did not release a second poll at the same time as the AP.

== See also ==
- 2018–19 Iowa State Cyclones men's basketball team
