= 2019 Big 12 Conference women's basketball tournament =

- Classification: Division I
- Season: 2018–19
- Teams: 10
- Site: Chesapeake Energy Arena; Oklahoma City, Oklahoma
- Champions: Baylor (10th title)
- Winning coach: Kim Mulkey (10th title)
- MVP: Kalani Brown (Baylor)
- Attendance: 16,823 (overall); 3,272 (championship)
- Television: FCS-Central, FSN, FS1

2018–19 Big 12 Conference women's basketball standings
	Conf.				Overall
Team	W		L	PCT	W		L	PCT
No. 1 Baylor †	18	–	0	1.000	37	–	1	.974
No. 13 Iowa State	13	–	5	.722	26	–	9	.743
No. 23 Texas	12	–	6	.667	23	–	10	.697
West Virginia	11	–	7	.611	22	–	11	.667
Kansas State	11	–	7	.611	21	–	12	.636
TCU	10	–	8	.556	24	–	11	.686
Oklahoma State	5	–	13	.278	14	–	16	.467
Oklahoma	4	–	14	.222	8	–	22	.267
Texas Tech	4	–	14	.222	14	–	17	.452
Kansas	2	–	16	.111	13	–	18	.419
† 2019 Big 12 Tournament winner Rankings from AP poll

The 2019 Phillips 66 Big 12 Conference women's basketball tournament was the postseason tournament for the Big 12 Conference held from March 8 to 11 in Oklahoma City at Chesapeake Energy Arena. Baylor won the championship game over Iowa State, 57–49. Kalani Brown was named the tournament's Most Outstanding Player.

== Seeds ==
2019 Big 12 Conference women's basketball tournament seeds
Seed	School	Conf.	Over.	Tiebreaker
1	‡ - Baylor	18–0	28–1	
2	# - Iowa State	13–5	23–7	
3	# - Texas	12–6	22–8	
4	# - West Virginia	11–7	20–9	1–1 vs. Iowa State
5	# - Kansas State	11–7	20–10	0–2 vs. Iowa State
6	# - TCU	10–8	20–9	
7	Oklahoma State	5–13	14–15	
8	Oklahoma	4–14	8–21	1–1 vs. West Virginia
9	Texas Tech	4–14	13–16	0–2 vs. West Virginia
10	Kansas	2–16	12–17	
‡ – Big 12 Conference regular season champions, and tournament No. 1 seed. # - Received a single-bye in the conference tournament. Overall records include all games played in the Big 12 Conference tournament.

== Schedule ==
Session	Game	Time	Matchup	Television	Attendance
First round – Friday, March 8
1	1	6:00 pm	#9 Texas Tech 104 vs #8 Oklahoma 84	FCS-Central	3,204
1	2	8:30 pm	#10 Kansas 76 vs #7 Oklahoma State 66	FCS-Central	3,204
Quarterfinals – Saturday, March 9
2	3	11:00 am	#5 Kansas State 72 vs #4 West Virginia 59	FSN	3,353
2	4	1:30 pm	#1 Baylor 100 vs #9 Texas Tech 61	FSN	3,353
3	5	6:00 pm	#2 Iowa State 75 vs #10 Kansas 58	FSN	3,240
3	6	8:30 pm	#3 Texas 66 vs #6 TCU 64	FSN	3,240
Semifinals – Sunday, March 10
4	7	2:00 pm	#1 Baylor 88 vs #5 Kansas State 60	FS1	3,754
4	8	4:30 pm	#2 Iowa State 75 vs #3 Texas 69	FS1	3,754
Final – Monday, March 11
5	9	8:00 pm	#1 Baylor 67 vs #2 Iowa State 49	FS1	3,272
Game times in CT. #-Rankings denote tournament seed

== Bracket ==
- All times are Central

First round Friday, March 8
8	Oklahoma	84
9	Texas Tech	104
7	Oklahoma State	66
10	Kansas	76

Quarterfinals; Saturday, March 9
1	Baylor	100
9	Texas Tech	61
4	West Virginia	59
5	Kansas State	72
2	Iowa State	75
10	Kansas	58
3	Texas	66
6	TCU	64

Semifinals; Sunday, March 10
1	Baylor	88
5	Kansas State	60
2	Iowa State	75
3	Texas	69

Championship game Monday, March 11
1	Baylor	67
2	Iowa State	49

== All-Tournament team ==
Most Outstanding Player – Kalani Brown, Baylor

Player	Team
Kalani Brown	Baylor
Lauren Cox	Baylor
Bridget Carleton	Iowa State
Alexa Middleton	Iowa State
Sug Sutton	Texas

== See also ==
- 2019 Big 12 Conference men's basketball tournament
- 2019 NCAA Women's Division I Basketball Tournament
- 2018–19 NCAA Division I women's basketball rankings
