= 2018–19 NCAA Division I women's basketball rankings =

- Season: 2018–19
- NCAA Tournament: 2019
- Preseason No. 1: Notre Dame
- NCAA Tournament Champions: Baylor
NCAA Division I women's basketball rankings


Two human polls make up the 2018–19 NCAA Division I women's basketball rankings, the AP Poll and the Coaches Poll, in addition to various publications' preseason polls.

== Legend ==
	Increase in ranking
	Decrease in ranking
	Not ranked previous week
Italics	Number of first place votes
(#–#)	Win–loss record
т	Tied with team above or below also with this symbol

== AP Poll ==
	Preseason Oct. 31	Week 2 Nov. 12	Week 3 Nov. 19	Week 4 Nov. 26	Week 5 Dec. 3	Week 6 Dec. 10	Week 7 Dec. 17	Week 8 Dec. 24	Week 9 Dec. 31	Week 10 Jan. 7	Week 11 Jan. 14	Week 12 Jan. 21	Week 13 Jan. 28	Week 14 Feb. 4	Week 15 Feb. 11	Week 16 Feb. 18	Week 17 Feb. 25	Week 18 Mar. 4	Week 19 Mar. 11	Week 20 Mar. 18	
1.	Notre Dame (31)	Notre Dame (1–0) (30)	Notre Dame (3–0) (31)	Notre Dame (6–0) (31)	Connecticut (7–0) (31)	Connecticut (9–0) (31)	Connecticut (9–0) (31)	Connecticut (11–0) (31)	Connecticut (11–0) (31)	Notre Dame (14–1) (12)	Notre Dame (16–1) (23)	Notre Dame (18–1) (22)	Baylor (17–1) (24)	Baylor (19–1) (25)	Baylor (21–1) (22)	Baylor (23–1) (26)	Baylor (25–1) (28)	Baylor (27–1) (28)	Baylor (30–1) (28)	Baylor (31–1) (28)	1.
2.	Connecticut	Connecticut (1–0)	Connecticut (2–0)	Connecticut (5–0)	Notre Dame (7–1)	Notre Dame (8–1)	Notre Dame (9–1)	Notre Dame (11–1)	Notre Dame (12–1)	Louisville (14–0) (10)	Baylor (13–1) (6)т	Baylor (15–1) (7)	Connecticut (18–1) (2)	Louisville (21–1) (3)	Louisville (23–1) (3)	Oregon (24–1) (2)	Connecticut (25–2)	Connecticut (27–2)	Connecticut (30–2)	Connecticut (31–2)	2.
3.	Oregon	Oregon (2–0) (1)	Oregon (4–0)	Oregon (6–0)	Oregon (7–0)	Baylor (7–0)	Louisville (11–0)	Louisville (12–0)	Louisville (12–0)	Connecticut (12–1) (3)	Connecticut (14–1) (1)т	Connecticut (16–1) (1)	Louisville (19–1) (2)	Oregon (21–1)	Oregon (23–1) (3)	Connecticut (23–2)	Louisville (25–2)	Louisville (27–2)	Notre Dame (30–3)	Notre Dame (30–3)	3.
4.	Baylor	Baylor (3–0)	Baylor (4–0)	Baylor (6–0)	Baylor (7–0)	Louisville (10–0)	Mississippi State (10–0)	Maryland (11–0)	Maryland (12–0)	Baylor (11–1) (5)	Louisville (15–1)	Louisville (17–1)	Oregon (19–1)	Notre Dame (21–2)	Connecticut (21–2)	Louisville (23–2)	Notre Dame (25–3)	Notre Dame (27–3)	Mississippi State (30–2)	Mississippi State (30–2)	4.
5.	Louisville	Louisville (2–0)	Louisville (2–0)	Louisville (5–0)	Louisville (8–0)	Mississippi State (9–0)	Maryland (10–0)	Oregon (11–1)	Oregon (11–1)	Oregon (13–1)	Oregon (15–1)	Oregon (17–1)	Notre Dame (19–2)	Connecticut (19–2)	Mississippi State (22–1)	Notre Dame (23–3)	Mississippi State (25–2)	Mississippi State (27–2)	Louisville (29–3)	Louisville (29–3)	5.
6.	Mississippi State	Mississippi State (2–0)	Mississippi State (4–0)	Mississippi State (6–0)	Mississippi State (8–0)	Maryland (9–0)	Baylor (8–1)	Stanford (9–1)	Stanford (10–1)	Stanford (12–1)	Stanford (14–1)	Stanford (16–1)	Mississippi State (19–1)	Mississippi State (21–1)	Notre Dame (22–3)	Mississippi State (23–2)	Oregon (25–3)	Oregon (27–3)	Stanford (28–4)	Stanford (28–4)	6.
7.	Stanford	Stanford (2–0)	Maryland (4–0)	Maryland (6–0)	Maryland (8–0)	Oregon (7–1)	Oregon (8–1)	Baylor (8–1)	Mississippi State (12–1)	Mississippi State (14–1)	Mississippi State (15–1)	Mississippi State (17–1)	NC State (20–0)	Oregon State (19–3)	Maryland (22–2)	Stanford (21–4)	Stanford (23–4)	Stanford (25–4)	Oregon (29–4)	Oregon (29–4)	7.
8.	Oregon State	Oregon State (1–0)	Stanford (3–0)	Stanford (6–0)	Oregon State (6–1)	Oregon State (7–1)	Stanford (7–1)	Mississippi State (11–1)	Baylor (8–1)	NC State (15–0)	NC State (17–0)	NC State (18–0)	Stanford (17–2)	Marquette (19–3)	Marquette (21–3)	Maryland (23–3)	Maryland (24–3)	Maryland (26–3)	Iowa (26–6)	Iowa (26–6)	8.
9.	Maryland	Maryland (2–0)	Oregon State (3–0)	Oregon State (5–1)	Tennessee (6–0)	Tennessee (8–0)	Tennessee (8–0)	NC State (12–0)	NC State (13–0)	Maryland (13–1)	Maryland (15–1)	Oregon State (15–3)	Oregon State (17–3)	NC State (21–1)	Oregon State (20–4)	NC State (22–2)	Oregon State (23–5)	NC State (25–4)	Maryland (28–4)	Maryland (28–4)	9.
10.	South Carolina	South Carolina (1–0)	Texas (3–0)	Texas (6–0)	NC State (8–0)	NC State (10–0)	NC State (11–0)	Tennessee (9–1)	Tennessee (11–1)	Oregon State (12–2)	Oregon State (14–2)	Marquette (16–3)	Marquette (18–3)	Maryland (19–2)	Stanford (19–4)	Iowa (21–5)	NC State (24–3)	Iowa (23–6)	NC State (26–5)	NC State (26–5)	10.
11.	TennesseeT	Texas (1–0)	Tennessee (3–0)	Tennessee (5–0)	Stanford (6–1)	Stanford (6–1)	Oregon State (8–2)	Oregon State (9–2)	Oregon State (10–2)	Texas (12–2)	Texas (14–2)	Maryland (16–2)	Maryland (18–2)	Stanford (18–3)	South Carolina (17–5)	Marquette (22–4)	Kentucky (23–5)	Oregon State (24–6)	Oregon State (24–7)	Oregon State (24–7)	11.
12.	TexasT	Tennessee (1–0)	Iowa (4–0)	Syracuse (6–1)	Texas (7–1)	Texas (7–2)	Texas (8–2)	Minnesota (11–0)	Minnesota (12–0)	Syracuse (13–2)	Syracuse (14–2)	Texas (15–3)	Texas (17–3)	South Carolina (16–5)	NC State (21–2)	Oregon State (20–5)	Iowa (21–6)	South Carolina (21–8)	Gonzaga (27–3)	Syracuse (24–8)	12.
13.	Iowa	Iowa (2–0)	South Carolina (2–1)	NC State (6–0)	California (7–0)	California (8–0)	Minnesota (10–0)	Texas (9–2)	Texas (10–2)	Tennessee (12–2)	Gonzaga (16–1)	Syracuse (15–3)	Iowa (16–4)	Gonzaga (21–2)	Gonzaga (22–2)	South Carolina (19–6)	Marquette (23–5)	Kentucky (24–6)	Iowa State (25–7) T	Iowa State (25–8)	13.
14.	Georgia	Georgia (2–0)	Syracuse (3–1)	Iowa (4–1)	Minnesota (7–0)	Minnesota (9–0) T	California (9–0)	California (9–1)	Syracuse (11–2)	Gonzaga (15–1)	Marquette (14–3)	Rutgers (15–3)	Utah (18–1)	Texas (18–4)	Iowa (19–5)	Miami (FL) (22–5)	South Carolina (20–7)	Gonzaga (27–3)	Marquette (25–6) T	Texas A&M (24–7)	14.
15.	DePaul	DePaul (1–0)	NC State (4–0)	California (6–0)	Syracuse (7–2)	Syracuse (8–2)	Syracuse (9–2)	Syracuse (11–2)	Michigan State (11–1)	Marquette (12–3)	South Carolina (12–4)	Kentucky (16–3)	Gonzaga (19–2)	Syracuse (17–4)	Texas (19–5)	Gonzaga (23–3)	Miami (FL) (23–6)	Texas A&M (23–6)	Syracuse (24–8)	South Carolina (21–9)	15.
16.	Missouri	Missouri (1–0)	DePaul (1–1)	DePaul (3–2)	Iowa (5–2)	Iowa (7–2)	Iowa (9–2)	Iowa (9–2)	Kentucky (13–1)	Kentucky (14–2)	Kentucky (15–3)	Arizona State (13–5)	South Carolina (13–5)	Iowa (17–5)	Syracuse (18–5)	Kentucky (21–5)	Gonzaga (25–3)	Miami (FL) (24–7)	South Carolina (21–9)	Gonzaga (28–4)	16.
17.	NC State	NC State (2–0)	South Florida (4–0)	Texas A&M (4–1)	Arizona State (5–2)	Arizona State (7–2)	Arizona State (8–2)	Arizona State (9–2)	Gonzaga (12–1)	Iowa (10–3)	Michigan State (12–3)	Iowa (14–4)	Rutgers (16–4)	Utah (18–3)	Kentucky (19–5)	Arizona State (18–6)	Syracuse (20–6)	Marquette (24–6)	Texas A&M (24–7)	Kentucky (24–7)	17.
18.	Syracuse	Syracuse (1–1)	California (4–0)	South Carolina (3–3)	Marquette (6–1)	Kentucky (9–1)	Kentucky (10–1)	Kentucky (12–1)	California (9–2)	Minnesota (12–2)	Iowa State (13–3)	Gonzaga (17–2)	Syracuse (16–4)	Texas A&M (18–4)	Iowa State (18–5)	Syracuse (19–6)	Texas (21–6)	Syracuse (22–7)	Kentucky (24–7)	Marquette (26–7)	18.
19.	Marquette	Marquette (3–0)	Arizona State (2–1)	Arizona State (3–2)	Kentucky (8–0)	Marquette (7–2)	Marquette (9–2)	DePaul (9–3)	Iowa (9–3)	Arizona State (11–3)	Arizona State (12–4)	South Carolina (12–5)	Kentucky (17–4)	Kentucky (18–5)	Arizona State (16–6)	Texas (20–6)	Texas A&M (20–6)	Iowa State (22–7)	Miami (FL) (24–8)	Miami (FL) (24–8)	19.
20.	Texas A&M	Texas A&M (2–0)	Texas A&M (2–1)	Minnesota (5–0)	DePaul (4–3)	DePaul (7–3)	DePaul (8–3)	Gonzaga (11–1)	Marquette (10–3)	Iowa State (12–2)	Rutgers (13–3)т	Iowa State (14–4)	Texas A&M (16–4)	Rutgers (17–5)т	Miami (FL) (21–5)	Iowa State (19–6)	Iowa State (20–7)	Arizona State (19–9)	UCLA (20–12)	UCLA (20–12)	20.
21.	Duke	South Florida (2–0)	Missouri (3–1)	Miami (FL) (6–1)	Drake (7–1)	Gonzaga (9–1)	Gonzaga (10–1)	Michigan State (10–1)	Texas A&M (11–2)	South Carolina (10–4)	Tennessee (12–4)т	Utah (16–1)	Arizona State (14–6)	Arizona State (17–5)т	Florida State (20–4)	Texas A&M (19–6)	Arizona State (18–8)	Texas (21–8)	Drake (25–5)	Rice (28–3)	21.
22.	South Florida	Arizona State (1–1)	Marquette (3–1)	Marquette (4–1)	South Carolina (4–4)	Missouri (8–2)	Michigan State (9–1)	Marquette (9–3)	Arizona State (9–3)	Florida State (14–1)	Iowa (11–4)	Florida State (16–2)	Michigan State (15–5)	Iowa State (17–5)	Texas A&M (18–5)	Florida State (21–5)	Florida State (21–6)	Florida State (22–7) T	Texas (23–9)	Arizona State (20–10)	22.
23.	Arizona State	California (2–0)	Minnesota (3–0)	Iowa State (5–0)	Missouri (6–2)	Michigan State (8–1)	Texas A&M (8–2)	Texas A&M (10–2)	South Carolina (8–4)	Michigan State (11–3)	Minnesota (12–3)	Michigan State (13–5)	Iowa State (15–5)	Michigan State (16–5)	Rutgers (17–6)	South Dakota (23–3)	Drake (21–5)	Drake (23–5) T	Arizona State (20–10)	Texas (23–9)	23.
24.	California	Miami (FL) (3–0)	Miami (FL) (4–1)	Drake (6–1)	Gonzaga (8–1)	Miami (FL) (8–2)	Miami (FL) (9–2)	Miami (FL) (11–2)	DePaul (9–4)	California (10–3)	DePaul (12–5)	Texas A&M (14–4)	Florida State (17–3)	Florida State (19–3)	Michigan State (16–6)	Drake (19–5)	Rice (23–3)	Rice (24–3)	Rice (25–3)	DePaul (26–7)	24.
25.	Miami (FL)	Minnesota (1–0)	West Virginia (3–0)	Kentucky (7–0)	Miami (FL) (7–2)	South Carolina (5–4)	South Carolina (6–4)	South Carolina (7–4)	Iowa State (10–2)	Indiana (14–1)	Indiana (15–2)	Missouri (15–4)	BYU (17–3)	Miami (FL) (19–5)	South Dakota (22–3)	Rice (22–3)	UCLA (17–11)	UCLA (19–11)	Florida State (23–8)	Florida State (23–8)	25.
	Preseason Oct. 31	Week 2 Nov. 12	Week 3 Nov. 19	Week 4 Nov. 26	Week 5 Dec. 3	Week 6 Dec. 10	Week 7 Dec. 17	Week 8 Dec. 24	Week 9 Dec. 31	Week 10 Jan. 7	Week 11 Jan. 14	Week 12 Jan. 21	Week 13 Jan. 28	Week 14 Feb. 4	Week 15 Feb. 11	Week 16 Feb. 18	Week 17 Feb. 25	Week 18 Mar. 4	Week 19 Mar. 11	Week 20 Mar. 18	
		Dropped: No. 21 Duke	Dropped: No. 14 Georgia	Dropped: No. 17 South Florida; No. 21 Missouri; No. 25 West Virginia	Dropped: No. 17 Texas A&M; No. 23 Iowa State	Dropped: No. 21 Drake	Dropped: No. 22 Missouri	None	Dropped: No. 24 Miami (FL)	Dropped: No. 21 Texas A&M; No. 24 DePaul	Dropped: No. 22 Florida State; No. 24 California	Dropped: No. 20 Tennessee; No. 23 Minnesota; No. 24 DePaul; No. 25 Indiana	Dropped: No. 25 Missouri	Dropped: No. 25 BYU	Dropped: No. 17 Utah	Dropped: No. 23 Rutgers; No. 24 Michigan State	Dropped: No. 23 South Dakota	None	None	Dropped: No. 21 Drake	

== USA Today Coaches Poll ==
The Coaches Poll is the second oldest poll still in use after the AP Poll. It is compiled by a rotating group of 31 college Division I head coaches. The Poll operates by Borda count. Each voting member ranks teams from 1 to 25. Each team then receives points for their ranking in reverse order: Number 1 earns 25 points, number 2 earns 24 points, and so forth. The points are then combined and the team with the highest points is then ranked No. 1; second highest is ranked No. 2 and so forth. Only the top 25 teams with points are ranked, with teams receiving first place votes noted the quantity next to their name. The maximum points a single team can earn is 775.

	Preseason Nov 1	Week 2 Nov 20	Week 3 Nov 27	Week 4 Dec 4	Week 5 Dec 11	Week 6 Dec 18	Week 7 Dec 24	Week 8 Dec 31	Week 9 Jan 8	Week 10 Jan 15	Week 11 Jan 22	Week 12 Jan 29	Week 13 Feb 5	Week 14 Feb 12	Week 15 Feb 19	Week 16 Feb 26	Week 17 Mar 5	Week 18 Mar 12	Week 19 Mar 18	Final Apr 8	
1.	Notre Dame (30)	Notre Dame (3–0)	Notre Dame (6–0) (32)	Connecticut (7–0) (32)	Connecticut (9–0) (32)	Connecticut (9–0) (32)	Connecticut (11–0) (31)	Connecticut (11–0) (31)	Notre Dame (14–1) (15)	Notre Dame (16–1) (26)	Notre Dame (18–1)	Baylor (17–1) (19)	Baylor (20–1) (27)	Baylor (21–1) (27)	Baylor (23–1) (32)	Baylor (26–1) (31)	Baylor (28–1) (31)	Baylor (31–1) (32)	Baylor (31–1) (32)	Baylor (37–1) (32)	1.
2.	Connecticut (2)	Connecticut (2–0)	Connecticut (5–0)	Notre Dame (7–1)	Notre Dame (8–1)	Notre Dame (9–1)	Notre Dame (11–1)	Notre Dame (12–1)	Louisville (14–0) (9)	Connecticut (14–1) (6)	Connecticut (16–1)	Connecticut (18–1) (11)	Louisville (21–1) (3)	Louisville (23–1) (2)	Connecticut (23–2)	Connecticut (25–2)	Connecticut (28–2)	Connecticut (31–2)	Connecticut (31–2)	Notre Dame (35–4)	2.
3.	Oregon	Oregon (4–0)	Oregon (6–0)	Oregon (7–0)	Louisville (10–0)	Louisville (11–0)	Louisville (12–0)	Louisville (12–0)	Connecticut (12–1) (6)	Baylor (13–1) (2)	Baylor (15–1)	Louisville (19–1)	Oregon (21–1) (1)	Oregon (23–1) (3)	Oregon (24–2)	Louisville (25–2)	Louisville (27–2)	Notre Dame (30–3)	Notre Dame (30–3)	Connecticut (35–3)	3.
4.	Louisville	Louisville (3–0)	Louisville (6–0)	Louisville (8–0)	Baylor (7–0)	Mississippi State (10–0)	Maryland (11–0)	Maryland (12–0)	Baylor (11–1) (2)	Louisville (15–1)	Louisville (17–1)	Oregon (19–1) (1)	Notre Dame (21–2) (1)	Connecticut (22–2)	Louisville (23–2)т	Notre Dame (26–3)	Notre Dame (27–3)	Mississippi State (30–2)	Mississippi State (30–2)	Oregon (33–5)	4.
5.	Baylor	Baylor (4–0)	Baylor (6–0)	Baylor (7–0)	Mississippi State (9–0)	Maryland (10–0)	Oregon (11–1)	Oregon (11–1)	Oregon (13–1)	Oregon (15–1)	Oregon (17–1)	Notre Dame (19–2) (1)	Connecticut (19–2)	Mississippi State (22–1)	Notre Dame (24–3)т	Mississippi State (25–2)	Mississippi State (27–2)	Louisville (29–3)	Louisville (29–3)	Mississippi State (33–3)	5.
6.	Mississippi State	Mississippi State (4–0)	Mississippi State (6–0)	Mississippi State (8–0)	Maryland (10–0)	Baylor (8–1)	Baylor (8–1)	Mississippi State (12–1)	Mississippi State (14–1)	Mississippi State (16–1)	Mississippi State (17–1)	Mississippi State (19–1)	Mississippi State (21–1)	Notre Dame (22–3)	Mississippi State (23–2)	Oregon (25–3)	Oregon (27–3)	Stanford (28–4)	Stanford (28–4)	Louisville (32–4)	6.
7.	Stanford	Stanford (3–0)	Stanford (6–0)	Maryland (8–0)	Oregon (7–1)	Oregon (8–1)	Mississippi State (11–1)	Baylor (8–1)	Stanford (12–1)	Stanford (14–1)	Stanford (16–1)	NC State (20–0)	Marquette (19–3)	Marquette (21–3)	Stanford (21–4)	Stanford (23–4)	Stanford (25–4)	Oregon (29–4)	Oregon (29–4)	Stanford (31–5)	7.
8.	Texas	Oregon State (3–0)	Maryland (6–0)	Oregon State (6–1)	Oregon State (7–1)	Tennessee (8–0)	Stanford (9–1)	Stanford (10–1)	NC State (15–0)	NC State (17–0)	NC State (18–0)	Stanford (17–2)	Maryland (20–2)	Maryland (22–2)	Oregon State (21–5)	Oregon State (23–5)	Maryland (26–3)	Iowa (26–6)	Iowa (26–6)	Iowa (29–7)	8.
9.	Oregon State	Texas (3–0)	Oregon State (5–1)	Tennessee (6–0)	Tennessee (8–0)	Stanford (7–1)	NC State (12–0)	NC State (13–0)	Maryland (13–1)	Maryland (15–1)	Marquette (16–3)	Marquette (18–3)	NC State (21–1)	Oregon State (20–4)	Maryland (23–3)	Maryland (25–3)	Oregon State (24–6)	Maryland (28–4)	Maryland (28–4)	NC State (28–6)	9.
10.	Maryland	Maryland (4–0)	Texas (6–0)	NC State (8–0)	NC State (10–0)	NC State (11–0)	Tennessee (9–1)	Tennessee (11–1)	Oregon State (12–2)	Oregon State (14–2)	Maryland (16–2)	Maryland (18–2)	Oregon State (19–3)	Stanford (19–4)	Iowa (21–5)	NC State (24–3)	Iowa (23–6)	NC State (26–5)	NC State (26–5)	Oregon State (26–8)	10.
11.	South Carolina	Tennessee (3–0)	Tennessee (5–0)	Stanford (6–1)	Stanford (6–1)	Oregon State (8–2)	Oregon State (9–2)	Oregon State (10–2)	Texas (12–2)	Texas (14–2)	Oregon State (15–3)	Oregon State (17–3)	Stanford (18–3)	NC State (21–2)	Marquette (22–4)	Iowa (22–6)	NC State (25–4)	Gonzaga (28–3)	Oregon State (24–7)	Maryland (29–5)	11.
12.	Tennessee	South Carolina (2–1)	Syracuse (6–1)	Texas (7–1)	Texas (7–2)	Texas (8–2)	Texas (9–2)	Texas (10–2)	Syracuse (13–2)	Syracuse (14–2)	Kentucky (16–3)	Iowa (16–4)	Gonzaga (21–2)	Gonzaga (22–2)	NC State (22–3)	Marquette (23–5)	Gonzaga (27–3)	Oregon State (24–7)	Syracuse (24–8)	Texas A&M (26–8)	12.
13.	Georgia	NC State (4–0)	NC State (6–0)	California (7–0)	California (8–0)	California (9–0)	California (9–1)	Minnesota (12–0)	Tennessee (12–2)	Marquette (14–3)	Texas (15–3)	Gonzaga (19–2)	South Carolina (16–5)	Iowa (19–5)	South Carolina (19–6)	Kentucky (23–5)	South Carolina (21–8)	Marquette (26–6)	Iowa State (25–8)	South Carolina (23–10)	13.
14.	Missouri	Iowa (4–0)	DePaul (4–2)	Syracuse (7–2)	Syracuse (8–2)	Syracuse (9–2)	Syracuse (11–2)	Syracuse (11–2)	Marquette (12–3)	Gonzaga (16–1)	Syracuse (15–3)	Texas (17–4)	Syracuse (17–4)	South Carolina (17–6)	Miami (FL) (22–5)	Gonzaga (25–3)	Kentucky (24–6)	Syracuse (24–8)	Gonzaga (28–4)	UCLA (22–13)	14.
15.	DePaul	Syracuse (3–1)	Iowa (4–1)	Marquette (6–1)	Iowa (7–2)	Iowa (8–2)	Minnesota (11–0)	Kentucky (13–1)	Gonzaga (15–1)	Kentucky (15–3)	Iowa (14–4)	Kentucky (17–4)	Texas (18–5)	Texas (19–5)	Arizona State (18–6)	South Carolina (20–7)т	Miami (FL) (24–7)	Iowa State (25–8)	Miami (FL) (24–8)	Arizona State (22–11)	15.
16.	NC State	DePaul (1–1)	Texas A&M (4–1)	Iowa (5–2)	Marquette (7–2) т	Minnesota (10–0)	Iowa (9–2)	Marquette (10–3)	Kentucky (14–2)	Arizona State (12–4)	Arizona State (13–5)	Syracuse (16–4)	Iowa (17–5)	Syracuse (18–5)	Gonzaga (23–3)	Miami (FL) (23–6)т	Syracuse (22–7)	Miami (FL) (24–8)	Marquette (26–7)	Syracuse (25–9)	16.
17.	Iowa	South Florida (4–0)	Marquette (4–1)	DePaul (5–3)	Minnesota (9–0) т	Marquette (9–2)	Kentucky (12–1)	Michigan State (11–1)	Iowa (11–3)	Tennessee (12–4)	Gonzaga (17–2)	Utah (18–1)	Kentucky (18–5)	Arizona State (16–6)	Kentucky (21–5)	Syracuse (20–7)	Marquette (24–6)	Kentucky (24–7)	Kentucky (24–7)	Iowa State (26–9)	17.
18.	Syracuse	Missouri (3–1)	California (6–0)	Minnesota (7–0)	DePaul (7–3)	Kentucky (10–1) т	Arizona State (9–2)	Gonzaga (12–1)	Florida State (14–1)	Iowa (12–4)	Rutgers (15–3)	South Carolina (14–5)	Arizona State (15–6)	Kentucky (20–5)	Syracuse (19–6)	Texas A&M (21–6)	Texas A&M (23–6)	South Carolina (21–9)	South Carolina (21–9)	Gonzaga (29–5)	18.
19.	Marquette	Marquette (3–1)	South Carolina (3–3)	Kentucky (8–0) т	Arizona State (7–2)	DePaul (8–3) т	Marquette (9–3)	California (9–2)	Arizona State (11–3)	Iowa State (13–3)	Florida State (16–2)	Rutgers (16–4)	Florida State (19–3)	Florida State (20–4)	Texas (20–6)	Texas (21–7)	Iowa State (23–7)	Texas A&M (24–7)	Texas A&M (24–7)	Marquette (27–8)	19.
20.	Duke	West Virginia (3–0) т	Miami (FL) (6–1)	Arizona State (5–2) т	Kentucky (9–1)	Arizona State (8–2)	DePaul (9–3)	Iowa (9–3)	Minnesota (12–2)	South Carolina (12–4)	South Carolina (13–5)	Arizona State (14–6)	Utah (18–3)	Miami (FL) (21–5)	Florida State (21–5)	Arizona State (18–8)	Arizona State (19–9)	Arizona State (20–10)	Arizona State (20–10)	Miami (FL) (25–9)	20.
21.	South Florida т	Texas A&M (2–1) т	West Virginia (4–1)	Drake (7–1)	Gonzaga (9–1)	Gonzaga (10–1)	Gonzaga (11–1)	Texas A&M (11–2)	California (10–3)	Florida State (14–2)	Michigan State (13–5)	Florida State (17–3)	Michigan State (16–5)	Iowa State (18–5)	Iowa State (19–6)	Florida State (21–6)	Florida State (22–7)	Drake (25–5)	DePaul (26–7)	Kentucky (25–8)	21.
22.	Texas A&M т	Miami (FL) (4–1)	Iowa State (5–0)	Gonzaga (8–1)	Miami (FL) (8–2) т	Michigan State (9–1)	Michigan State (10–1)	Arizona State (9–3)	Iowa State (12–2)	Michigan State (12–4)	Iowa State (14–4)	Michigan State (15–5)	Texas A&M (18–4)	Michigan State (17–6)	Texas A&M (19–6)	Iowa State (20–7)	Texas (21–8)	Florida State (23–8)	Florida State (23–8)	South Dakota State (28–7)	22.
23.	UCLA	California (4–0)	Arizona State (3–2)	Miami (FL) (7–2)	Michigan State (8–1) т	Miami (FL) (9–2)	Miami (FL) (11–2)	Florida State (12–1)	Miami (FL) (14–3)	Rutgers (13–3)	Miami (FL) (16–4)	Miami (FL) (18–4)	Iowa State (17–5)	Texas A&M (18–5)	South Dakota (23–3)	Drake (21–5)	Drake (23–5)	DePaul (25–7)	Rice (28–3)	Florida State (24–9)	23.
24.	Miami (FL)	Georgia (2–2)	Drake (6–1)	South Carolina (4–4)	Missouri (8–2)	Texas A&M (8–2)	Texas A&M (10–2)	DePaul (9–4)	Michigan State (11–3)	DePaul (12–5)	Utah (16–1)	Texas A&M (16–4)	Rutgers (17–5)	Rutgers (17–6)	Drake (19–5)	DePaul (21–7)	DePaul (23–7)	Texas (23–9)	UCLA (20–12)	Missouri State (25–10)	24.
25.	West Virginia	Arizona State (2–1)	Kentucky (7–0)	Missouri (6–2)	Drake (8–2)	USC (9–0)	Florida State (11–1)	Virginia Tech (13–0)	South Carolina (10–4)	Minnesota (12–4)	Texas A&M (14–4)	Iowa State (15–5)	Miami (FL) (19–5)	South Dakota (22–3)	Missouri (19–8)	South Dakota (24–4)	South Dakota (26–4)	South Dakota (28–4)	Drake (27–6)	DePaul (26–8)	25.
	Preseason Nov 1	Week 2 Nov 20	Week 3 Nov 27	Week 4 Dec 4	Week 5 Dec 11	Week 6 Dec 18	Week 7 Dec 24	Week 8 Dec 31	Week 9 Jan 8	Week 10 Jan 15	Week 11 Jan 22	Week 12 Jan 29	Week 13 Feb 5	Week 14 Feb 12	Week 15 Feb 19	Week 16 Feb 26	Week 17 Mar 5	Week 18 Mar 12	Week 19 Mar 18	Final Apr 8	
		Dropped: No. 20 Duke; No. 23 UCLA	Dropped: No. 17 South Florida; No. 18 Missouri; No. 24 Georgia	Dropped: No. 16 Texas A&M; No. 21 West Virginia; No. 22 Iowa State	Dropped: No. 24 South Carolina	Dropped: No. 24 Missouri	Dropped: No. 25 USC	Dropped: No. 23 Miami (FL)	Dropped: No. 21 Texas A&M; No. 24 DePaul; No. 25 Virginia Tech	Dropped: No. 21 California; No. 23 Miami (FL)	Dropped: No. 17 Tennessee; No. 24 DePaul; No. 25 Minnesota	Dropped: None	Dropped: None	Dropped: No. 20 Utah	Dropped: No. 22 Michigan State; No. 24 Rutgers	Dropped: No. 25 Missouri	None	None	Dropped: No. 24 Texas; No. 25 South Dakota	Dropped: No. 23 Rice; No 25 Drake	

== See also ==
2018–19 NCAA Division I men's basketball rankings
