= 2019 NCAA Women's Basketball All-Americans =

An All-American team is an honorary sports team composed of the best amateur players of a specific season for each team position—who in turn are given the honorific "All-America" and typically referred to as "All-American athletes", or simply "All-Americans". Although the honorees generally do not compete together as a unit, the term is used in U.S. team sports to refer to players who are selected by members of the national media. Walter Camp selected the first All-America team in the early days of American football in 1889. The 2019 NCAA Women's Basketball All-Americans are honorary lists that will include All-American selections from the Associated Press (AP), the United States Basketball Writers Association (USBWA), and the Women's Basketball Coaches Association (WBCA) for the 2018–19 NCAA Division I women's basketball season. Both AP and USBWA choose three teams, while WBCA lists 10 honorees.

A consensus All-America team in women's basketball has never been organized. This differs from the practice in men's basketball, in which the NCAA uses a combination of selections by AP, USBWA, the National Association of Basketball Coaches (NABC), and the Sporting News to determine a consensus All-America team. The selection of a consensus All-America men's basketball team is possible because all four organizations select at least a first and second team, with only the USBWA not selecting a third team.

Before the 2017–18 season, it was impossible for a consensus women's All-America team to be determined because the AP had been the only body that divided its women's selections into separate teams. The USBWA first named separate teams in 2017–18. The women's counterpart to the NABC, the Women's Basketball Coaches Association (WBCA), continues the USBWA's former practice of selecting a single 10-member (plus ties) team. The Sporting News does not select an All-America team in women's basketball.

== By selector ==
=== Associated Press (AP) ===
First team		Second team		Third team	
Player	School	Player	School	Player	School
Napheesa Collier	UConn	Arike Ogunbowale	Notre Dame	Katie Lou Samuelson	UConn
Megan Gustafson	Iowa	Kalani Brown	Baylor	Jessica Shepard	Notre Dame
Sabrina Ionescu	Oregon	Kristine Anigwe	UC Berkeley	Lauren Cox	Baylor
Asia Durr	Louisville	Alanna Smith	Stanford	Sophie Cunningham	Missouri
Teaira McCowan	Mississippi State	Bridget Carleton	Iowa State	Jackie Young	Notre Dame

==== AP Honorable Mention ====
- Bella Alarie, Princeton
- Chastadie Barrs, Lamar
- Kenisha Bell, Minnesota
- Chennedy Carter, Texas A&M
- Kaila Charles, Maryland
- Crystal Dangerfield, UConn
- Cierra Dillard, Buffalo
- Reyna Frost, Central Michigan
- Ae’rianna Harris, Purdue
- Ruthy Hebard, Oregon
- Natisha Hiedeman, Marquette
- Jazzmun Holmes, Mississippi State
- Anriel Howard, Mississippi State
- Kiara Leslie, N.C. State
- Tiana Mangakahia, Syracuse
- Aari McDonald, Arizona
- Beatrice Mompremier, Miami
- Destiny Slocum, Oregon State

=== United States Basketball Writers Association (USBWA) ===
First team		Second team		Third team	
Player	School	Player	School	Player	School
Napheesa Collier	UConn	Kristine Anigwe	UC Berkeley	Bridget Carleton	Iowa State
Megan Gustafson	Iowa	Kalani Brown	Baylor	Kaila Charles	Maryland
Sabrina Ionescu	Oregon	Chennedy Carter	Texas A&M	Lauren Cox	Baylor
Teaira McCowan	Mississippi State	Asia Durr	Louisville	Sophie Cunningham	Missouri
Arike Ogunbowale	Notre Dame	Katie Lou Samuelson	UConn	Alana Smith	Stanford

=== Women's Basketball Coaches Association (WBCA) ===
Player	School
Kalani Brown	Baylor
Bridget Carleton	Iowa State
Napheesa Collier	UConn
Asia Durr	Louisville
Megan Gustafson	Iowa
Sabrina Ionescu	Oregon
Teaira McCowan	Mississippi State
Arike Ogunbowale	Notre Dame
Katie Lou Samuelson	UConn
Alanna Smith	Stanford

== By player ==
Player	School	Year	AP	USBWA	WBCA	Notes
Napheesa Collier	UConn	Sr	1	1	1	20.9 ppg, 10.5 rpg, 3.5 apg, 61.4 FG%
Megan Gustafson	Iowa	Sr	1	1	1	28.0 ppg, 13.3 rpg, 1.8 blocks, 69.6 FG%
Sabrina Ionescu	Oregon	Jr	1	1	1	19.6 ppg, 7.5 rpg, 8.1 apg, 42.3 3P%
Asia Durr	Louisville	Sr	1	2	1	21.3 ppg, 3.5 rpg, 3.2 apg, 1.6 steals
Teaira McCowan	Mississippi State	Sr	1	1	1	17.8 ppg, 13.5 rpg, 2.4 blocks, 65.5 FG%
Arike Ogunbowale	Notre Dame	Sr	2	1	1	21.0 ppg, 4.9 rpg, 3.9 apg, 1.9 steals
Kalani Brown	Baylor	Sr	2	2	1	15.7 ppg, 8.0 rpg, 1.5 blocks, 62.3 FG%
Kristine Anigwe	UC Berkeley	Sr	2	2	–	22.9 ppg, 16.3 rpg, 1.8 blocks, 51.9 FG%
Alanna Smith	Stanford	Sr	2	3	1	19.6 ppg, 8.6 rpg, 2.4 blocks
Bridget Carleton	Iowa State	Sr	2	3	1	21.4 ppg, 8.6 rpg, 4.1 apg, 84.8 FT%
Katie Lou Samuelson	UConn	Sr	3	2	1	18.9 ppg, 6.7 rpg, 88.1 FT%
Jessica Shepard	Notre Dame	Sr	3	–	–	16.5 ppg, 9.9 rpg, 60.8 FG%
Lauren Cox	Baylor	Jr	3	3	–	12.6 ppg, 8.2 rpg, 2.5 blocks, 50.5 FG%
Sophie Cunningham	Missouri	Sr	3	3	–	18.0 ppg, 6.1 rpg, 2.8 apg
Jackie Young	Notre Dame	Sr	3	–	–	14.8 ppg, 7.3 rpg, 5.3 apg, 55.4 FG%
Chennedy Carter	Texas A&M	So	–	2	–	23.3 ppg, 4.8 rpg, 3.4 apg
Kaila Charles	Maryland	Jr	–	3	–	17.4 ppg, 6.9 rpg, 80.9 FT%

== Academic All-Americans ==
The College Sports Information Directors of America (CoSIDA) announced its 15-member 2019 Academic All-America team on March 11, 2019, divided into first, second and third teams with Mikayla Ferenz of Idaho chosen as women's college basketball Academic All-American of the Year.

When a player is listed with two grade-point averages, the first is her undergraduate GPA. Players listed with two majors separated by a slash are double majors unless explicitly designated as undergraduate and graduate programs.

First Team
Player	School	Class	GPA and major
Brittany Brewer	Texas Tech	Jr.	4.00, Community, Family & Addiction Sciences
Ciara Duffy (Note: Third-team selection in 2017–18.)	South Dakota	Sr.	4.00, Political Science
Mikayla Ferenz (Note: First-team selection in 2017–18.)	Idaho	Sr.	4.00, Mathematics
Sara Rhine	Drake	Sr.	4.00, Elementary Education
Amanda Thompson	Mercer	Sr.	3.98, Electrical Engineering

Second Team
Player	School	Class	GPA and major
Amanda Johnson	Houston Baptist	Sr.	4.00, Biology
Mikayla Pivec	Oregon State	Jr.	3.93, Bio-health Sciences
Alanna Smith	Stanford	Sr.	3.47, Psychology
Clara Tapia	Wyoming	Sr.	4.00, Molecular Biology / Chemistry
Mikayla Voigt	Northern Illinois	Sr.	3.93, Nursing

Third Team
Player	School	Class	GPA and major
Mary Dunn	Youngstown State	Jr.	4.00, Communications / Sociology
Reyna Frost	Central Michigan	Sr.	3.68, Mathematics
Carmen Grande	Ohio	GS	3.95/3.92, Mathematical Science (UG) / Ind. & Sys. Engineering (G)
Becca Hittner	Drake	Jr.	3.96, Marketing
Taylor Stahly	Louisiana Tech	Sr.	4.00, Exercise & Health Promotion
