= 2018–19 California Golden Bears women's basketball team =

Intercollegiate basketball season

2018–19 California Golden Bears women's basketball

NCAA Women's Tournament, second round
- Conference: Pac-12 Conference
- Record: 20–13 (9–9 Pac-12)
- Head coach: Lindsay Gottlieb (8th season)
- Assistant coaches: Charmin Smith; Kai Felton; Wendale Farrow
- Home arena: Haas Pavilion

2018–19 Pac-12 Conference women's basketball standings
	Conf.				Overall
Team	W		L	PCT	W		L	PCT
No. 7 Oregon	16	–	2	.889	33	–	5	.868
No. 6 Stanford †	15	–	3	.833	31	–	5	.861
No. 11 Oregon State	14	–	4	.778	26	–	8	.765
No. 20 UCLA	12	–	6	.667	22	–	13	.629
No. 22 Arizona State	10	–	7	.588	22	–	11	.667
Utah	9	–	9	.500	20	–	10	.667
California	9	–	9	.500	20	–	13	.606
Arizona	7	–	11	.389	24	–	13	.649
USC	7	–	11	.389	17	–	13	.567
Washington State	4	–	14	.222	9	–	21	.300
Washington	2	–	15	.118	11	–	21	.344
Colorado	2	–	16	.111	12	–	18	.400
† 2019 Pac-12 Tournament winner Rankings from AP Poll

The 2018–19 California Golden Bears women's basketball team represented University of California, Berkeley during the 2018–19 NCAA Division I women's basketball season. The Golden Bears, led by eighth year head coach Lindsay Gottlieb, played their home games at the Haas Pavilion as members of the Pac-12 Conference. They finished the season 20–13, 9–9 in Pac-12 play to finish in a tie for sixth place. They advanced to the quarterfinals of the Pac-12 women's tournament where they lost to Stanford. They received an at-large bid to the NCAA women's tournament where they defeated North Carolina in the first round before losing to Baylor in the second round.

== Roster ==
2018–19 California Golden Bears women's basketball team
Players
Coaches

Pos.	#	Name	Height	Year	Previous school	Hometown
G	0	McKenzie Forbes	6 ft 0 in (1.83 m)	Fr	Folsom	Oakland, CA
G	1	Asha Thomas	5 ft 4 in (1.63 m)	Sr	Bishop O'Dowd	Oakland, CA
F	4	Alaysia Styles	6 ft 3 in (1.91 m)	So	La Jolla Country Day School	San Diego, CA
C	5	Chen Yue	6 ft 7 in (2.01 m)	RS Jr	Tsinghua University	Beijing, China
G	11	Sara Anastasieska	5 ft 11 in (1.8 m)	RS Jr	Monte Sant Angelo Mercy; UTSA	Sydney, Australia
G	14	Kianna Smith	6 ft 0 in (1.83 m)	So	Troy	Moreno Valley, CA
G	20	MeAne Mosley	5 ft 11 in (1.8 m)	Sr	Saint Mary's College	Oakland, CA
G	21	Mi'Cole Cayton	5 ft 9 in (1.75 m)	RS So	Saint Mary's College	Stockton, CA
G	22	Archer Olson	6 ft 0 in (1.83 m)	So	Henry M. Gunn	Palo Alto, CA
G	24	Receé Caldwell	5 ft 9 in (1.75 m)	RS Sr	Homeschooled; Texas Tech	Hemet, CA
F	30	Celeste West	6 ft 4 in (1.93 m)	Jr	Garces Memorial	Bakersfield, CA
F/C	31	Kristine Anigwe	6 ft 4 in (1.93 m)	Sr	Desert Vista	Phoenix, AZ
G	33	Jaelyn Brown	6 ft 1 in (1.85 m)	Jr	Vista Murrieta	Murrieta, CA
G	34	Sierra Richey	5 ft 10 in (1.78 m)	Fr	Rancho Campana	Camarillo, CA

Head coach

- Lindsay Gottlieb (Brown)

Assistant coach(es)

- Charmin Smith (Stanford)
- Kai Felton (Randolph–Macon)
- Wendale Farrow (Eastern Michigan)

Legend

- (C) Team captain
- (S) Suspended
- (I) Ineligible
- (W) Walk-on
- Injured
- Current redshirt

Roster

== Schedule ==
Date time, TV	Rank^{#}	Opponent^{#}	Result	Record	Site (attendance) city, state
Exhibition
11/01/2018*; 7:00 pm	No. 24	Westmont	W 79–62		Haas Pavilion (987); Berkeley, CA
Non-conference regular season
11/06/2018*; 7:00 pm	No. 24	Houston	W 80–79	1–0	Haas Pavilion (1,246); Berkeley, CA
11/11/2018*; 11:00 am	No. 24	at Penn State	W 75–58	2–0	Bryce Jordan Center (2,406); University Park, PA
11/13/2018*; 3:00 pm, TheW.tv	No. 23	at BYU	W 70–52	3–0	Marriott Center (425); Provo, UT
11/18/2018*; 2:00 pm	No. 23	Pacific	W 81–69	4–0	Maples Pavilion (502); Stanford, CA
11/23/2018*; 4:00 pm	No. 18	vs. Tulane; USD Thanksgiving Tournament	W 65–57	5–0	Jenny Craig Pavilion (421); San Diego, CA
11/24/2018*; 4:00 pm	No. 18	at San Diego; USD Thanksgiving Tournament	W 70–53	6–0	Jenny Craig Pavilion; San Diego, CA
12/02/2018*; 2:00 pm	No. 15	Cal State Northridge	W 67–42	7–0	Haas Pavilion (1,654); Berkeley, CA
12/08/2018*; 2:00 pm, TheW.tv	No. 13	at Saint Mary's	W 81–78 ^{OT}	8–0	McKeon Pavilion (763); Moraga, CA
12/16/2018*; 2:00 pm	No. 13	UC Santa Barbara	W 69–45	9–0	Haas Pavilion; Berkeley, CA
12/22/2018*; 12:00 pm, P12N	No. 14	No. 1 Connecticut	L 66–76	9–1	Haas Pavilion (10,818); Berkeley, CA
12/30/2018*; 2:00 pm	No. 14	Harvard	L 79–85	9–2	Haas Pavilion (2,319); Berkeley, CA
Pac-12 regular season
01/04/2019; 7:00 pm, P12N	No. 18	UCLA	L 79–84 ^{OT}	9–3 (0–1)	Haas Pavilion (2,107); Berkeley, CA
01/06/2019; 3:00 pm, P12N	No. 18	USC	W 66–59	10–3 (1–1)	Haas Pavilion (2,212); Berkeley, CA
01/11/2019; 6:00 pm, P12N	No. 24	at Arizona	L 55–60	10–4 (1–2)	McKale Center (2,557); Tucson, AZ
01/13/2019; 4:00 pm, P12N	No. 24	at No. 19 Arizona State	L 61–62	10–5 (1–3)	Wells Fargo Arena (2,348); Tempe, AZ
01/18/2019; 11:30 am		Washington State	W 77–63	11–5 (2–3)	Haas Pavilion (4,836); Berkeley, CA
01/20/2019; 2:00 pm, P12N		Washington	W 79–70	12–5 (3–3)	Haas Pavilion (2,095); Berkeley, CA
01/25/2019; 6:00 pm, P12N		at No. 21 Utah	L 74–87	12–6 (3–4)	Jon M. Huntsman Center (4,071); Salt Lake City, UT
01/27/2019; 12:00 pm, P12N		at Colorado	W 80–60	13–6 (4–4)	CU Events Center (2,303); Boulder, CO
01/31/2019; 8:00 pm, P12N		No. 8 Stanford	W 81–80	14–6 (5–4)	Haas Pavilion (3,117); Berkeley, CA
02/02/2019; 4:00 pm, P12N		at No. 8 Stanford	L 50–75	14–7 (5–5)	Maples Pavilion (4,066); Stanford, CA
02/08/2019; 8:00 pm, P12N		No. 3 Oregon	L 82–105	14–8 (5–6)	Haas Pavilion (2,719); Berkeley, CA
02/10/2019; 1:00 pm, P12N		No. 7 Oregon State	L 74–82	14–9 (5–7)	Haas Pavilion (3,220); Berkeley, CA
02/15/2019; 8:00 pm, P12N		at USC	L 76–86	14–10 (5–8)	Galen Center (412); Los Angeles, CA
02/17/2019; 4:00 pm, P12N		at UCLA	L 74–80	14–11 (5–9)	Pauley Pavilion (2,721); Los Angeles, CA
02/22/2019; 7:00 pm, P12N		No. 17 Arizona State	W 69–60	15–11 (6–9)	Haas Pavilion (1,667); Berkeley, CA
02/24/2019; 2:00 pm		Arizona	W 82–76 ^{OT}	16–11 (7–9)	Haas Pavilion (2,432); Berkeley, CA
03/01/2019; 7:00 pm		at Washington	W 71–65	17–11 (8–9)	Alaska Airlines Arena (2,333); Seattle, WA
03/03/2019; 12:00 pm, P12N		at Washington State	W 80–58	18–11 (9–9)	Beasley Coliseum (713); Pullman, WA
Pac-12 Women's Tournament
03/07/2019; 6:00 pm, P12N	(7)	vs. (10) Washington State; First Round	W 77–58	19–11	MGM Grand Garden Arena; Paradise, NV
03/08/2019; 6:00 pm, P12N	(7)	vs. (2) No. 7 Stanford; Quarterfinals	L 54–72	19–12	MGM Grand Garden Arena; Paradise, NV
NCAA Women's Tournament
03/23/2019*; 12:30 pm, ESPN2	(8 C)	vs. (9 C) North Carolina; First Round	W 92–72	20–12	Ferrell Center; Waco, TX
03/25/2019*; 6:00 pm, ESPN	(8 C)	at (1 C) No. 1 Baylor; Second Round	L 63–102	20–13	Ferrell Center (5,367); Waco, TX
*Non-conference game. ^{#}Rankings from AP Poll. (#) Tournament seedings in parentheses. C=Chicago Region. All times are in Pacific Time.

== Rankings ==
Ranking movement Legend: ██ Increase in ranking. ██ Decrease in ranking. NR = Not ranked. RV = Received votes.
Poll	Pre	Wk 2	Wk 3	Wk 4	Wk 5	Wk 6	Wk 7	Wk 8	Wk 9	Wk 10	Wk 11	Wk 12	Wk 13	Wk 14	Wk 15	Wk 16	Wk 17	Wk 18	Wk 19	Final
AP	24	23	18	15	13	13-T	14	14	18	24	RV	RV	RV	RV						N/A
Coaches	RV	RV^	23	18	13	13	13	13	19	21	RV	RV	RV	RV	RV					

^Coaches did not release a Week 2 poll.

== See also ==
- 2018–19 California Golden Bears men's basketball team
