= 2018–19 Colorado Buffaloes women's basketball team =

Intercollegiate basketball season

2018–19 Colorado Buffaloes women's basketball
- Conference: Pac-12 Conference
- Record: 12–18 (2–16 Pac-12)
- Head coach: JR Payne (3rd season)
- Assistant coaches: Toriano Towns; Alex Earl; Shandrika Lee
- Home arena: CU Events Center

2018–19 Pac-12 Conference women's basketball standings
	Conf.				Overall
Team	W		L	PCT	W		L	PCT
No. 7 Oregon	16	–	2	.889	33	–	5	.868
No. 6 Stanford †	15	–	3	.833	31	–	5	.861
No. 11 Oregon State	14	–	4	.778	26	–	8	.765
No. 20 UCLA	12	–	6	.667	22	–	13	.629
No. 22 Arizona State	10	–	7	.588	22	–	11	.667
Utah	9	–	9	.500	20	–	10	.667
California	9	–	9	.500	20	–	13	.606
Arizona	7	–	11	.389	24	–	13	.649
USC	7	–	11	.389	17	–	13	.567
Washington State	4	–	14	.222	9	–	21	.300
Washington	2	–	15	.118	11	–	21	.344
Colorado	2	–	16	.111	12	–	18	.400
† 2019 Pac-12 Tournament winner Rankings from AP Poll

The 2018–19 Colorado Buffaloes women's basketball team represented the University of Colorado Boulder during the 2018–19 NCAA Division I women's basketball season. The Buffaloes, led by third year head coach JR Payne, played their home games at the CU Events Center and were a member of the Pac-12 Conference. They finished the season 12–18, 2–16 in Pac-12 play to finish in last place. They lost in the first round of the Pac-12 women's tournament to Arizona State.

JR Payne's 2018–19 Colorado team started the Pac-12 conference season 0–11, the worst start to conference competition in program history, before finally winning its first conference game against USC on February 10, 2019. The previous worst conference start in program history was 9 losses to start conference play. Linda Lappe's 2015–16 Colorado team is the only other Colorado team to ever start 0–9 in conference. Lappe was fired at the end of that season.

== Roster ==
2018–19 Colorado Buffaloes women's basketball team
Players
Coaches

Pos.	#	Name	Height	Year	Previous school	Hometown
G	0	Quinessa Caylao-Do	5 ft 8 in (1.73 m)	Jr	Bellevue	Tacoma, WA
G	1	Cameron Swartz	5 ft 11 in (1.8 m)	Fr	Fellowship Christian	Marietta, GA
G	2	Alexis Robinson	5 ft 10 in (1.78 m)	Sr	Paul G. Blazer	Ashland, KY
G	3	Emma Clarke	6 ft 1 in (1.85 m)	Fr	Australian Institute of Sport	Perth, Western Australia
G	4	Lesila Finau	5 ft 10 in (1.78 m)	Fr	Dublin	Dublin, CA
G	12	Peyton Carter	5 ft 8 in (1.73 m)	So	Monarch	Louisville, CO
G	14	Kennedy Leonard	5 ft 8 in (1.73 m)	Sr	Carroll	Southlake, TX
G/F	21	Mya Hollingshed	6 ft 4 in (1.93 m)	RS So	Bellaire	Houston, TX
G	23	Mathilde Diop	6 ft 2 in (1.88 m)	Jr	Lycee Gambetta; Arizona Western College	Dakar, Senegal
G	24	Aubrey Knight	6 ft 1 in (1.85 m)	So	Ventura	Ventura, CA
F	25	Annika Jank	6 ft 3 in (1.91 m)	So	Edina	Edina, MN
C	30	Kai Volcy	6 ft 4 in (1.93 m)	Fr	The Hun School	Bloomfield, NJ
F	33	Sirena Tuitele	6 ft 1 in (1.85 m)	Fr	Pleasant Valley	Chico, CA

Head coach

- JR Payne (Saint Mary's)

Assistant coach(es)

- Toriano Towns (Saint Mary's)
- Alex Earl (Arizona State)
- Shandrika Lee (Pepperdine)

Legend

- (C) Team captain
- (S) Suspended
- (I) Ineligible
- (W) Walk-on
- Injured
- Current redshirt

Roster

== Schedule ==
Date time, TV	Rank^{#}	Opponent^{#}	Result	Record	Site (attendance) city, state
Exhibition
10/29/2018*; 7:00 pm		Southern Nazarene	W 93–43		CU Events Center (388); Boulder, CO
Non-conference regular season
11/06/2018*; 7:00 pm		Northern Colorado	W 77–69	1–0	CU Events Center (1,384); Boulder, CO
11/14/2018*; 7:00 pm		Colorado State	W 59–40	2–0	CU Events Center (1,394); Boulder, CO
11/18/2018*; 1:00 pm		North Carolina	W 86–74	3–0	CU Events Center (1,739); Boulder, CO
11/23/2018*; 3:00 pm		at Nevada; Nugget Classic	W 65–52	4–0	Lawlor Events Center (1,070); Reno, NV
11/25/2018*; 12:00 pm		vs. Utah State; Nugget Classic	W 78–68	5–0	Lawlor Events Center (137); Reno, NV
11/27/2018*; 7:00 pm		Pepperdine	W 80–65	6–0	CU Events Center (1,319); Boulder, CO
12/02/2018*; 11:00 am		at Miami (FL)	L 58–73	6–1	Watsco Center (896); Coral Gables, FL
12/06/2018*; 7:00 pm		San Jose State	W 76–64	7–1	CU Events Center (1,238); Boulder, CO
12/09/2018*; 1:00 pm		Navy	W 59–43	8–1	CU Events Center (1,668); Boulder, CO
12/12/2018*; 7:00 pm		Prairie View A&M	W 79–38	9–1	CU Events Center (1,302); Boulder, CO
12/20/2018*; 7:00 pm		Samford	W 81–39	10–1	CU Events Center (1,530); Boulder, CO
Pac-12 regular season
12/30/2018; 1:00 pm, P12N		Utah	L 61–76	10–2 (0–1)	CU Events Center (2,277); Boulder, CO
01/04/2019; 7:00 pm		Arizona	L 67–69	10–3 (0–2)	CU Events Center (1,673); Boulder, CO
01/06/2019; 2:00 pm, P12N		No. 22 Arizona State	L 70–76	10–4 (0–3)	CU Events Center (2,024); Boulder, CO
01/11/2019; 7:00 pm, P12N		at Washington	L 58–68	10–5 (0–4)	Alaska Airlines Arena (1,634); Seattle, WA
01/13/2019; 1:00 pm, P12N		at Washington State	L 48–74	10–6 (0–5)	Beasley Coliseum (647); Pullman, WA
01/18/2019; 7:00 pm, P12N		at Utah	L 59–78	10–7 (0–6)	Jon M. Huntsman Center (3,045); Salt Lake City, UT
01/25/2019; 7:00 pm, P12N		No. 6 Stanford	L 69–80	10–8 (0–7)	CU Events Center (2,373); Boulder, CO
01/27/2019; 1:00 pm, P12N		California	L 60–80	10–9 (0–8)	CU Events Center (2,303); Boulder, CO
02/01/2019; 8:00 pm, P12N		at No. 9 Oregon State	L 65–89	10–10 (0–9)	Gill Coliseum (4,600); Corvallis, OR
02/03/2019; 1:00 pm		at No. 4 Oregon	L 43–102	10–11 (0–10)	Matthew Knight Arena (6,350); Eugene, OR
02/08/2019; 7:00 pm, P12N		UCLA	L 60–64	10–12 (0–11)	CU Events Center (2,261); Boulder, CO
02/10/2019; 1:00 pm, P12N		USC	W 81–76	11–12 (1–11)	CU Events Center (2,215); Boulder, CO
02/15/2019; 7:00 pm		at No. 19 Arizona State	L 49–66	11–13 (1–12)	Wells Fargo Arena (2,554); Tempe, AZ
02/17/2019; 12:00 pm, P12N		at Arizona	L 51–63	11–14 (1–13)	McKale Center (2,321); Tucson, AZ
02/22/2019; 7:00 pm		Washington State	W 72–61	12–14 (2–13)	CU Events Center (1,925); Boulder, CO
02/24/2019; 1:00 pm		Washington	L 46–60	12–15 (2–14)	CU Events Center (3,698); Boulder, CO
03/01/2019; 8:00 pm, P12N		at USC	L 77–84	12–16 (2–15)	Galen Center (376); Los Angeles, CA
03/03/2019; 1:00 pm, P12N		at No. 25 UCLA	L 50–84	12–17 (2–16)	Pauley Pavilion (2,411); Los Angeles, CA
Pac-12 Women's Tournament
03/07/2019; 3:00 pm, P12N	(12)	vs. (5) No. 20 Arizona State; First Round	L 49–66	12–18	MGM Grand Garden Arena; Paradise, NV
*Non-conference game. ^{#}Rankings from AP Poll. (#) Tournament seedings in parentheses. All times are in Mountain Time.

== Rankings ==
2018–19 NCAA Division I women's basketball rankings

Regular season polls
Poll	Pre- season	Week 2	Week 3	Week 4	Week 5	Week 6	Week 7	Week 8	Week 9	Week 10	Week 11	Week 12	Week 13	Week 14	Week 15	Week 16	Week 17	Week 18	Week 19	Final
AP																				N/A
Coaches																				

Legend
	Increase in ranking
	Decrease in ranking
	No change
(RV)	Received votes
(NR)	Not ranked

== See also ==
2018–19 Colorado Buffaloes men's basketball team
