= 2018–19 Arizona Wildcats women's basketball team =

Intercollegiate basketball season

2018–19 Arizona Wildcats women's basketball

WNIT, Champions
- Conference: Pac-12 Conference
- Record: 24–13 (7–11 Pac-12)
- Head coach: Adia Barnes (3rd season)
- Assistant coaches: Salvo Coppa; Kelly Rae Finley; April Phillips
- Home arena: McKale Center

2018–19 Pac-12 Conference women's basketball standings
	Conf.				Overall
Team	W		L	PCT	W		L	PCT
No. 7 Oregon	16	–	2	.889	33	–	5	.868
No. 6 Stanford †	15	–	3	.833	31	–	5	.861
No. 11 Oregon State	14	–	4	.778	26	–	8	.765
No. 20 UCLA	12	–	6	.667	22	–	13	.629
No. 22 Arizona State	10	–	7	.588	22	–	11	.667
Utah	9	–	9	.500	20	–	10	.667
California	9	–	9	.500	20	–	13	.606
Arizona	7	–	11	.389	24	–	13	.649
USC	7	–	11	.389	17	–	13	.567
Washington State	4	–	14	.222	9	–	21	.300
Washington	2	–	15	.118	11	–	21	.344
Colorado	2	–	16	.111	12	–	18	.400
† 2019 Pac-12 Tournament winner Rankings from AP Poll

The 2018–19 Arizona Wildcats women's basketball team represented University of Arizona during the 2018–19 NCAA Division I women's basketball season. The Wildcats, led by third-year head coach Adia Barnes, played their home games at the McKale Center and were members of the Pac-12 Conference. They finished the season of 24–13, 7–11 in Pac-12 play to finish in a tie for sixth place. They advanced to the quarterfinals of the Pac-12 women's tournament where they lost to Oregon. They received an at-large bid to the Women's National Invitation Tournament, where they advanced to the finals and defeated Northwestern for the championship.

== Previous season ==
They finished the season 6–24, 2–16 in Pac-12 play to finish in eleventh place. They lost in the first round of the Pac-12 women's basketball tournament to Arizona State.

== Off-season ==
=== Departures ===
Name	Pos.	Height	Year	Hometown	Reason for departure
Kat Wright	F	6'0"	RS Senior	Woodland Hills, CA	Graduated
JaLea Bennett	F	6'0"	Senior	Grand Prairie, TX	Graduated
Sammy Fatkin	G	6'0"	Freshman	Snohomish, WA	Elected to transfer to Montana

=== Incoming transfers ===
Name	Pos.	Height	Year	Hometown	Notes

=== Recruits ===
College recruiting information
Name	Hometown	School	Height	Weight	Commit date
Cate Reese; F	Cypress, TX	Cypress Woods HS	6 ft 2 in (1.88 m)	N/A	
Cate Reese; F	Recruit ratings: Scout: Rivals: 247Sports: ESPN: (98)				
Semaj Smith; PG	Long Beach, CA	St. Anthony HS	6 ft 5 in (1.96 m)	N/A	
Semaj Smith; PG	Recruit ratings: Scout: Rivals: 247Sports: ESPN: (96)				
Valeria Trucco; F/C	Turin, Italy	Fixi Piramis Torino (ITA)	6 ft 3 in (1.91 m)	N/A	
Valeria Trucco; F/C	Recruit ratings: Scout: Rivals: 247Sports: ESPN: (90)				
Shalyse Smith; G/F	Tacoma, WA	Bellarmine Prep	6 ft 1 in (1.85 m)	N/A	
Shalyse Smith; G/F	Recruit ratings: Scout: Rivals: 247Sports: ESPN: (90)				
Bryce Nixon; PG	Phoenix, AZ	Arcadia HS	5 ft 10 in (1.78 m)	N/A	
Bryce Nixon; PG	Recruit ratings: Scout: Rivals: 247Sports: ESPN: (89)				
Overall recruit ranking:
Note: In many cases, Scout, Rivals, 247Sports, On3, and ESPN may conflict in their listings of height and weight.; In these cases, the average was taken. ESPN grades are on a 100-point scale.; Sources: "2018 Player Commits". ESPN. Archived from the original on June 29, 2016.

== Roster ==
2018–19 Arizona Wildcats women's basketball team
Players
Coaches

Pos.	#	Name	Height	Year	Previous school	Hometown
G	1	Shalyse Smith	6 ft 1 in (1.85 m)	Fr	Bellarmine Prep	Tacoma, WA
G	2	Aari McDonald	5 ft 7 in (1.7 m)	RS So	Brookside Christian HS/Washington	Fresno, CA
G	4	Lucia Alonso	5 ft 7 in (1.7 m)	Jr	Aron Leon Cuna Del Parlamentarismo	León, Spain
G	10	Tee Tee Starks	5 ft 9 in (1.75 m)	RS So	Hopkins HS/Iowa State	Brooklyn Park, MN
F	14	Sam Thomas	6 ft 0 in (1.83 m)	So	Centennial HS	Bloomfield Hills, MI
F	20	Dominique McBryde	6 ft 2 in (1.88 m)	RS Jr	Bedford North Lawrence HS/Purdue	Bedford, IN
F	21	Destiny Graham	6 ft 3 in (1.91 m)	Sr	Eastside College Prep	East Palo Alto, CA
G	22	Lindsey Malecha (W)	5 ft 9 in (1.75 m)	Sr	Hill-Murray HS	Mahtomedi, MN
G	24	Bryce Nixon	5 ft 10 in (1.78 m)	Fr	Arcadia HS	Phoenix, AZ
F	25	Cate Reese	6 ft 2 in (1.88 m)	Fr	Cypress HS	Cypress, TX
G	32	Kiana Barkhoff	6 ft 3 in (1.91 m)	So	Palm Harbor University HS	Kitzingen, Germany
C	34	Semaj Smith	6 ft 6 in (1.98 m)	Fr	St. Anthony HS	Long Beach, CA
F/C	—	Valeria Trucco	6 ft 2 in (1.88 m)	Fr	Fixi Piramis Torino (ITA)	Torino, ITL

Head coach

- Adia Barnes (Arizona)

Assistant coach(es)

- Salvo Coppa (IULM)
- Morgan Valley (Washington)
- April Phillips (Xavier)

Legend

- (C) Team captain
- (S) Suspended
- (I) Ineligible
- (W) Walk-on
- Injured
- Current redshirt

Roster

== Schedule ==
Date time, TV	Rank^{#}	Opponent^{#}	Result	Record	Site (attendance) city, state
Exhibition
10/29/2018*; 6:30 pm		Eastern New Mexico	W 88–31		McKale Center (1,303); Tucson, AZ
11/05/2018*; 6:30 pm		Western New Mexico	W 78–41		McKale Center (1,149); Tucson, AZ
Non-conference regular season
11/09/2018*; 6:30 pm		Idaho State	W 71–46	1–0	McKale Center (1,226); Tucson, AZ
11/13/2018*; 6:30 pm		Loyola Marymount	L 64–66	1–1	McKale Center (852); Tucson, AZ
11/16/2018*; 3:00 pm		vs. Seattle; Bank of Hawaii Classic	W 84–54	2–1	Stan Sheriff Center; Honolulu, HI
11/18/2018*; 3:00 pm		vs. Portland; Bank of Hawaii Classic	W 92–70	3–1	Stan Sheriff Center; Honolulu, HI
11/23/2018*; 6:30 pm		South Carolina State	W 73–32	4–1	McKale Center (1,247); Tucson, AZ
11/27/2018*; 6:30 pm		Incarnate Word	W 84–42	5–1	McKale Center (1,059); Tucson, AZ
12/02/2018*; 2:00 pm		at San Diego State	W 69–60	6–1	Viejas Arena (1,900); San Diego, CA
12/05/2018*; 11:00 am		Montana	W 100–51	7–1	McKale Center (4,703); Tucson, AZ
12/09/2018*; 3:00 pm		at Long Beach State	W 70–43	8–1	Walter Pyramid (616); Long Beach, CA
12/17/2018*; 6:30 pm		UTEP	W 62–40	9–1	McKale Center (1,076); Tucson, AZ
12/21/2018*; 6:30 pm		Northern Arizona	W 71–47	10–1	McKale Center (1,866); Tucson, AZ
Pac-12 regular season
12/30/2018; 5:00 pm, P12N		No. 17 Arizona State	W 51–39	11–1 (1–0)	McKale Center (5,006); Tucson, AZ
01/04/2019; 7:00 pm		at Colorado	W 69–67	12–1 (2–0)	CU Events Center (1,673); Boulder, CO
01/06/2019; 12:00 pm, P12N		at Utah	L 64–80	12–2 (2–1)	Jon M. Huntsman Center (2,089); Salt Lake City, UT
01/11/2019; 7:00 pm, P12N		No. 24 California	W 60–55	13–2 (3–1)	McKale Center (2,557); Tucson, AZ
01/13/2019; 12:00 pm, P12N		No. 6 Stanford	L 48–78	13–3 (3–2)	McKale Center (2,686); Tucson, AZ
01/18/2019; 8:00 pm		at No. 10 Oregon State	L 64–86	13–4 (3–3)	Gill Coliseum (5,061); Corvallis, OR
01/20/2019; 1:00 pm, P12N		at No. 5 Oregon	L 60–93	13–5 (3–4)	Matthew Knight Arena (7,062); Eugene, OR
01/25/2019; 7:00 pm, P12N		USC	W 71–68	14–5 (4–4)	McKale Center (1,684); Tucson, AZ
01/27/2019; 2:00 pm, P12N		UCLA	L 93–98 ^{3OT}	14–6 (4–5)	McKale Center (2,327); Tucson, AZ
02/01/2019; 6:00 pm, P12N		at No. 21 Arizona State	L 47–60	14–7 (4–6)	Wells Fargo Arena (3,686); Tempe, AZ
02/07/2019; 8:00 pm, P12N		at Washington	W 69–59	15–7 (5–6)	Alaska Airlines Arena (1,444); Seattle, WA
02/09/2019; 1:00 pm, P12N		at Washington State	L 88–90	15–8 (5–7)	Beasley Coliseum (711); Pullman, WA
02/15/2019; 6:00 pm		Utah	W 66–55	16–8 (6–7)	McKale Center (2,002); Tucson, AZ
02/17/2019; 12:00 pm, P12N		Colorado	W 63–51	17–8 (7–7)	McKale Center (2,321); Tucson, AZ
02/22/2019; 8:00 pm		at Stanford	L 54–56	17–9 (7–8)	Maples Pavilion (3,569); Stanford, CA
02/24/2019; 3:00 pm		at California	L 76–82 ^{OT}	17–10 (7–9)	Haas Pavilion (2,432); Berkeley, CA
03/01/2019; 8:00 pm, P12N		No. 6 Oregon	L 54–83	17–11 (7–10)	McKale Center (2,517); Tucson, AZ
03/03/2019; 3:00 pm, P12N		No. 9 Oregon State	L 60–65 ^{2OT}	17–12 (7–11)	McKale Center (2,119); Tucson, AZ
Pac-12 Women's Tournament
03/07/2019; 3:00 pm, P12N	(8)	vs. (9) USC; First Round	W 76–48	18–12	MGM Grand Garden Arena (3,012); Paradise, NV
03/08/2019; 3:00 pm, P12N	(8)	vs. (1) No. 6 Oregon; Quarterfinals	L 63–77	18–13	MGM Grand Garden Arena (4,531); Paradise, NV
WNIT
03/21/2019*; 6:30 pm		Idaho State; First Round	W 66–56	19–13	McKale Center (3,265); Tucson, AZ
03/24/2019*; 3:00 pm		Pacific; Second Round	W 64–48	20–13	McKale Center (3,534); Tucson, AZ
03/28/2019*; 6:30 pm		Idaho; Third Round	W 68–60	21–13	McKale Center (6,307); Tucson, AZ
03/31/2019*; 2:00 pm		Wyoming; Quarterfinals	W 67–45	22–13	McKale Center (7,717); Tucson, AZ
04/03/2019*; 6:00 pm		TCU; Semifinals	W 59–53	23–13	McKale Center (10,135); Tucson, AZ
04/06/2019*; 12:00 pm, CBSSN		Northwestern; Championship	W 56–42	24–13	McKale Center (14,644); Tucson, AZ
*Non-conference game. ^{#}Rankings from AP Poll. (#) Tournament seedings in parentheses. All times are in Mountain Time.

== Rankings ==
Ranking movement Legend: ██ Increase in ranking. ██ Decrease in ranking. NR = Not ranked. RV = Received votes.
Poll	Pre	Wk 2	Wk 3	Wk 4	Wk 5	Wk 6	Wk 7	Wk 8	Wk 9	Wk 10	Wk 11	Wk 12	Wk 13	Wk 14	Wk 15	Wk 16	Wk 17	Wk 18	Wk 19	Final
AP									RV		RV									N/A
Coaches									RV	RV	RV									RV

== See also ==
2018–19 Arizona Wildcats men's basketball team
