= 2018–19 USC Trojans women's basketball team =

Intercollegiate basketball season

2018–19 USC Trojans women's basketball
- Conference: Pac-12 Conference
- Record: 17–13 (7–11 Pac-12)
- Head coach: Mark Trakh (2nd consecutive, 7th overall season)
- Assistant coaches: Jason Glover; Aarika Hughes; Blanche Alverson
- Home arena: Galen Center

2018–19 Pac-12 Conference women's basketball standings
	Conf.				Overall
Team	W		L	PCT	W		L	PCT
No. 7 Oregon	16	–	2	.889	33	–	5	.868
No. 6 Stanford †	15	–	3	.833	31	–	5	.861
No. 11 Oregon State	14	–	4	.778	26	–	8	.765
No. 20 UCLA	12	–	6	.667	22	–	13	.629
No. 22 Arizona State	10	–	7	.588	22	–	11	.667
Utah	9	–	9	.500	20	–	10	.667
California	9	–	9	.500	20	–	13	.606
Arizona	7	–	11	.389	24	–	13	.649
USC	7	–	11	.389	17	–	13	.567
Washington State	4	–	14	.222	9	–	21	.300
Washington	2	–	15	.118	11	–	21	.344
Colorado	2	–	16	.111	12	–	18	.400
† 2019 Pac-12 Tournament winner Rankings from AP Poll

The 2018–19 USC Trojans women's basketball team represented the University of Southern California during the 2018–19 NCAA Division I women's basketball season. The Trojans, led head coach Mark Trakh in his second year at the helm, and seventh overall, played their home games at the Galen Center in Los Angeles, California and were members of the Pac-12 Conference. They finished the season 17–13, 7–11 in Pac-12 play, to finish in a tie for eighth place. The Trojans lost in the first round of the Pac-12 women's basketball tournament to Arizona.

== Roster ==
2018–19 USC Trojans women's basketball team
Players
Coaches

Pos.	#	Name	Height	Year	Previous school	Hometown
G	0	Shalexxus Aaron	6 ft 1 in (1.85 m)	RS Fr	Martin Luther King HS	Apple Valley, CA
F	1	Kayla Overbeck (redshirt)	6 ft 1 in (1.85 m)	Jr	Newbury Park; Vanderbilt	Newbury Park, CA
G	3	Minyon Moore	5 ft 8 in (1.73 m)	Jr	Salesian HS	Rodeo, CA
G	4	Mariya Moore	6 ft 0 in (1.83 m)	RS Sr	Salesian HS; Louisville	Hercules, CA
F	5	Ja'Tavia Tapley	6 ft 4 in (1.93 m)	Jr	University Christian	Jacksonville, FL
F	10	Cheyanne Wallace	6 ft 0 in (1.83 m)	Sr	Sierra Canyon; Loyola Marymount	Woodland Hills, CA
F	13	Marguerite Effa	6 ft 3 in (1.91 m)	Sr	Fairfax HS	Los Angeles, CA
F	14	Jillian Archer	6 ft 2 in (1.88 m)	Fr	Bishop Alemany HS	Santa Monica, CA
G	21	Aliyah Mazyck	5 ft 9 in (1.75 m)	Sr	Myers Park HS	Charlotte, NC
G	22	Kyerstin Galloway (W)	5 ft 5 in (1.65 m)	So	San Pedro HS	Los Angeles, CA
F	23	Asiah Jones	6 ft 3 in (1.91 m)	RS So	Woodmont HS	Piedmont, SC
G	24	Desiree Caldwell	5 ft 8 in (1.73 m)	Fr	Byron P. Steele II HS	Cibolo, TX
F	32	Dani Milisic	6 ft 3 in (1.91 m)	RS So	Blacktown Girls HS	Sydney, Australia

Head coach

- Mark Trakh (Long Beach State)

Assistant coach(es)

- Jason Glover (Grand Canyon)
- Aarika Hughes (USC)
- Blanche Alverson (Auburn)

Legend

- (C) Team captain
- (S) Suspended
- (I) Ineligible
- (W) Walk-on
- Injured
- Current redshirt

Roster

== Schedule ==
Date time, TV	Rank^{#}	Opponent^{#}	Result	Record	Site (attendance) city, state
Non-conference regular season
November 6, 2018*; 5:00 p.m.		UC Riverside	W 73–55	1–0	Galen Center (412); Los Angeles, CA
November 11, 2018*; 2:00 p.m.		at Long Beach State	W 86–50	2–0	Walter Pyramid (884); Long Beach, CA
November 15, 2018*; 7:00 p.m.		UC Santa Barbara	W 82–39	3–0	Galen Center (304); Los Angeles, CA
November 17, 2018*; 2:00 p.m.		Santa Clara	W 77–46	4–0	Galen Center (512); Los Angeles, CA
November 23, 2018*; 4:30 p.m.		vs. Utah State; Nugget Classic	W 55–46	5–0	Lawlor Events Center (1,070); Reno, NV
November 25, 2018*; 2:00 p.m.		at Nevada; Nugget Classic	W 72–51	6–0	Lawlor Events Center (982); Reno, NV
November 28, 2018*; 5:00 p.m.		Fresno State	W 62–61	7–0	Galen Center (286); Los Angeles, CA
December 1, 2018*; 5:00 p.m.		at UNLV	W 86–72	8–0	Cox Pavilion (1,579); Paradise, NV
December 16, 2018*; 2:00 p.m.		Cal State Northridge	W 58–42	9–0	Galen Center (1,194); Los Angeles, CA
December 19, 2018*; 3:00 p.m.		at No. 23 Texas A&M	L 51–71	9–1	Reed Arena (3,269); College Station, TX
December 22, 2018*; 12:00 p.m., ESPN+		at UT Arlington	W 73–61	10–1	College Park Center (844); Arlington, TX
Pac-12 regular season
December 30, 2018; 2:00 p.m., P12N		UCLA; Rivalry	L 65–72	10–2 (0–1)	Galen Center (1,173); Los Angeles, CA
January 4, 2019; 8:00 p.m., P12N		at No. 6 Stanford	L 64–72	10–3 (0–2)	Maples Pavilion (2,557); Stanford, CA
January 6, 2019; 3:00 p.m., P12N		at No. 18 California	L 59–66	10–4 (0–3)	Haas Pavilion (2,212); Berkeley, CA
January 11, 2019; 8:00 p.m., P12N		No. 5 Oregon	L 53–93	10–5 (0–4)	Galen Center (647); Los Angeles, CA
January 13, 2019; 12:00 p.m., P12N		No. 10 Oregon State	L 52–76	10–6 (0–5)	Galen Center (641); Los Angeles, CA
January 20, 2019; 4:00 p.m., P12N		at UCLA; Rivalry	W 72–67	11–6 (1–5)	Pauley Pavilion (6,103); Los Angeles, CA
January 25, 2019; 6:00 p.m., P12N		at Arizona	L 68–71	11–7 (1–6)	McKale Center (1,684); Tempe, AZ
January 27, 2019; 12:00 p.m., P12N		at No. 16 Arizona State	L 59–68	11–8 (1–7)	Wells Fargo Arena (2,701); Tempe, AZ
February 1, 2019; 7:00 p.m.		Washington	W 82–57	12–8 (2–7)	Galen Center (662); Los Angeles, CA
February 3, 2019; 2:00 p.m.		Washington State	W 81–73	13–8 (3–7)	Galen Center (172); Los Angeles, CA
February 8, 2019; 6:00 p.m., P12N		at No. 17 Utah	W 84–80	14–8 (4–7)	Jon M. Huntsman Center (4,003); Salt Lake City, UT
February 10, 2019; 12:00 p.m.		at Colorado	L 76–81	14–9 (4–8)	CU Events Center (2,215); Boulder, CO
February 15, 2019; 8:00 p.m., P12N		California	W 86–76	15–9 (5–8)	Galen Center (412); Los Angeles, CA
February 17, 2019; 12:00 p.m., P12N		No. 10 Stanford	L 67–69	15–10 (5–9)	Galen Center (922); Los Angeles, CA
February 22, 2019; 6:00 p.m., P12N		at No. 12 Oregon State	L 61–68	15–11 (5–10)	Gill Coliseum (5,084); Corvallis, OR
February 24, 2019; 11:00 a.m., P12N		at No. 2 Oregon	L 78–96	15–12 (5–11)	Matthew Knight Arena (8,232); Eugene, OR
March 1, 2019; 7:00 p.m., P12N		Colorado	W 84–77	16–12 (6–11)	Galen Center (377); Los Angeles, CA
March 3, 2019; 12:00 p.m., P12N		Utah	W 83–77 ^{OT}	17–12 (7–11)	Galen Center (2,786); Los Angeles, CA
Pac-12 women's tournament
March 7, 2019; 2:00 p.m., P12N	(9)	vs. (8) Arizona; First round	L 48–76	17–13	MGM Grand Garden Arena (3,012); Paradise, NV
*Non-conference game. ^{#}Rankings from AP poll. (#) Tournament seedings in parentheses. All times are in Pacific.

== Rankings ==
Regular-season polls
Poll	Pre- season	Week 2	Week 3	Week 4	Week 5	Week 6	Week 7	Week 8	Week 9	Week 10	Week 11	Week 12	Week 13	Week 14	Week 15	Week 16	Week 17	Week 18	Week 19	Final
AP				RV	RV	RV	RV	RV												N/A
Coaches			RV	RV	RV	RV	25	RV	RV											

Legend
	Increase in ranking
	Decrease in ranking
	Not ranked previous week
(RV)	Received votes
(NR)	Not ranked

== See also ==
- 2018–19 USC Trojans men's basketball team
