= 2018–19 Washington State Cougars women's basketball team =

Intercollegiate basketball season

2018–19 Washington State Cougars women's basketball
- Conference: Pac-12 Conference
- Record: 9–21 (4–14 Pac-12)
- Head coach: Kamie Ethridge (1st season)
- Assistant coaches: Laurie Koehn; Jackie Nared
- Home arena: Beasley Coliseum

2018–19 Pac-12 Conference women's basketball standings
	Conf.				Overall
Team	W		L	PCT	W		L	PCT
No. 7 Oregon	16	–	2	.889	33	–	5	.868
No. 6 Stanford †	15	–	3	.833	31	–	5	.861
No. 11 Oregon State	14	–	4	.778	26	–	8	.765
No. 20 UCLA	12	–	6	.667	22	–	13	.629
No. 22 Arizona State	10	–	7	.588	22	–	11	.667
Utah	9	–	9	.500	20	–	10	.667
California	9	–	9	.500	20	–	13	.606
Arizona	7	–	11	.389	24	–	13	.649
USC	7	–	11	.389	17	–	13	.567
Washington State	4	–	14	.222	9	–	21	.300
Washington	2	–	15	.118	11	–	21	.344
Colorado	2	–	16	.111	12	–	18	.400
† 2019 Pac-12 Tournament winner Rankings from AP Poll

The 2018–19 Washington State Cougars women's basketball team represented Washington State University during the 2018–19 NCAA Division I women's basketball season. The Cougars, led by first year head coach Kamie Ethridge, played their home games at the Beasley Coliseum and were members of the Pac-12 Conference. They finished the season 9–21, 4–14 in the Pac-12 to finish in tenth place. They lost in the first round of the Pac-12 women's tournament to California.

== Roster ==
2018–19 Washington State Cougars women's basketball team
Players
Coaches

Pos.	#	Name	Height	Year	Previous school	Hometown
G	2	Michaela Jones	5 ft 10 in (1.78 m)	Fr	Beatrice HS	Wymore, NE
G	10	Johanna Muzet	6 ft 0 in (1.83 m)	Jr	Lyon Basket	Lyon, France
G	11	Chanelle Molina	5 ft 9 in (1.75 m)	Jr	Konawaena HS	Kailua, HI
F	13	Shir Levy	5 ft 11 in (1.8 m)	Fr	Gymnasia Realit	Ness Ziona, Israel
F	15	Ula Motuga	6 ft 1 in (1.85 m)	Fr	Caterbury College	Logan, Australia
C	20	Maria Kostourkova	6 ft 4 in (1.93 m)	Sr	E.S.P.J.A.L.	Lisbon, Portugal
G	22	Celena Molina	5 ft 9 in (1.75 m)	RS Fr	Konawaena HS	Kailua, HI
G	23	Alexys Swedlund	5 ft 11 in (1.8 m)	Sr	St. Thomas More HS	Rapid City, SD
G	33	Cherliyn Molina	5 ft 6 in (1.68 m)	Fr	Konawaena HS	Kailua, HI
F	41	Jovana Subasic	6 ft 1 in (1.85 m)	RS So	N/A	Šabac, Serbia
F	45	Borislava Hristova	6 ft 0 in (1.83 m)	RS Jr	Georgi Benkovski	Varna, Bulgaria

Head coach

- Kamie Ethridge (Texas)

Assistant coach(es)

- Laurie Koehn (Kansas State)
- Jackie Nared (Saint Mary's)

Legend

- (C) Team captain
- (S) Suspended
- (I) Ineligible
- (W) Walk-on
- Injured
- Current redshirt

Roster

== Schedule ==
Date time, TV	Rank^{#}	Opponent^{#}	Result	Record	Site (attendance) city, state
Exhibition
10/29/2018*; 7:00 pm		Warner Pacific	W 106–41		Beasley Coliseum (538); Pullman, WA
Non-conference regular season
11/06/2018*; 7:00 pm		Utah State	L 61–72	0–1	Beasley Coliseum (526); Pullman, WA
11/11/2018*; 1:00 pm		Saint Mary's	L 64–70	0–2	Beasley Coliseum (397); Pullman, WA
11/16/2018*; 7:00 pm		Nebraska	W 87–84 ^{2OT}	1–2	Beasley Coliseum (535); Pullman, WA
11/18/2018*; 1:00 pm		UC Davis	L 62–75	1–3	Beasley Coliseum (585); Pullman, WA
11/23/2018*; 7:30 pm		at Cal State Northridge; Warner Center Marriott Thanksgiving Basketball Classic semifinals	L 52–65	1–4	Matadome (332); Northidge, CA
11/24/2018*; 3:30 pm		vs. Jacksonville State; Warner Center Marriott Thanksgiving Basketball Classic 3rd place game	W 64–51	2–4	Matadome (150); Northidge, CA
11/29/2018*; 7:00 pm		San Francisco	W 91–61	3–4	Beasley Coliseum (577); Pullman, WA
12/01/2018*; 1:00 pm		Boise State	W 95–71	4–4	Beasley Coliseum (547); Pullman, WA
12/09/2018*; 2:00 pm		at No. 24 Gonzaga	L 53–76	4–5	McCarthey Athletic Center (5,571); Spokane, WA
12/19/2018*; 2:30 pm		vs. Kansas; Duel in the Desert Desert Division semifinals	L 63–71	4–6	Cox Pavilion; Paradise, NV
12/20/2018*; 2:30 pm		vs. Wichita State; Duel in the Desert Desert Division 3rd place game	W 85–59	5–6	Cox Pavilion; Paradise, NV
Pac-12 regular season
12/30/2018; 2:00 pm, P12N		at Washington	W 79–76	6–6 (1–0)	Alaska Airlines Arena (2,677); Seattle, WA
01/04/2019; 7:00 pm, P12N		at No. 11 Oregon State	L 69–76	6–7 (1–1)	Gill Coliseum (4,733); Corvallis, OR
01/06/2019; 3:00 pm, P12N		at No. 5 Oregon	L 58–98	6–8 (1–2)	Matthew Knight Arena (5,946); Eugene, OR
01/11/2019; 7:00 pm, P12N		Utah	L 68–72	6–9 (1–3)	Beasley Coliseum (555); Pullman, WA
01/13/2019; 12:00 pm, P12N		Colorado	W 74–48	7–9 (2–3)	Beasley Coliseum (647); Pullman, WA
01/18/2019; 11:30 am		at California	L 63–77	7–10 (2–4)	Haas Pavilion (4,836); Berkeley, CA
01/20/2019; 12:00 pm, P12N		at No. 6 Stanford	L 64–85	7–11 (2–5)	Maples Pavilion (2,908); Stanford, CA
01/25/2019; 7:00 pm, P12N		No. 5 Oregon	L 64–79	7–12 (2–6)	Beasley Coliseum (931); Pullman, WA
01/27/2019; 12:00 pm, P12N		No. 9 Oregon State	L 35–52	7–13 (2–7)	Beasley Coliseum (1,043); Pullman, WA
02/01/2019; 7:00 pm		at UCLA	L 56–83	7–14 (2–8)	Pauley Pavilion (1,419); Los Angeles, CA
02/03/2019; 2:00 pm		at USC	L 73–81	7–15 (2–9)	Galen Center (172); Los Angeles, CA
02/07/2019; 7:00 pm		No. 20 Arizona State	L 46–61	7–16 (2–10)	Beasley Coliseum (591); Pullman, WA
02/09/2019; 12:00 pm, P12N		Arizona	W 90–88	8–16 (3–10)	Beasley Coliseum (711); Pullman, WA
02/15/2019; 7:00 pm, P12N		Washington	W 94–61	9–16 (4–10)	Beasley Coliseum (1,334); Pullman, WA
02/22/2019; 6:00 pm		at Colorado	L 61–72	9–17 (4–11)	CU Events Center (1,925); Boulder, CO
02/24/2019; 11:00 am		at Utah	L 67–75	9–18 (4–12)	Jon M. Huntsman Center (1,919); Salt Lake City, UT
03/01/2019; 7:00 pm, P12N		No. 7 Stanford	L 42–67	9–19 (4–13)	Beasley Coliseum (833); Pullman, WA
03/03/2019; 12:00 pm, P12N		California	L 58–80	9–20 (4–14)	Beasley Coliseum (713); Pullman, WA
Pac-12 Women's Tournament
03/07/2019; 6:00 pm, P12N	(10)	vs. (7) California; First Round	L 58–77	9–21	MGM Grand Garden Arena; Paradise, NV
*Non-conference game. ^{#}Rankings from AP Poll. (#) Tournament seedings in parentheses. All times are in Pacific Time.

== Rankings ==
- 2018–19 NCAA Division I women's basketball rankings

Regular season polls
Poll	Pre- season	Week 2	Week 3	Week 4	Week 5	Week 6	Week 7	Week 8	Week 9	Week 10	Week 11	Week 12	Week 13	Week 14	Week 15	Week 16	Week 17	Week 18	Week 19	Final
AP																				N/A
Coaches																				

Legend
	Increase in ranking
	Decrease in ranking
	Not ranked previous week
(RV)	Received votes
(NR)	Not ranked

== See also ==
- 2018–19 Washington State Cougars men's basketball team
