= 2018–19 UCLA Bruins women's basketball team =

American college basketball team

2018–19 UCLA Bruins women's basketball

NCAA tournament, Sweet Sixeen
- Conference: Pac-12 Conference

Ranking
- Coaches: No. 14
- AP: No. 20
- Record: 22–13 (12–6 Pac-12)
- Head coach: Cori Close (8th season)
- Assistant coaches: Shannon Perry; Tasha Brown; Tony Newnan
- Home arena: Pauley Pavilion

2018–19 Pac-12 Conference women's basketball standings
	Conf.				Overall
Team	W		L	PCT	W		L	PCT
No. 7 Oregon	16	–	2	.889	33	–	5	.868
No. 6 Stanford †	15	–	3	.833	31	–	5	.861
No. 11 Oregon State	14	–	4	.778	26	–	8	.765
No. 20 UCLA	12	–	6	.667	22	–	13	.629
No. 22 Arizona State	10	–	7	.588	22	–	11	.667
Utah	9	–	9	.500	20	–	10	.667
California	9	–	9	.500	20	–	13	.606
Arizona	7	–	11	.389	24	–	13	.649
USC	7	–	11	.389	17	–	13	.567
Washington State	4	–	14	.222	9	–	21	.300
Washington	2	–	15	.118	11	–	21	.344
Colorado	2	–	16	.111	12	–	18	.400
† 2019 Pac-12 Tournament winner Rankings from AP Poll

The 2018–19 UCLA Bruins women's basketball team represented the University of California, Los Angeles during the 2018–19 NCAA Division I women's basketball season. The Bruins, led by eighth year head coach Cori Close, played their home games at the Pauley Pavilion. They were members of the Pac-12 Conference.

The Bruins started the season 3–5, their worst start since the 2014–15 season, before going on a 6-game winning streak. The Bruins then lost their next four, including a 72–67 home loss on January 20 to a USC team that had failed to win any of its first five conference games. The loss dropped the Bruins to 0–3 in Pac-12 home games on the season; in the previous three seasons, they had only lost one Pac-12 home game.

The Bruins' next game following the USC loss was an upset road win over No. 16 Arizona State. The Bruins then traveled to Arizona and defeated the Wildcats 98–93 in three overtimes; the game was the first three-overtime game in UCLA women's basketball history, as well as the longest Pac-12 women's basketball game in over a decade.

On February 10, 2019, the Bruins upset No. 17 Utah, 100–90, in Salt Lake City. The Bruins' 40 points in the fourth quarter was the highest single-quarter point tally in UCLA women's basketball history.

On February 22, 2019, the Bruins upset No. 2 Oregon, 74–69, in Eugene. This was the Bruins' first win over a top five opponent since 2013. The Bruins erased a 22-point deficit in the comeback victory.

The Bruins finished the regular season with a 19–11 overall record and a 12–6 record in Pac-12 play (5–4 at home and 7–2 on the road), having won 10 of their last 12 regular season games. UCLA's only two losses during that 12-game span were against No. 10 Stanford at home and No. 12 Oregon State on the road.

On March 6, 2019, Pac-12 media members voted head coach Cori Close Pac-12 Coach of the Year.

The Bruins secured a (4) seed and a first-round bye to the Pac-12 Tournament. They defeated (5) Arizona State in the quarterfinals before losing to (1) Oregon in overtime in the semifinals.

The Bruins secured a (6) seed in the NCAA Women’s Tournament. They defeated (11) Tennessee 89–77 in the first round and defeated (3) Maryland 85–80 in the second round before losing to (2) Connecticut 69–61 in the Sweet Sixteen. The Bruins concluded the season with a 22–13 overall record. They won 13 of their last 17 games after starting the season 9–9.

== Offseason ==
=== Departures ===
Name	Pos.	Height	Year	Hometown	Reason for departure
Ashley Hearn	F	6'4"	RS Jr.	Rowlett, Texas	Graduated in December 2018; transferred mid-season to Texas A&M
Jordin Canada	G	5'6"	Sr.	Los Angeles, California	Graduated; selected 5th overall by the Seattle Storm in the 2018 WNBA draft
Monique Billings	F	6'4"	Sr.	Corona, California	Graduated; selected 15th overall by the Atlanta Dream in the 2018 WNBA draft
Kelli Hayes	G	6'0"	Sr.	San Jose, California	Graduated

=== Incoming transfer ===
Name	Pos.	Height	Year	Hometown	Previous school
Natalie Chou	Guard	6'1"	So	Plano, TX	Baylor

=== 2018 recruiting class ===
College recruiting information
Name	Hometown	School	Height	Weight	Commit date
Ahlana Smith; G	Charlotte, NC	Mallard Creek	5 ft 9 in (1.75 m)	N/A	
Ahlana Smith; G	Recruit ratings: ESPN: (97)				
Shayley Harris; P	Redding, CA	Folsom	6 ft 5 in (1.96 m)	N/A	
Shayley Harris; P	Recruit ratings: ESPN: (90)				
Kiara Jefferson; PG	Sacramento, CA	West Campus	5 ft 9 in (1.75 m)	N/A	
Kiara Jefferson; PG	Recruit ratings: ESPN: (90)				
Overall recruit ranking:
Note: In many cases, Scout, Rivals, 247Sports, On3, and ESPN may conflict in their listings of height and weight.; In these cases, the average was taken. ESPN grades are on a 100-point scale.; Sources:

== Roster ==
2018–19 UCLA Bruins women's basketball team
Players
Coaches

Pos.	#	Name	Height	Year	Previous school	Hometown
G	0	Chantel Horvat	6 ft 1 in (1.85 m)	So	Geelong College	Geelong, Australia
G	1	Kayla Owens	6 ft 1 in (1.85 m)	RS Fr	Langham Creek	Houston, TX
G	2	Ahlana Smith	5 ft 9 in (1.75 m)	Fr	Mallard Creek	Charlotte, NC
G	3	Kiara Jefferson	5 ft 9 in (1.75 m)	Fr	West Campus	Sacramento, CA
G	4	Lindsey Corsaro	6 ft 1 in (1.85 m)	RS Fr	Roncalli	Indianapolis, IN
F	10	Ally Rosenblum	6 ft 4 in (1.93 m)	Jr	Mater Dei	Newport Coast, CA
F	11	Lajahna Drummer	6 ft 1 in (1.85 m)	RS Sr	Long Beach Poly HS	Inglewood, CA
F	21	Michaela Onyenwere	6 ft 0 in (1.83 m)	So	Grandview	Aurora, CO
G	22	Kennedy Burke	6 ft 1 in (1.85 m)	Sr	Sierra Canyon School	Northridge, CA
G	23	Natalie Chou (redshirt)	6 ft 1 in (1.85 m)	Jr	Plano West; Baylor	Plano, TX
G	24	Japreece Dean	5 ft 6 in (1.68 m)	Sr	Vista Ridge; Texas Tech	Austin, TX
F/C	25	Shayley Harris	6 ft 6 in (1.98 m)	Fr	Folsom	Redding, CA
G	32	Chrissy Baird	6 ft 1 in (1.85 m)	RS Sr	Wheaton North	Wheaton, IL
F	33	Lauryn Miller	6 ft 1 in (1.85 m)	So	Kirkwood	Kirkwood, MO
G	51	Eliana Sigal (W)	5 ft 10 in (1.78 m)	Fr	Tarbut V' Torah	Irvine, CA

Head coach

- Cori Close (UC Santa Barbara)

Assistant coach(es)

- Shannon Perry (Iowa)
- Tony Newnan (UC Santa Barbara)
- Tasha Brown (St. Ambrose)

Legend

- (C) Team captain
- (S) Suspended
- (I) Ineligible
- (W) Walk-on
- Injured
- Current redshirt

Roster

== Schedule ==
Date time, TV	Rank^{#}	Opponent^{#}	Result	Record	Site (attendance) city, state
Exhibition
11/03/2018*; 2:00 pm		Westmont	W 75–55		Pauley Pavilion (815); Los Angeles, CA
Non-conference regular season
11/06/2018*; 7:30 pm		at Loyola Marymount	L 63–69	0–1	Gersten Pavilion (498); Los Angeles, CA
11/11/2018*; 2:00 pm		Rice	W 59–50	1–1	Pauley Pavilion (1,353); Los Angeles, CA
11/14/2018*; 11:00 am, P12N		No. 14 Georgia	W 80–69	2–1	Pauley Pavilion (5,113); Los Angeles, CA
11/18/2018*; 2:00 pm		Seton Hall	W 78–62	3–1	Pauley Pavilion (2,157); Los Angeles, CA
11/22/2018*; 12:00 pm		vs. North Carolina; Paradise Jam tournament Island Division	L 49–83	3–2	Sports and Fitness Center (874); Saint Thomas, USVI
11/23/2018*; 10:00 am		vs. Kentucky; Paradise Jam Tournament Island Division	L 74–75 ^{OT}	3–3	Sports and Fitness Center; Saint Thomas, USVI
11/24/2018*; 12:00 pm		vs. No. 17 South Florida; Paradise Jam Tournament Island Division	L 56–60	3–4	Sports and Fitness Center (814); Saint Thomas, USVI
12/02/2018*; 1:00 pm, P12N		Indiana	L 65–67	3–5	Pauley Pavilion (3,511); Los Angeles, CA
12/07/2018*; 7:00 pm		Fresno State	W 89–80	4–5	Pauley Pavilion (1,190); Los Angeles, CA
12/16/2018*; 2:00 pm		Oklahoma State	W 71–59	5–5	Pauley Pavilion (2,501); Los Angeles, CA
12/19/2018*; 4:00 pm, ESPN+		at UIC	W 78–47	6–5	Credit Union 1 Arena (640); Chicago, IL
12/28/2018*; 5:00 pm		Cal Poly	W 81–35	7–5	Pauley Pavilion (2,121); Los Angeles, CA
Pac-12 regular season
12/30/2018; 2:00 pm, P12N		at USC; Rivalry	W 72–65	8–5 (1–0)	Galen Center (1,173); Los Angeles, CA
01/04/2019; 7:00 pm, P12N		at No. 18 California	W 84–79 ^{OT}	9–5 (2–0)	Haas Pavilion (2,107); Berkeley, CA
01/06/2019; 1:00 pm, P12N		at No. 6 Stanford	L 80–86	9–6 (2–1)	Maples Pavilion (3,231); Stanford, CA
01/11/2019; 7:00 pm, P12N		No. 10 Oregon State	L 73–83	9–7 (2–2)	Pauley Pavilion (2,404); Los Angeles, CA
01/13/2019; 2:00 pm, P12N		No. 5 Oregon	L 52–72	9–8 (2–3)	Pauley Pavilion (8,036); Los Angeles, CA
01/20/2019; 4:00 pm, P12N		USC; Rivalry	L 67–72	9–9 (2–4)	Pauley Pavilion (6,103); Los Angeles, CA
01/25/2019; 10:00 am, P12N		at No. 16 Arizona State	W 61–59	10–9 (3–4)	Wells Fargo Arena (7,322); Tempe, AZ
01/27/2019; 1:00 pm, P12N		at Arizona	W 98–93 ^{3OT}	11–9 (4–4)	McKale Center (2,327); Tucson, AZ
02/01/2019; 7:00 pm		Washington State	W 83–56	12–9 (5–4)	Pauley Pavilion (1,419); Los Angeles, CA
02/03/2019; 12:30 pm		Washington	W 76–60	13–9 (6–4)	Pauley Pavilion (1,642); Los Angeles, CA
02/08/2019; 6:00 pm, P12N		at Colorado	W 64–60	14–9 (7–4)	CU Events Center (2,261); Boulder, CO
02/10/2019; 11:00 am, P12N		at No. 17 Utah	W 100–90	15–9 (8–4)	Jon M. Huntsman Center (2,107); Salt Lake City, UT
02/15/2019; 6:00 pm, P12N		No. 10 Stanford	L 51–65	15–10 (8–5)	Pauley Pavilion (2,479); Los Angeles, CA
02/17/2019; 4:00 pm, P12N		California	W 80–74	16–10 (9–5)	Pauley Pavilion (2,127); Los Angeles, CA
02/22/2019; 8:00 pm, P12N		at No. 2 Oregon	W 74–69	17–10 (10–5)	Matthew Knight Arena (8,858); Eugene, OR
02/24/2019; 1:00 pm, P12N		at No. 12 Oregon State	L 72–75	17–11 (10–6)	Gill Coliseum (5,916); Corvallis, OR
03/01/2019; 7:00 pm	No. 25	Utah	W 76–60	18–11 (11–6)	Pauley Pavilion (1,450); Los Angeles, CA
03/03/2019; 12:00 pm, P12N	No. 25	Colorado	W 84–50	19–11 (12–6)	Pauley Pavilion (2,411); Los Angeles, CA
Pac-12 Women's tournament
03/08/2019; 11:30 am, P12N	(4) No. 25	vs. (5) No. 20 Arizona State; Quarterfinals	W 73–69	20–11	MGM Grand Garden Arena; Paradise, NV
03/09/2019; 6:00 pm, P12N	(4) No. 25	vs. (1) No. 6 Oregon; Semifinals	L 83–88 ^{OT}	20–12	MGM Grand Garden Arena; Paradise, NV
NCAA Women's tournament
03/23/2019*; 10:30 am, ESPN2	(6 A) No. 20	vs. (11 A) Tennessee; First Round	W 89–77	21–12	Xfinity Center (5,072); College Park, MD
03/25/2019*; 4:00 pm, ESPN	(6 A) No. 20	at (3 A) No. 9 Maryland; Second Round	W 85–80	22–12	Xfinity Center (3,941); College Park, MD
03/29/2019*; 4:00 pm, ESPN	(6 A) No. 20	vs. (2 A) No. 2 Connecticut; Sweet Sixteen	L 61–69	22–13	Times Union Center; Albany, NY
*Non-conference game. ^{#}Rankings from AP Poll. (#) Tournament seedings in parentheses. A=Albany Region. All times are in Pacific Time.

== Rankings ==
2018–19 NCAA Division I women's basketball rankings

Regular season polls
Poll	Pre- Season	Week 2	Week 3	Week 4	Week 5	Week 6	Week 7	Week 8	Week 9	Week 10	Week 11	Week 12	Week 13	Week 14	Week 15	Week 16	Week 17	Week 18	Week 19	Final
AP	RV		RV												RV	RV	25	25	20	N/A
Coaches	23	23^	RV							RV					RV	RV	RV	RV	RV	14

Legend
	Increase in ranking
	Decrease in ranking
	Not ranked previous week
(RV)	Received Votes
(NR)	Not Ranked

^Coaches did not release a Week 2 poll.

== Honors ==
- March 5, 2019 – Michaela Onyenwere was named All-Pac-12 team, Kennedy Burke was named All-Pac-12 Honorable Mention and All-Defensive team, Lindsey Corsaro named to the All-Freshman team
- March 6, 2019 – Coach Cori Close was named the Pac-12 media Coach of the Year
- March 10, 2019 – Kennedy Burke and Japreece Dean were named to the Pac-12 All-Tournament Team

== See also ==
2018–19 UCLA Bruins men's basketball team

== Notes ==
- March 3, 2019 – The Bruins earned a four seed in the Pac-12 Tournament and play on Friday, March 8's quarterfinals at 11:30 a.m. (PT)
