= 2018–19 Arizona State Sun Devils women's basketball team =

Intercollegiate basketball season

2018–19 Arizona State Sun Devils women's basketball

ASU Classic Champions

NCAA Women's Tournament, Sweet Sixteen
- Conference: Pac-12 Conference

Ranking
- Coaches: No. 15
- AP: No. 23
- Record: 22–11 (10–7 Pac-12)
- Head coach: Charli Turner Thorne (22nd season)
- Assistant coaches: Jackie Moore; Angie Nelp; Briann January
- Home arena: Wells Fargo Arena

2018–19 Pac-12 Conference women's basketball standings
	Conf.				Overall
Team	W		L	PCT	W		L	PCT
No. 7 Oregon	16	–	2	.889	33	–	5	.868
No. 6 Stanford †	15	–	3	.833	31	–	5	.861
No. 11 Oregon State	14	–	4	.778	26	–	8	.765
No. 20 UCLA	12	–	6	.667	22	–	13	.629
No. 22 Arizona State	10	–	7	.588	22	–	11	.667
Utah	9	–	9	.500	20	–	10	.667
California	9	–	9	.500	20	–	13	.606
Arizona	7	–	11	.389	24	–	13	.649
USC	7	–	11	.389	17	–	13	.567
Washington State	4	–	14	.222	9	–	21	.300
Washington	2	–	15	.118	11	–	21	.344
Colorado	2	–	16	.111	12	–	18	.400
† 2019 Pac-12 Tournament winner Rankings from AP Poll

The 2018–19 Arizona State Sun Devils women's basketball team represented Arizona State University during the 2018–19 NCAA Division I women's basketball season. The Sun Devils, led by twenty second year head coach Charli Turner Thorne, played their games at Wells Fargo Arena and were members of the Pac-12 Conference. They finished the season 22–11, 10–7 in Pac-12 play to finish in fifth place. They advanced to the quarterfinals of the Pac-12 women's tournament, where they lost to UCLA. They received an at-large bid to the NCAA women's tournament, where they defeated UCF and Miami (FL) in the first and second rounds before losing to Mississippi State in the sweet sixteen.

== Roster ==
2018–19 Arizona State Sun Devils women's basketball team
Players
Coaches

Pos.	#	Name	Height	Year	Previous school	Hometown
G	0	Taya Hanson	5 ft 10 in (1.78 m)	Fr	Kelowna	Kelowna, BC
G	1	Reili Richardson	5 ft 11 in (1.8 m)	Jr	Brea Olinda	Brea, CA
G	4	Kiara Russell	5 ft 8 in (1.73 m)	Jr	Osseo	Minneapolis, MN
G	5	Jamie Loera	5 ft 9 in (1.75 m)	Fr	Moses Lake	Moses Lake, WA
G	11	Robbi Ryan	5 ft 9 in (1.75 m)	Jr	Sheridan	Sheridan, WY
F	21	Sophia Elenga	6 ft 1 in (1.85 m)	Sr	Lycee Alain Fournier	Nogent-sur-Oise, France
G	22	Courtney Ekmark	6 ft 0 in (1.83 m)	RS Sr	St. Mary's; Connecticut	Arcadia, AZ
G/F	23	Iris Mbulito	6 ft 1 in (1.85 m)	Fr	IES Castilian poet Tomás Morales	Las Palmas de Gran Canaria, Spain
G/F	24	Bre’yanna Sanders	6 ft 0 in (1.83 m)	So	Clovis West	Fresno, CA
F	32	Jayde Van Hyfte	6 ft 1 in (1.85 m)	Fr	Annawan	Annawan, IL
C	33	Charnea Johnson-Chapman	6 ft 3 in (1.91 m)	Sr	Canyon Springs	Moreno Valley, CA
F	42	Kianna Ibis	6 ft 1 in (1.85 m)	Sr	Benson	Omaha, NE
C	44	Eva Rubin	6 ft 5 in (1.96 m)	So	Homewood Flossmoor	Flossmoor, IL
F	52	Jamie Ruden	6 ft 2 in (1.88 m)	Jr	John Marshall	Rochester, MN

Head coach

- Charli Turner Thorne (Stanford)

Assistant coach(es)

- Jackie Moore (Armstrong State)
- Angie Nelp (Colorado State)
- Briann January (Arizona State)

Legend

- (C) Team captain
- (S) Suspended
- (I) Ineligible
- (W) Walk-on
- Injured
- Current redshirt

Roster

== Schedule ==
Date time, TV	Rank^{#}	Opponent^{#}	Result	Record	Site (attendance) city, state
Non-conference regular season
11/06/2018*; 8:30 pm	No. 23	Incarnate Word	W 81–43	1–0	Wells Fargo Arena (2,221); Tempe, AZ
11/11/2018*; 5:30 pm, ESPN2	No. 23	vs. No. 4 Baylor; Showdown on the Rez	L 59–65	1–1	Bee Hółdzil Fighting Scouts Events Center (5,609); Fort Defiance, AZ
11/18/2018*; 6:00 pm, SECN	No. 22	at Arkansas	W 88–85	2–1	Bud Walton Arena (1,519); Fayetteville, AR
11/23/2018*; 3:30 pm	No. 19	vs. No. 5 Louisville; South Point Thanksgiving Shootout	L 56–58	2–2	South Point Arena; Enterprise, NV
11/24/2018*; 3:30 pm	No. 19	vs. Southern Illinois; South Point Thanksgiving Shootout	W 82–38	3–2	South Point Arena; Enterprise, NV
12/01/2018*; 1:00 pm, P12N	No. 19	Louisiana Tech; ASU Classic semifinals	W 80–44	4–2	Wells Fargo Arena (2,026); Tempe, AZ
12/02/2018*; 2:00 pm	No. 19	Tulsa; ASU Classic Championship	W 70–52	5–2	Wells Fargo Arena (1,881); Tempe, AZ
12/07/2018*; 6:00 pm	No. 17	Southern	W 69–47	6–2	Wells Fargo Arena (1,674); Tempe, AZ
12/09/2018*; 2:00 pm, Stadium	No. 17	at Colorado State	W 70–39	7–2	Moby Arena (1,120); Fort Collins, CO
12/16/2018*; 3:00 pm	No. 17	vs. Kansas State	W 65–51	8–2	Mitchell Hall Gymnasium (1,294); La Crosse, WI
12/20/2018*; 2:00 pm	No. 17	Fresno State	W 68–52	9–2	Wells Fargo Arena (1,653); Tempe, AZ
Pac-12 regular season
12/30/2018; 5:00 pm, P12N	No. 17	at Arizona	L 39–51	9–3 (0–1)	McKale Center (5,006); Tucson, AZ
01/04/2019; 7:00 pm, P12N	No. 22	at Utah	W 65–63	10–3 (1–1)	Jon M. Huntsman Center (3,310); Salt Lake City, UT
01/06/2019; 2:00 pm, P12N	No. 22	at Colorado	W 76–70	11–3 (2–1)	CU Events Center (2,024); Boulder, CO
01/11/2019; 7:00 pm, P12N	No. 19	No. 6 Stanford	L 65–72	11–4 (2–2)	Wells Fargo Arena (2,728); Tempe, AZ
01/13/2019; 5:00 pm, P12N	No. 19	No. 24 California	W 62–61	12–4 (3–2)	Wells Fargo Arena (2,348); Tempe, AZ
01/18/2019; 7:00 pm, P12N	No. 19	at No. 5 Oregon	L 71–77	12–5 (3–3)	Matthew Knight Arena (6,769); Eugene, OR
01/20/2019; 3:00 pm, P12N	No. 19	at No. 10 Oregon State	W 79–76 ^{2OT}	13–5 (4–3)	Gill Coliseum (5,690); Corvallis, OR
01/25/2019; 11:00 am, P12N	No. 16	UCLA	L 59–61	13–6 (4–4)	Wells Fargo Arena (7,322); Tempe, AZ
01/27/2019; 1:00 pm, P12N	No. 16	USC	W 68–59	14–6 (5–4)	Wells Fargo Arena (2,701); Tempe, AZ
02/01/2019; 6:00 pm, P12N	No. 21	Arizona	W 60–47	15–6 (6–4)	Wells Fargo Arena (3,686); Tempe, AZ
02/07/2019; 8:00 pm	No. 20	at Washington State	W 61–46	16–6 (7–4)	Beasley Coliseum (591); Pullman, WA
02/09/2019; 3:00 pm	No. 20	at Washington; Cancelled; inclement weather			Alaska Airlines Arena; Seattle, WA
02/15/2019; 7:00 pm	No. 19	Colorado	W 66–49	17–6 (8–4)	Wells Fargo Arena (2,554); Tempe, AZ
02/17/2019; 2:00 pm, P12N	No. 19	Utah	W 60–58	18–6 (9–4)	Wells Fargo Arena (2,316); Tempe, AZ
02/22/2019; 8:00 pm, P12N	No. 17	at California	L 60–69	18–7 (9–5)	Haas Pavilion (1,667); Berkeley, CA
02/24/2019; 2:00 pm, P12N	No. 17	at No. 7 Stanford	L 50–71	18–8 (9–6)	Maples Pavilion (3,057); Stanford, CA
03/01/2019; 6:00 pm, P12N	No. 21	No. 9 Oregon State	W 66–54	19–8 (10–6)	Wells Fargo Arena (3,176); Tempe, AZ
03/03/2019; 1:00 pm, P12N	No. 21	No. 6 Oregon	L 59–66	19–9 (10–7)	Wells Fargo Arena (4,033); Tempe, AZ
Pac-12 Women's Tournament
03/07/2019; 12:30 pm, P12N	(5) No. 20	vs. (12) Colorado; First Round	W 66–49	20–9	MGM Grand Garden Arena; Paradise, NV
03/08/2019; 12:30 pm, P12N	(5) No. 20	vs. (4) No. 25 UCLA; Quarterfinals	L 69–73	20–10	MGM Grand Garden Arena; Paradise, NV
NCAA Women's Tournament
03/22/2019*; 4:00 pm, ESPN2	(5 P) No. 22	vs. (12 P) UCF; First Round	W 60–45	21–10	Watsco Center; Coral Gables, FL
03/24/2019*; 4:00 pm, ESPN2	(5 P) No. 22	at (4 P) No. 19 Miami (FL); Second Round	W 57–55	22–10	Watsco Center (2,056); Coral Gables, FL
03/29/2019*; 6:00 pm, ESPN2	(5 P) No. 22	vs. (1 P) No. 4 Mississippi State; Sweet Sixteen	L 53–76	22–11	Moda Center; Portland, OR
*Non-conference game. ^{#}Rankings from AP Poll. (#) Tournament seedings in parentheses. P=Portland Region. All times are in Mountain Time.

== Rankings ==
Ranking movements Legend: ██ Increase in ranking ██ Decrease in ranking RV = Received votes т = Tied with team above or below
	Week																			
Poll	Pre	1	2	3	4	5	6	7	8	9	10	11	12	13	14	15	16	17	18	Final
AP	23	22	19	19	17	17	17	17	22	19	19	16	21	20т	19	17	21	20	23	Not released
Coaches	RV	RV^	25	23	19т	19	20	18	22	19	16	16	20	18	17	15	20	20	20	15

^Coaches' Poll did not release a second poll at the same time as the AP.

== See also ==
2018–19 Arizona State Sun Devils men's basketball team
