= 2018–19 Washington Huskies women's basketball team =

Intercollegiate basketball season

2018–19 Washington Huskies women's basketball
- Conference: Pac-12 Conference
- Record: 11–21 (2–15 Pac-12)
- Head coach: Jody Wynn (2nd season)
- Associate head coach: Derek Wynn
- Assistant coaches: Michelle Augustavo; Paul Reed
- Home arena: Alaska Airlines Arena

2018–19 Pac-12 Conference women's basketball standings
	Conf.				Overall
Team	W		L	PCT	W		L	PCT
No. 7 Oregon	16	–	2	.889	33	–	5	.868
No. 6 Stanford †	15	–	3	.833	31	–	5	.861
No. 11 Oregon State	14	–	4	.778	26	–	8	.765
No. 20 UCLA	12	–	6	.667	22	–	13	.629
No. 22 Arizona State	10	–	7	.588	22	–	11	.667
Utah	9	–	9	.500	20	–	10	.667
California	9	–	9	.500	20	–	13	.606
Arizona	7	–	11	.389	24	–	13	.649
USC	7	–	11	.389	17	–	13	.567
Washington State	4	–	14	.222	9	–	21	.300
Washington	2	–	15	.118	11	–	21	.344
Colorado	2	–	16	.111	12	–	18	.400
† 2019 Pac-12 Tournament winner Rankings from AP Poll

The 2018–19 Washington Huskies women's basketball team represented University of Washington during the 2018–19 NCAA Division I women's basketball season. The Huskies were led by second-year head coach Jody Wynn. They played their home games at Alaska Airlines Arena at Hec Edmundson Pavilion in Seattle, Washington, as members of the Pac-12 Conference. They finished the season 11–21, 2–15 in Pac-12 play to finish in eleventh place. They advanced to the semifinals of the Pac-12 women's basketball tournament, where they lost to Stanford.

== Roster ==
2018–19 Washington Huskies women's basketball team
Players
Coaches

Pos.	#	Name	Height	Year	Previous school	Hometown
F	1	Hannah Johnson	6 ft 1 in (1.85 m)	RS Sr	Bishop Alemany	Los Angeles, CA
F	2	Fapou Semebene	6 ft 1 in (1.85 m)	So	View Park	Los Angeles, CA
F	3	Mai-Loni Henson	6 ft 1 in (1.85 m)	Jr	La Jolla Country Day	Temecula, CA
G	4	Amber Melgoza	5 ft 10 in (1.78 m)	Jr	Santa Barbara	Santa Barbara, CA
G	5	Natalie Romeo	5 ft 7 in (1.7 m)	RS Sr	Carondelet; Nebraska	Martinez, CA
G	12	Montana Hagstrom	5 ft 7 in (1.7 m)	RS So	Sammamish; Bellevue College	Bellevue, WA
F	15	Haley Van Dyke	6 ft 1 in (1.85 m)	Fr	Campolindo	Moraga, CA
F	22	Khayla Rooks	6 ft 1 in (1.85 m)	So	Mission Hills	San Marcos, CA
G	24	Jenna Moser	5 ft 6 in (1.68 m)	RS Sr	Colton	Colton, WA
G	25	T. T. Watkins	6 ft 0 in (1.83 m)	Fr	Walnut	Walnut, CA
F	32	Gigi Garcia	6 ft 2 in (1.88 m)	RS So	C. K. McClatchy	Sacramento, CA
C	34	Deja Strother	6 ft 5 in (1.96 m)	RS Jr	Inglemoor	Kenmore, WA
G	35	Alexis Griggsby	5 ft 9 in (1.75 m)	So	Sierra Canyon	Northridge, CA
G	44	Missy Peterson	5 ft 11 in (1.8 m)	So	Edmonds-Woodway	Edmonds, WA
F	53	Darcy Rees	6 ft 4 in (1.93 m)	Fr	Adelaide	Adelaide, South Australia

Head coach

- Jody Wynn (USC)

Assistant coach(es)

- Derek Wynn (AHC, Cal State Fullerton)
- Michelle Augustavo (Washington)
- Paul Reed (Langston)

Legend

- (C) Team captain
- (S) Suspended
- (I) Ineligible
- (W) Walk-on
- Injured
- Current redshirt

Roster

== Schedule ==
Date time, TV	Rank^{#}	Opponent^{#}	Result	Record	Site (attendance) city, state
Non-conference regular season
11/08/2018*; 7:00 pm		Cal State Fullerton	W 83–74	1–0	Alaska Airlines Arena (1,222); Seattle, WA
11/11/2018*; 2:00 pm		Northern Arizona	W 81–59	2–0	Alaska Airlines Arena (1,503); Seattle, WA
11/18/2018*; 2:00 pm		at Tulane	L 51–63	2–1	Devlin Fieldhouse (872); New Orleans, LA
11/23/2018*; 10:30 am		vs. Duke; Gulf Coast Showcase quarterfinals	W 71–64	3–1	Hertz Arena (458); Estero, FL
11/24/2018*; 2:00 pm		vs. Fordham; Gulf Coast Showcase semifinals	L 57–65	3–2	Hertz Arena (753); Estero, FL
11/25/2018*; 2:00 pm		vs. Michigan; Gulf Coast Showcase 3rd place game	L 73–80	3–3	Hertz Arena; Estero, FL
11/30/2018*; 6:00 pm		at Seattle	W 69–58	4–3	Redhawk Center (787); Seattle, WA
12/02/2018*; 12:00 pm, P12N		George Mason	W 81–52	5–3	Alaska Airlines Arena (1,260); Seattle, WA
12/05/2018*; 8:00 pm, P12N		Ohio State	W 69–59	6–3	Alaska Airlines Arena (1,236); Seattle, WA
12/15/2018*; 1:00 pm		Montana; Husky Classic semifinals	W 69–54	7–3	Alaska Airlines Arena (1,600); Seattle, WA
12/16/2018*; 4:00 pm		Boise State; Husky Classic championship	L 69–73	7–4	Alaska Airlines Arena (1,417); Seattle, WA
12/20/2018*; 7:00 pm		No. 4 Mississippi State	L 56–103	7–5	Alaska Airlines Arena (1,669); Seattle, WA
Pac-12 regular season
12/30/2018; 2:00 pm, P12N		Washington State	L 76–79	7–6 (0–1)	Alaska Airlines Arena (2,677); Seattle, WA
01/04/2019; 6:00 pm, P12N		at No. 5 Oregon	L 71–84	7–7 (0–2)	Matthew Knight Arena (6,013); Eugene, OR
01/06/2019; 2:00 pm		at No. 11 Oregon State	L 67–78	7–8 (0–3)	Gill Coliseum (4,854); Corvallis, OR
01/11/2019; 7:00 pm, P12N		Colorado	W 68–58	8–8 (1–3)	Alaska Airlines Arena (1,634); Seattle, WA
01/13/2019; 2:00 pm, P12N		Utah	L 43–58	8–9 (1–4)	Alaska Airlines Arena (2,250); Seattle, WA
01/18/2019; 7:00 pm, P12N		at No. 6 Stanford	L 54–91	8–10 (1–5)	Maples Pavilion (2,535); Stanford, CA
01/20/2019; 2:00 pm, P12N		at California	L 70–79	8–11 (1–6)	Haas Pavilion (2,095); Berkeley, CA
01/25/2019; 8:00 pm, P12N		No. 9 Oregon State	L 39–86	8–12 (1–7)	Alaska Airlines Arena (1,887); Seattle, WA
01/27/2019; 2:00 pm, P12N		No. 5 Oregon	L 57–76	8–13 (1–8)	Alaska Airlines Arena (4,295); Seattle, WA
02/01/2019; 7:00 pm		at USC	L 57–82	8–14 (1–9)	Galen Center (662); Los Angeles, CA
02/03/2019; 12:30 pm		at UCLA	L 60–76	8–15 (1–10)	Pauley Pavilion (1,042); Los Angeles, CA
02/07/2019; 7:00 pm		Arizona	L 59–69	8–16 (1–11)	Alaska Airlines Arena (1,444); Seattle, WA
02/09/2019; 2:00 pm		No. 20 Arizona State; Cancelled; inclement weather			Alaska Airlines Arena; Seattle, WA
02/15/2019; 7:00 pm, P12N		at Washington State	L 61–94	8–17 (1–12)	Beasley Coliseum (1,334); Pullman, WA
02/22/2019; 6:00 pm		at Utah	L 56–88	8–18 (1–13)	Jon M. Huntsman Center (3,743); Salt Lake City, UT
02/24/2019; 12:00 pm		at Colorado	W 60–46	9–18 (2–13)	CU Events Center (3,698); Boulder, CO
03/01/2019; 7:00 pm		California	L 65–71	9–19 (2–14)	Alaska Airlines Arena (2,333); Seattle, WA
03/03/2019; 2:00 pm, P12N		No. 7 Stanford	L 53–72	9–20 (2–15)	Alaska Airlines Arena (2,760); Seattle, WA
Pac-12 Women's Tournament
03/07/2019; 8:30 pm, P12N	(11)	vs. (6) Utah; First Round	W 64–54	10–20	MGM Grand Garden Arena (3,168); Paradise, NV
03/08/2019; 8:30 pm, P12N	(11)	vs. (3) No. 11 Oregon State; Quarterfinals	W 68–67	11–20	MGM Grand Garden Arena (4,489); Paradise, NV
03/09/2019; 8:30 pm, P12N	(11)	vs. (2) No. 7 Stanford; Semifinals	L 61–72	11–21	MGM Grand Garden Arena (5,189); Paradise, NV
*Non-conference game. ^{#}Rankings from AP Poll. (#) Tournament seedings in parentheses. All times are in Pacific Time.

== Rankings ==
Regular season polls
Poll	Pre- season	Week 2	Week 3	Week 4	Week 5	Week 6	Week 7	Week 8	Week 9	Week 10	Week 11	Week 12	Week 13	Week 14	Week 15	Week 16	Week 17	Week 18	Week 19	Final
AP																				N/A
Coaches	RV																			

Legend
	Increase in ranking
	Decrease in ranking
	Not ranked previous week
(RV)	Received votes
(NR)	Not ranked

== See also ==
- 2018–19 Washington Huskies men's basketball team
