= 2019 Pac-12 Conference women's basketball tournament =

- Classification: Division I
- Season: 2018–19
- Teams: 12
- Site: MGM Grand Garden Arena; Las Vegas, NV
- Champions: Stanford (13th title)
- Winning coach: Tara VanDerveer (13th title)
- MVP: Alanna Smith (Stanford)
- Attendance: 25,412
- Television: Pac-12 Network, ESPN2

2018–19 Pac-12 Conference women's basketball standings
| | Conf. | | | | Overall |
| Team | W | | L | PCT | W | | L | PCT |
|---|---|---|---|---|---|---|---|---|
| No. 7 Oregon | 16 | – | 2 | .889 | 33 | – | 5 | .868 |
| No. 6 Stanford † | 15 | – | 3 | .833 | 31 | – | 5 | .861 |
| No. 11 Oregon State | 14 | – | 4 | .778 | 26 | – | 8 | .765 |
| No. 20 UCLA | 12 | – | 6 | .667 | 22 | – | 13 | .629 |
| No. 22 Arizona State | 10 | – | 7 | .588 | 22 | – | 11 | .667 |
| Utah | 9 | – | 9 | .500 | 20 | – | 10 | .667 |
| California | 9 | – | 9 | .500 | 20 | – | 13 | .606 |
| Arizona | 7 | – | 11 | .389 | 24 | – | 13 | .649 |
| USC | 7 | – | 11 | .389 | 17 | – | 13 | .567 |
| Washington State | 4 | – | 14 | .222 | 9 | – | 21 | .300 |
| Washington | 2 | – | 15 | .118 | 11 | – | 21 | .344 |
| Colorado | 2 | – | 16 | .111 | 12 | – | 18 | .400 |
† 2019 Pac-12 Tournament winner Rankings from AP Poll

The 2019 Pac-12 Conference women's basketball tournament presented by New York Life was a postseason tournament that was held from March 7–10, 2019 at MGM Grand Garden Arena on the Las Vegas Strip in Paradise, Nevada.

== Seeds ==
Teams were seeded by conference record, with ties broken in the following order: Tie-breaking procedures for determining all tournament seeding was:

- For two-team tie

1. Results of head-to-head competition during the regular season.

2. Each team's record (won-lost percentage) vs. the team occupying the highest position in the final regular standings, and then continuing down through the standings until one team gains an advantage. When arriving at another group of tied teams while comparing records, use each team's record (won-lost percentage) against the collective tied teams as a group (prior to that group's own tie-breaking procedure), rather than the performance against individual tied teams.

3. Won-lost percentage against all Division I opponents.

4. Coin toss conducted by the Commissioner or designee.

- For multiple-team tie

1. Results (won-lost percentage) of collective head-to-head competition during the regular season among the tied teams.

2. If more than two teams are still tied, each of the tied team's record (won-lost percentage) vs. the team occupying the highest position in the final regular season standings, and then continuing down through the standings, eliminating teams with inferior records, until one team gains an advantage.

When arriving at another group of tied teams while comparing records, use each team's record (won-lost percentage) against the collective tied teams as a group (prior to that group's own tie-breaking procedure), rather than the performance against individual tied teams.

After one team has an advantage and is seeded, all remaining teams in the multiple-team tie-breaker will repeat the multiple-team tie-breaking procedure.

If at any point the multiple-team tie is reduced to two teams, the two-team tie-breaking procedure will be applied.

3. Won-lost percentage against all Division I opponents.

4. Coin toss conducted by the Commissioner or designee.

| Seed | School | Conf (Overall) | Tiebreaker |
|---|---|---|---|
| #1 | Oregon | 16–2 (27–3) | |
| #2 | Stanford | 15–3 (25–4) | |
| #3 | Oregon State | 14–4 (24–6) | |
| #4 | UCLA | 12–6 (19–11) | |
| #5 | Arizona State | 10–7 (19–9) | |
| #6 | Utah | 9–9 (20–9) | 1–0 vs. CAL |
| #7 | California | 9–9 (18–11) | 0–1 vs. UTAH |
| #8 | Arizona | 7–11 (17–12) | 1–0 vs USC |
| #9 | USC | 7–11 (17–12) | 0–1 vs ARIZ |
| #10 | Washington State | 4–14 (9–20) | |
| #11 | Washington | 2–15 (9–20) | |
| #12 | Colorado | 2–16 (12–17) | |

== Schedule ==
Thursday-Sunday, March 7–10, 2018

The top four seeds received a first-round bye.

| Session | Game | Time* | Matchup^{#} | Television | Attendance |
First Round – Thursday, March 7
| 1 | 1 | 11:30 AM | #5 Arizona State vs. #12 Colorado | P12N | 3,012 |
| 1 | 2 | 2:00 PM | #8 Arizona vs. #9 USC | P12N | 3,012 |
| 2 | 3 | 6:00 PM | #7 California vs. #10 Washington State | P12N | 3,168 |
| 2 | 4 | 8:30 PM | #6 Utah vs. #11 Washington | P12N | 3,168 |
Quarterfinals – Friday, March 8
| 3 | 5 | 11:30 AM | #4 UCLA vs #5 Arizona State | P12N | 4,531 |
| 3 | 6 | 2:00 PM | #1 Oregon vs #8 Arizona | P12N | 4,531 |
| 4 | 7 | 6:00 PM | #2 Stanford vs. #7 California | P12N | 4,489 |
| 4 | 8 | 8:30 PM | #3 Oregon State vs. #11 Washington | P12N | 4,489 |
Semifinals – Saturday, March 9
| 5 | 9 | 6:00 PM | #4 UCLA vs. #1 Oregon | P12N | 5,189 |
| 5 | 10 | 8:30 PM | #2 Stanford vs. #11 Washington | P12N | 5,189 |
Championship Game – Sunday, March 10
| 6 | 11 | 5:00 PM | #1 Oregon vs. #2 Stanford | ESPN2 | 5,023 |
*Game Times in PT.

== Bracket ==
First round Thursday, March 7 P12N
8 | Arizona | 76
9 | USC | 48
5 | Arizona State | 66
12 | Colorado | 49
7 | California | 77
10 | Washington State | 58
6 | Utah | 54
11 | Washington | 64

Quarterfinals; Friday, March 8 P12N
1 | #6 Oregon | 77
8 | Arizona | 63
4 | #25 UCLA | 73
5 | #20 Arizona State | 69
2 | #7 Stanford | 72
7 | California | 54
3 | #11 Oregon State | 67
11 | Washington | 68

Semifinals; Saturday, March 9 P12N
1 | #6 Oregon | 88*
4 | #25 UCLA | 83
2 | #7 Stanford | 72
11 | Washington | 61

Championship Game; Sunday, March 10; ESPN2
1 | #6 Oregon | 57
2 | #7 Stanford | 64

Note: * denotes overtime

=== All-Tournament Team ===
| Name | Pos. | Year | Team |
|---|---|---|---|
| Kennedy Burke | F | Sr. | UCLA |
| DiJonai Carrington | G | Jr. | Stanford |
| Japreece Dean | G | R-Jr. | UCLA |
| Ruthy Hebard | F | Jr. | Oregon |
| Sabrina Ionescu | G | Jr. | Oregon |
| Alanna Smith | F | Sr. | Stanford |

=== Most Outstanding Player ===
| Name | Pos. | Year | Team |
|---|---|---|---|
| Alanna Smith | F | Sr. | Stanford |

== See also ==
- 2019 Pac-12 Conference men's basketball tournament
