= 2018–19 Utah Utes women's basketball team =

Intercollegiate basketball season

2018–19 Utah Utes women's basketball

Duel in the Desert Rebel Division Champions
- Conference: Pac-12 Conference
- Record: 20–10 (9–9 Pac–12)
- Head coach: Lynne Roberts (4th season)
- Associate head coach: Gavin Petersen
- Assistant coaches: Danyelle Snelgro; Joanna Reitz
- Home arena: Jon M. Huntsman Center

2018–19 Pac-12 Conference women's basketball standings
	Conf.				Overall
Team	W		L	PCT	W		L	PCT
No. 7 Oregon	16	–	2	.889	33	–	5	.868
No. 6 Stanford †	15	–	3	.833	31	–	5	.861
No. 11 Oregon State	14	–	4	.778	26	–	8	.765
No. 20 UCLA	12	–	6	.667	22	–	13	.629
No. 22 Arizona State	10	–	7	.588	22	–	11	.667
Utah	9	–	9	.500	20	–	10	.667
California	9	–	9	.500	20	–	13	.606
Arizona	7	–	11	.389	24	–	13	.649
USC	7	–	11	.389	17	–	13	.567
Washington State	4	–	14	.222	9	–	21	.300
Washington	2	–	15	.118	11	–	21	.344
Colorado	2	–	16	.111	12	–	18	.400
† 2019 Pac-12 Tournament winner Rankings from AP Poll

The 2018–19 Utah Utes women's basketball team represented the University of Utah during the 2018–19 NCAA Division I women's basketball season. The Utes, led by fourth-year head coach Lynne Roberts, played their home games at the Jon M. Huntsman Center and were members of the Pac-12 Conference. They finished the season 20–10, 9–9 in Pac-12 play to finish in a tie for sixth place. They lost in the first round of the Pac-12 women's tournament to Washington. They would have clinched the automatic berth to the 2019 Women's National Invitation Tournament, but they declined to participate, despite having 20 wins.

== Roster ==
2018–19 Utah Utes women's basketball team
Players
Coaches

Pos.	#	Name	Height	Year	Previous school	Hometown
G	0	Kiana Moore	5 ft 7 in (1.7 m)	Jr	Vanden HS	Fairfield, CA
G/F	1	Jordan Cruz	5 ft 11 in (1.8 m)	RS Fr	C.K. McClatchy HS	Sacramento, CA
G	2	Julie Brosseau (redshirt)	5 ft 9 in (1.75 m)	Jr	Collège Montmorency; Maine	Repentigny, QC
G/F	3	Niyah Becker	6 ft 2 in (1.88 m)	Fr	Lincoln Prep	Winnipeg, MB
F	5	Megan Huff	6 ft 3 in (1.91 m)	RS Sr	Todd Beamer HS; Hawaii	Federal Way, WA
G	10	Dru Gylten	5 ft 11 in (1.8 m)	RS Fr	St. Thomas More HS	Rapid City, SD
G	11	Erika Bean	5 ft 8 in (1.73 m)	Sr	Bradshaw Christian HS	Sacramento, CA
F	12	Lola Pendande	6 ft 3 in (1.91 m)	Fr	Ribet Academy	Roquetas de Mar, Spain
F	14	Andreas Torres	6 ft 2 in (1.88 m)	Fr	Montmorency (CEGEP)	Montreal, QC
F	21	Maurane Corbin	6 ft 5 in (1.96 m)	So	Montmorency (CEGEP)	Saint-Bruno-de-Montarville, QC
G/F	23	Daneesha Provo	5 ft 11 in (1.8 m)	RS Sr	Kent School; Clemson	Dartmouth, NS
G	24	Sarah Porter	5 ft 10 in (1.78 m)	RS Sr	Horizon Christian Academy; UC Santa Barbara	San Diego, CA
G/F	35	Ola Makurat (redshirt)	6 ft 2 in (1.88 m)	Jr	Sport Championship School; Liberty	Sierakowice, Poland
G/F	44	Dre'una Edwards	6 ft 2 in (1.88 m)	Fr	Liberty HS	Las Vegas, NV

Head coach

- Lynne Roberts (Seattle Pacific)

Assistant coach(es)

- Gavin Petersen (Hawaiʻi)
- Danyelle Snelgro (Utah State)
- Joanna Reitz (Covenant)

Legend

- (C) Team captain
- (S) Suspended
- (I) Ineligible
- (W) Walk-on
- Injured
- Current redshirt

Roster

== Schedule and results ==
Date time, TV	Rank^{#}	Opponent^{#}	Result	Record	Site (attendance) city, state
Exhibition
10/31/2018*; 11:00 am		Westminster College	W 118–80		Jon M. Huntsman Center (5,009); Salt Lake City, UT
Non-conference regular season
11/07/2018*; 7:30 pm		at Nevada	W 74–52	1–0	Lawlor Events Center (1,227); Reno, NV
11/13/2018*; 7:00 pm		Alabama	W 72–62	2–0	Jon M. Huntsman Center (2,082); Salt Lake City, UT
11/16/2018*; 7:00 pm		Long Beach State	W 82–59	3–0	Jon M. Huntsman Center (2,475); Salt Lake City, UT
11/19/2018*; 7:00 pm		Idaho State	W 74–60	4–0	Jon M. Huntsman Center (1,749); Salt Lake City, UT
11/21/2018*; 5:05 pm		at Eastern Washington	W 95–51	5–0	Reese Court (231); Cheney, WA
11/26/2018*; 7:00 pm		Seattle	W 89–62	6–0	Jon M. Huntsman Center (1,572); Salt Lake City, UT
12/01/2018*; 5:30 pm, P12N		Utah Valley; Old Oquirrh Bucket	W 85–47	7–0	Jon M. Huntsman Center (2,299); Salt Lake City, UT
12/08/2018*; 7:00 pm, P12N		BYU; Rivalry/Old Oquirrh Bucket	W 78–67	8–0	Jon M. Huntsman Center (6,106); Salt Lake City, UT
12/15/2018*; 2:00 pm		Weber State; Old Oquirrh Bucket	W 77–56	9–0	Jon M. Huntsman Center (2,062); Salt Lake City, UT
12/20/2018*; 1:00 pm		vs. Florida; Duel in the Desert Rebel Division semifinals	W 74–58	10–0	Cox Pavilion; Paradise, NV
12/21/2018*; 3:30 pm		vs. Hawaii; Duel in the Desert Rebel Division championship game	W 73–48	11–0	Cox Pavilion (709); Paradise, NV
Pac-12 regular season
12/30/2018; 1:00 pm, P12N		at Colorado	W 76–61	12–0 (1–0)	CU Events Center (2,277); Boulder, CO
01/04/2019; 7:00 pm, P12N		No. 22 Arizona State	L 63–65	12–1 (1–1)	Jon M. Huntsman Center (3,310); Salt Lake City, UT
01/06/2019; 12:00 pm, P12N		Arizona	W 80–64	13–1 (2–1)	Jon M. Huntsman Center (2,089); Salt Lake City, UT
01/11/2019; 8:00 pm, P12N		at Washington State	W 72–68	14–1 (3–1)	Beasley Coliseum (555); Pullman, WA
01/13/2019; 3:00 pm, P12N		at Washington	W 58–43	15–1 (4–1)	Alaska Airlines Arena (2,250); Seattle, WA
01/18/2019; 7:00 pm, P12N		Colorado	W 78–59	16–1 (5–1)	Jon M. Huntsman Center (3,045); Salt Lake City, UT
01/25/2019; 7:00 pm, P12N	No. 21	California	W 87–74	17–1 (6–1)	Jon M. Huntsman Center (4,071); Salt Lake City, UT
01/27/2019; 12:00 pm	No. 21	No. 6 Stanford	W 75–68	18–1 (7–1)	Jon M. Huntsman Center (2,983); Salt Lake City, UT
02/01/2019; 8:00 pm, P12N	No. 14	at No. 4 Oregon	L 65–87	18–2 (7–2)	Matthew Knight Arena (7,773); Eugene, OR
02/03/2019; 1:00 pm	No. 14	at No. 9 Oregon State	L 63–71	18–3 (7–3)	Gill Coliseum (4,960); Corvallis, OR
02/08/2019; 7:00 pm, P12N	No. 17	USC	L 80–84	18–4 (7–4)	Jon M. Huntsman Center (4,003); Salt Lake City, UT
02/10/2019; 12:00 pm, P12N	No. 17	UCLA	L 90–100	18–5 (7–5)	Jon M. Huntsman Center (2,107); Salt Lake City, UT
02/15/2019; 6:00 pm, P12N		at Arizona	L 55–66	18–6 (7–6)	McKale Center (2,002); Tucson, AZ
02/17/2019; 2:00 pm, P12N		at No. 19 Arizona State	L 58–60	18–7 (7–7)	Wells Fargo Arena (2,316); Tempe, AZ
02/22/2019; 7:00 pm		Washington	W 88–56	19–7 (8–7)	Jon M. Huntsman Center (3,743); Salt Lake City, UT
02/24/2019; 12:00 pm		Washington State	W 75–67	20–7 (9–7)	Jon M. Huntsman Center (1,919); Salt Lake City, UT
03/01/2019; 8:00 pm		at No. 25 UCLA	L 60–76	20–8 (9–8)	Pauley Pavilion (1,450); Los Angeles, CA
03/03/2019; 1:00 pm, P12N		at USC	L 77–83 ^{OT}	20–9 (9–9)	Galen Center (2,786); Los Angeles, CA
Pac-12 Women's Tournament
03/07/2019; 9:30 pm, P12N	(6)	vs. (11) Washington; First Round	L 54–64	20–10	MGM Grand Garden Arena (3,168); Paradise, NV
*Non-conference game. ^{#}Rankings from AP Poll/Coaches' Poll. (#) Tournament seedings in parentheses. All times are in Mountain Time.

== Rankings ==
Regular season polls
Poll	Pre- season	Week 2	Week 3	Week 4	Week 5	Week 6	Week 7	Week 8	Week 9	Week 10	Week 11	Week 12	Week 13	Week 14	Week 15	Week 16	Week 17	Week 18	Week 19	Final
AP				RV	RV	RV	RV	RV	RV	RV	RV	21	14	17	RV					N/A
Coaches											RV	24	17	20	RV	RV	RV			

Legend
	Increase in ranking
	Decrease in ranking
	No change
(RV)	Received votes
(NR)	Not ranked

== See also ==
- 2018–19 Utah Utes men's basketball team
