= 2018–19 Oregon Ducks women's basketball team =

Intercollegiate basketball season

2018–19 Oregon Ducks women's basketball

Pac-12 regular season champions

NCAA tournament, Final Four
- Conference: Pac-12 Conference

Ranking
- Coaches: No. 4
- AP: No. 7
- Record: 33–5 (16–2 Pac-12)
- Head coach: Kelly Graves (5th season)
- Assistant coaches: Mark Campbell; Jodie Berry; Xavi López
- Home arena: Matthew Knight Arena

2018–19 Pac-12 Conference women's basketball standings
	Conf.				Overall
Team	W		L	PCT	W		L	PCT
No. 7 Oregon	16	–	2	.889	33	–	5	.868
No. 6 Stanford †	15	–	3	.833	31	–	5	.861
No. 11 Oregon State	14	–	4	.778	26	–	8	.765
No. 20 UCLA	12	–	6	.667	22	–	13	.629
No. 22 Arizona State	10	–	7	.588	22	–	11	.667
Utah	9	–	9	.500	20	–	10	.667
California	9	–	9	.500	20	–	13	.606
Arizona	7	–	11	.389	24	–	13	.649
USC	7	–	11	.389	17	–	13	.567
Washington State	4	–	14	.222	9	–	21	.300
Washington	2	–	15	.118	11	–	21	.344
Colorado	2	–	16	.111	12	–	18	.400
† 2019 Pac-12 Tournament winner Rankings from AP Poll

The 2018–19 Oregon Ducks women's basketball team represented the University of Oregon during the 2018–19 NCAA Division I women's basketball season. The Ducks, led by fifth-year head coach Kelly Graves, played their home games at the Matthew Knight Arena as members of the Pac-12 Conference. They finished the season 33–5, 16–2 in Pac-12 play to win the Pac-12 regular season title. They advanced to the championship game of the Pac-12 women's tournament, where they lost to Stanford. They received an at-large bid to the NCAA women's tournament, where they defeated Portland State and Indiana in the first and second rounds, South Dakota State in the Sweet Sixteen, and Mississippi State in the Elite Eight, to reach the Final Four for the first time in school history. They lost to Baylor in the Final Four.

== Offseason ==
=== Departures ===
Name	Number	Pos.	Height	Year	Hometown	Reason for departure
Justine Hall	3	Guard	5'10"	Senior	Denver, CO	Graduated
Lexi Bando	10	Guard	5'9"	Senior	Eugene, OR	Graduated
Anneli Maley	15	Guard	6'2"	Freshman	Melbourne, Australia	Transferred to TCU
Aina Ayuso	31	Guard	5'9"	Freshman	Sant Just Desvern, Spain	Left to play professionally
Mallory McGuire	44	Forward	6'5"	Sophomore	Reno, NV	Transferred to Boise State
Sierra Campisano	52	Forward	6'3"	Sophomore	San Diego, CA	Transferred to Cal Poly

=== Recruits ===
College recruiting
Name	Hometown	School	Height	Weight	Commit date
Taylor Chavez; G	Phoenix, AZ	Valley Vista HS	5 ft 10 in (1.78 m)	N/A	
Taylor Chavez; G	Recruit ratings: ESPN: (95)				
Nyara Sabally; F	Berlin, Germany	Rotteck Gymnasium	6 ft 4 in (1.93 m)	N/A	
Nyara Sabally; F	Recruit ratings: ESPN: (90)				
Overall recruit ranking:
Note: In many cases, Scout, Rivals, 247Sports, On3, and ESPN may conflict in their listings of height and weight.; In these cases, the average was taken. ESPN grades are on a 100-point scale.; Sources: "2018 Player Commits". ESPN. Archived from the original on October 24, 2019.

== Roster ==
2018–19 Oregon Ducks women's basketball team
Players
Coaches

Pos.	#	Name	Height	Year	Previous school	Hometown
F	0	Satou Sabally	6 ft 4 in (1.93 m)	So	Rotteck Gymnasium	Berlin, Germany
F	1	Nyara Sabally (injured) (redshirt)	6 ft 4 in (1.93 m)	Fr	Rotteck Gymnasium	Berlin, Germany
G	2	Morgan Yaeger	5 ft 9 in (1.75 m)	RS So	St. John's School	Adelaide, Australia
G	3	Taylor Chavez	5 ft 10 in (1.78 m)	Fr	Valley Vista	Surprise, AZ
G	5	Maite Cazorla	5 ft 10 in (1.78 m)	Sr	Segle XXI	Las Palmas, Spain
F	14	Lydia Giomi	6 ft 6 in (1.98 m)	RS So	West Seattle HS	Seattle, WA
G	20	Sabrina Ionescu	5 ft 11 in (1.8 m)	Jr	Miramonte HS	Walnut Creek, CA
F	21	Erin Boley	6 ft 2 in (1.88 m)	RS So	Elizabethtown HS; Notre Dame	Hodgenville, KY
F	24	Ruthy Hebard	6 ft 4 in (1.93 m)	Jr	West Valley HS	Fairbanks, AK
F	32	Oti Gildon	6 ft 1 in (1.85 m)	Sr	Gonzaga Prep	Spokane, WA

Head coach

- Kelly Graves (New Mexico)

Assistant coach(es)

- Mark Campbell (Hawaiʻi)
- Jodie Berry (Western Washington)
- Xavi López (Point Loma)

Legend

- (C) Team captain
- (S) Suspended
- (I) Ineligible
- (W) Walk-on
- Injured
- Current redshirt

Roster

== Schedule ==
Date time, TV	Rank^{#}	Opponent^{#}	Result	Record	Site (attendance) city, state
Exhibition
12/30/2018*; 2:00 pm	No. 5	Concordia (OR)	W 110–49		Matthew Knight Arena (4,819); Eugene, OR
Non-conference regular season
11/06/2018*; 8:00 pm	No. 3	at Alaska–Fairbanks	W 115–36	1–0	Patty Center (1,603); Fairbanks, AK
11/10/2018*; 2:00 pm	No. 3	No. 18 Syracuse	W 75–73	2–0	Matthew Knight Arena (6,879); Eugene, OR
11/14/2018*; 6:00 pm	No. 3	at Utah State	W 88–58	3–0	Smith Spectrum (718); Logan, UT
11/18/2018*; 2:00 pm	No. 3	Buffalo	W 102–82	4–0	Matthew Knight Arena (5,205); Eugene, OR
11/23/2018*; 12:00 pm	No. 3	vs. UC Riverside; Hilton Concord Classic	W 94–44	5–0	McKeon Pavilion (88); Moraga, CA
11/24/2018*; 2:00 pm	No. 3	at Saint Mary's; Hilton Concord Classic	W 79–55	6–0	McKeon Pavilion (963); Moraga, CA
12/02/2018*; 2:00 pm	No. 3	Long Beach State	W 110–48	7–0	Matthew Knight Arena (5,118); Eugene, OR
12/09/2018*; 12:00 pm, ESPN2	No. 3	at Michigan State	L 82–88	7–1	Breslin Center (6,462); East Lansing, MI
12/12/2018*; 5:00 pm	No. 7	at South Dakota State	W 87–79	8–1	Frost Arena (2,509); Brookings, SD
12/18/2018*; 7:00 pm, ESPN2	No. 7	No. 4 Mississippi State	W 82–74	9–1	Matthew Knight Arena (8,951); Eugene, OR
12/20/2018*; 11:00 am	No. 7	Air Force	W 82–36	10–1	Matthew Knight Arena (7,967); Eugene, OR
12/21/2018*; 12:00 pm	No. 7	UC Irvine	W 115–69	11–1	Matthew Knight Arena (4,772); Eugene, OR
Pac-12 regular season
01/04/2019; 6:00 pm, P12N	No. 5	Washington	W 84–71	12–1 (1–0)	Matthew Knight Arena (6,013); Eugene, OR
01/06/2019; 3:00 pm, P12N	No. 5	Washington State	W 98–58	13–1 (2–0)	Matthew Knight Arena (5,946); Eugene, OR
01/11/2019; 8:00 pm, P12N	No. 5	at USC	W 93–53	14–1 (3–0)	Galen Center (647); Los Angeles, CA
01/13/2019; 2:00 pm, P12N	No. 5	at UCLA	W 72–52	15–1 (4–0)	Pauley Pavilion (8,036); Los Angeles, CA
01/18/2019; 6:00 pm, P12N	No. 5	No. 19 Arizona State	W 77–71	16–1 (5–0)	Matthew Knight Arena (6,769); Eugene, OR
01/20/2019; 12:00 pm, P12N	No. 5	Arizona	W 93–60	17–1 (6–0)	Matthew Knight Arena (7,062); Eugene, OR
01/25/2019; 7:00 pm, P12N	No. 5	at Washington State	W 79–64	18–1 (7–0)	Beasley Coliseum (931); Pullman, WA
01/27/2019; 2:00 pm, P12N	No. 5	at Washington	W 76–57	19–1 (8–0)	Alaska Airlines Arena (4,295); Seattle, WA
02/01/2019; 7:00 pm, P12N	No. 4	No. 14 Utah	W 87–65	20–1 (9–0)	Matthew Knight Arena (7,773); Eugene, OR
02/03/2019; 12:00 pm	No. 4	Colorado	W 102–43	21–1 (10–0)	Matthew Knight Arena (6,350); Eugene, OR
02/08/2019; 8:00 pm, P12N	No. 3	at California	W 105–82	22–1 (11–0)	Haas Pavilion (2,719); Berkeley, CA
02/10/2019; 1:00 pm, ESPN2	No. 3	at No. 11 Stanford	W 88–48	23–1 (12–0)	Maples Pavilion (5,250); Stanford, CA
02/15/2019; 6:00 pm, P12N	No. 3	No. 9 Oregon State; Civil War	W 77–68	24–1 (13–0)	Matthew Knight Arena (12,364); Eugene, OR
02/18/2019; 6:00 pm, ESPN2	No. 2	at No. 12 Oregon State; Civil War	L 62–67	24–2 (13–1)	Gill Coliseum (9,301); Corvallis, OR
02/22/2019; 8:00 pm, P12N	No. 2	UCLA	L 69–74	24–3 (13–2)	Matthew Knight Arena (8,858); Eugene, OR
02/24/2019; 11:00 am, P12N	No. 2	USC	W 96–78	25–3 (14–2)	Matthew Knight Arena (8,232); Eugene, OR
03/01/2019; 7:00 pm, P12N	No. 6	at Arizona	W 83–54	26–3 (15–2)	McKale Center (2,517); Tucson, AZ
03/03/2019; 12:00 pm, P12N	No. 6	at No. 21 Arizona State	W 66–59	27–3 (16–2)	Wells Fargo Arena (4,033); Tempe, AZ
Pac-12 Women's Tournament
03/08/2019; 2:30 pm, P12N	(1) No. 6	vs. (8) Arizona; Quarterfinals	W 77–63	28–3	MGM Grand Garden Arena (4,531); Paradise, NV
03/09/2019; 6:00 pm, P12N	(1) No. 6	vs. (4) No. 25 UCLA; Semifinals	W 88–83 ^{OT}	29–3	MGM Grand Garden Arena; Paradise, NV
03/10/2019; 5:00 pm, ESPN2	(1) No. 6	vs. (2) No. 7 Stanford; Championship Game	L 57–64	29–4	MGM Grand Garden Arena (5,023); Paradise, NV
NCAA Women's Tournament
03/22/2019*; 6:30 pm, ESPN2	(2 P) No. 7	(15 P) Portland State; First Round	W 78–40	30–4	Matthew Knight Arena (6,523); Eugene, OR
03/24/2019*; 6:00 pm, ESPN2	(2 P) No. 7	(10 P) Indiana; Second Round	W 91–68	31–4	Matthew Knight Arena (6,729); Eugene, OR
03/29/2019*; 8:30 pm, ESPN2	(2 P) No. 7	vs. (6 P) South Dakota State; Sweet Sixteen	W 63–53	32–4	Moda Center (11,324); Portland, OR
03/31/2019*; 11:00 am, ESPN	(2 P) No. 7	vs. (1 P) No. 4 Mississippi State; Elite Eight	W 88–84	33–4	Moda Center (11,538); Portland, OR
04/05/2019*; 4:00 pm, ESPN2	(2 P) No. 7	vs. (1 G) No. 1 Baylor; Final Four	L 67–72	33–5	Amalie Arena (20,062); Tampa, FL
*Non-conference game. ^{#}Rankings from AP Poll. (#) Tournament seedings in parentheses. P=Portland Region. All times are in Pacific Time.

== Rankings ==
Regular season polls
Poll	Pre- season	Week 2	Week 3	Week 4	Week 5	Week 6	Week 7	Week 8	Week 9	Week 10	Week 11	Week 12	Week 13	Week 14	Week 15	Week 16	Week 17	Week 18	Week 19	Final
AP	3	3 (1)	3	3	3	7	7	5	5	5	5	5	4	3	3 (3)	2 (2)	6	6	7	N/A
Coaches	3	3^	3	3	3	7	7	5	5	5	5	5	4 (1)	3 (1)	3 (3)	3	6	6	7	4

Legend
	Increase in ranking
	Decrease in ranking
	Not ranked previous week
RV	Received votes
NR	Not ranked
( )	First place votes received

^Coaches did not release a Week 2 poll.

== See also ==
- 2018–19 Oregon Ducks men's basketball team
