= Rancho Campana High School =

Public high school in California, United States

Location
- 4235 Mar Vista Dr; Camarillo, California 93010; United States; 34°14′40″N 119°0′50″W

Information
- Type: Public
- School district: Oxnard Union High School District
- Principal: Jason Meskis
- Teaching staff: 33.91 (FTE)
- Enrollment: 845 (2023–2024)
- Student to teacher ratio: 24.92
- Website: www.ranchocampanahigh.us

Rancho Campana High School is an 800 student comprehensive academy high school for grades 9-12 that was built in 2015. It is located in Camarillo, California, United States, and is part of the Oxnard Union High School District. The 28-acre site (11 ha) provides public education for the Camarillo, Somis, Ventura, and Oxnard communities.

The high school divides students in their freshman year into three academies: Academy of Engineering, Academy of Arts, and Academy of Medical Sciences. Each academy provides specific course requirements, field trips, educational and job shadow opportunities. Due to a limited amount of space on the campus, as well as limited resources and technology, the 200 incoming freshmen are determined through a lottery each year.

The first graduating class was in June 2018, when 130 students graduated.

The school received funding in 2018 for updating facilities through a local bond measure. It also received funds to expand its student capacity with relocatable classrooms.

The name "Rancho Campana" is derived from the Spanish translation of the previous occupant of the land, the "Bell Ranch" farm.

== Academies ==
The Academy of Engineering is divided into the Traditional Engineering and Computer Science pathways.

The Academy of Arts is divided into the three pathways of Commercial Photography, Video and Film, and Theater Arts.

The Academy of Health Sciences currently has just one pathways in Patient Care, however they also originally were also going to have a Mental Health pathway.

== Performing Arts Center ==
Along with the school, a multi-million dollar Performing Arts Center (PAC) was also constructed at the site. At 27,500 square feet with a seating capacity of up to 695, the Rancho Campana PAC is the largest theater venue in the city of Camarillo. It is currently staffed and managed by the student-led organization RCMakes, who provide maintenance, student stagehands, and technical theater support for the large orchestras, local dance groups, and school plays which are hosted at the venue.

The Rancho Campana PAC was still in construction when the school opened in 2015, and did not officially open until May of 2016.
