= 2018–19 Oregon State Beavers women's basketball team =

Intercollegiate basketball season

2018–19 Oregon State Beavers women's basketball

NCAA tournament, Sweet Sixteen
- Conference: Pac-12 Conference

Ranking
- Coaches: No. 10
- AP: No. 11
- Record: 26–8 (14–4 Pac-12)
- Head coach: Scott Rueck (9th season)
- Associate head coach: Jonas Chatterton
- Assistant coaches: Brian Holsinger; Katie Baker
- Home arena: Gill Coliseum

2018–19 Pac-12 Conference women's basketball standings
	Conf.				Overall
Team	W		L	PCT	W		L	PCT
No. 7 Oregon	16	–	2	.889	33	–	5	.868
No. 6 Stanford †	15	–	3	.833	31	–	5	.861
No. 11 Oregon State	14	–	4	.778	26	–	8	.765
No. 20 UCLA	12	–	6	.667	22	–	13	.629
No. 22 Arizona State	10	–	7	.588	22	–	11	.667
Utah	9	–	9	.500	20	–	10	.667
California	9	–	9	.500	20	–	13	.606
Arizona	7	–	11	.389	24	–	13	.649
USC	7	–	11	.389	17	–	13	.567
Washington State	4	–	14	.222	9	–	21	.300
Washington	2	–	15	.118	11	–	21	.344
Colorado	2	–	16	.111	12	–	18	.400
† 2019 Pac-12 Tournament winner Rankings from AP Poll

The 2018–19 Oregon State Beavers women's basketball team represented Oregon State University during the 2018–19 NCAA Division I women's basketball season. The Beavers, led by ninth year head coach Scott Rueck, played their games at the Gill Coliseum and were members of the Pac-12 Conference. They finished the season with a record of 26-8 (14-4 Pac-12). They played in the quarterfinals of the Pac-12 Women's Tournament where they were upset by Washington. They received an at-large bid to the NCAA Women's Tournament where they defeated Boise State in the first round, and Gonzaga in the second round, before losing to Louisville for the 2nd consecutive year in the Sweet 16.

== Roster ==
2018–19 Oregon State Beavers women's basketball team
Players
Coaches

Pos.	#	Name	Height	Year	Previous school	Hometown
G	0	Mikayla Pivec	5 ft 10 in (1.78 m)	Jr	Lynnwood HS	Lynnwood, WA
G	1	Aleah Goodman	5 ft 9 in (1.75 m)	So	La Salle HS	Milwaukie, OR
F	2	Andrea Aquino	6 ft 9 in (2.06 m)	Fr	Ribet Academy	Caacupé, Paraguay
G/F	3	Madison Washington	6 ft 1 in (1.85 m)	Jr	Bishop Gorman HS	Las Vegas, NV
F	5	Taya Corosdale	6 ft 3 in (1.91 m)	So	Bothell HS	Bothell, WA
G	10	Katie McWilliams	6 ft 2 in (1.88 m)	Sr	South Salem HS	Salem, OR
C	11	Joanna Grymek	6 ft 8 in (2.03 m)	Sr	Seward CC	Kraków, Poland
F	13	Janessa Thropay	6 ft 2 in (1.88 m)	Jr	Chino HS	Chino, CA
G	22	Kat Tudor	6 ft 0 in (1.83 m)	Jr	St. Mary's HS	Stockton, CA
G	24	Destiny Slocum	5 ft 7 in (1.7 m)	RS So	Mountain View HS; Maryland	Meridian, ID
F	32	Patricia Morris	6 ft 7 in (2.01 m)	Fr	Duarte HS	Duarte, CA
G	43	Jasmine Simmons	5 ft 11 in (1.8 m)	Fr	Australian Institute of Sport	Mildura, Australia

Head coach

- Scott Rueck (Oregon State)

Assistant coach(es)

- Jonas Chatterton (Utah)
- Brian Holsinger (Western Washington)
- Katie Baker (Montana)

Legend

- (C) Team captain
- (S) Suspended
- (I) Ineligible
- (W) Walk-on
- Injured
- Current redshirt

Roster

== Schedule ==
Date time, TV	Rank^{#}	Opponent^{#}	Result	Record	Site (attendance) city, state
Exhibition
11/03/2018*; 11:00 am	No. 8	Northwest Nazarene	W 95–58		Gill Coliseum; Corvallis, OR
Non-conference regular season
11/09/2018*; 7:00 pm	No. 8	Cal Poly	W 79–54	1–0	Gill Coliseum (4,468); Corvallis, OR
11/14/2018*; 11:00 am	No. 8	Arkansas–Pine Bluff	W 89–33	2–0	Gill Coliseum (8,828); Corvallis, OR
11/17/2018*; 6:00 pm	No. 8	Saint Mary's	W 89–56	3–0	Gill Coliseum (4,329); Corvallis, OR
11/22/2018*; 8:30 pm	No. 9	vs. Western Kentucky; Vancouver Showcase Quarterfinals	W 74–60	4–0	Vancouver Convention Centre (296); Vancouver, BC
11/23/2018*; 8:30 pm	No. 9	vs. No. 13 South Carolina; Vancouver Showcase Semifinals	W 70–68	5–0	Vancouver Convention Centre (1,156); Vancouver, BC
11/24/2018*; 5:00 pm	No. 9	vs. No. 1 Notre Dame; Vancouver Showcase Championship	L 81–91	5–1	Vancouver Convention Centre (1,866); Vancouver, BC
12/01/2018*; 12:00 pm, P12N	No. 9	La Salle	W 100–46	6–1	Gill Coliseum (4,016); Corvallis, OR
12/09/2018*; 2:00 pm	No. 8	Santa Clara	W 82–31	7–1	Gill Coliseum (4,015); Corvallis, OR
12/14/2018*; 9:30 pm	No. 8	vs. Eastern Washington; Maui Jim Maui Classic	W 93–45	8–1	Lahaina Civic Center (1,112); Lahaina, HI
12/15/2018*; 9:30 pm	No. 8	vs. Texas A&M; Maui Jim Maui Classic	L 70–76	8–2	Lahaina Civic Center (1,083); Lahaina, HI
12/20/2018*; 7:00 pm, P12N	No. 11	Duke	W 71–57	9–2	Gill Coliseum (7,060); Corvallis, OR
12/29/2018*; 2:00 pm	No. 11	Cal State Bakersfield	W 92–52	10–2	Gill Coliseum (4,393); Corvallis, OR
Pac-12 regular season
01/05/2019; 7:00 pm, P12N	No. 11	Washington State	W 76–69	11–2 (1–0)	Gill Coliseum (4,733); Corvallis, OR
01/06/2019; 2:00 pm	No. 11	Washington	W 78–67	12–2 (2–0)	Gill Coliseum (4,854); Corvallis, OR
01/11/2019; 7:00 pm, P12N	No. 10	at UCLA	W 83–73	13–2 (3–0)	Pauley Pavilion (2,404); Los Angeles, CA
01/13/2019; 12:00 pm, P12N	No. 10	at USC	W 76–52	14–2 (4–0)	Galen Center (641); Los Angeles, CA
01/18/2019; 7:00 pm	No. 10	Arizona	W 86–64	15–2 (5–0)	Gill Coliseum (5,061); Corvallis, OR
01/20/2019; 2:00 pm, P12N	No. 10	No. 19 Arizona State	L 76–79 ^{2OT}	15–3 (5–1)	Gill Coliseum (5,690); Corvallis, OR
01/25/2019; 8:00 pm, P12N	No. 9	at Washington	W 86–39	16–3 (6–1)	Alaska Airlines Arena (1,887); Seattle, WA
01/27/2019; 12:00 pm, P12N	No. 9	at Washington State	W 52–35	17–3 (7–1)	Beasley Coliseum (1,043); Pullman, WA
02/01/2019; 7:00 pm, P12N	No. 9	Colorado	W 89–65	18–3 (8–1)	Gill Coliseum (4,600); Corvallis, OR
02/03/2019; 12:00 pm, P12N	No. 9	No. 14 Utah	W 71–63	19–3 (9–1)	Gill Coliseum (4,960); Corvallis, OR
02/08/2019; 6:00 pm, P12N	No. 7	at No. 11 Stanford	L 44–61	19–4 (9–2)	Maples Pavilion (2,840); Stanford, CA
02/10/2019; 1:00 pm, P12N	No. 7	at California	W 82–74	20–4 (10–2)	Haas Pavilion (3,220); Berkeley, CA
02/15/2019; 6:00 pm, P12N	No. 9	at No. 3 Oregon; Civil War	L 68–77	20–5 (10–3)	Matthew Knight Arena (12,364); Eugene, OR
02/18/2019; 6:00 pm, ESPN2	No. 12	No. 2 Oregon; Civil War	W 67–62	21–5 (11–3)	Gill Coliseum (9,301); Corvallis, OR
02/22/2019; 6:00 pm, P12N	No. 12	USC	W 68–61	22–5 (12–3)	Gill Coliseum (5,084); Corvallis, OR
02/24/2019; 1:00 pm, P12N	No. 12	UCLA	W 75–72	23–5 (13–3)	Gill Coliseum (5,916); Corvallis, OR
03/01/2019; 5:00 pm, P12N	No. 9	at No. 21 Arizona State	L 54–66	23–6 (13–4)	Wells Fargo Arena (3,176); Tempe, AZ
03/03/2019; 2:00 pm, P12N	No. 9	at Arizona	W 65–60 ^{2OT}	24–6 (14–4)	McKale Center (2,119); Tucson, AZ
Pac-12 Women's Tournament
03/08/2019; 8:30 pm, P12N	(3) No. 11	vs. (11) Washington; Quarterfinals	L 67–68	24–7	MGM Grand Garden Arena (4,489); Paradise, NV
NCAA Women's Tournament
03/23/2019*; 3:00 pm, ESPN2	(4 A) No. 11	(13 A) Boise State; First Round	W 80–75 ^{OT}	25–7	Gill Coliseum (5,089); Corvallis, OR
03/25/2019*; 6:00 pm, ESPN	(4 A) No. 11	(5 A) No. 16 Gonzaga; Second Round	W 76–70	26–7	Gill Coliseum (5,478); Corvallis, OR
03/29/2019*; 6:30 pm, ESPN	(4 A) No. 11	vs. (1 A) No. 5 Louisville; Sweet Sixteen	L 44–61	26–8	Times Union Center (8,765); Albany, NY
*Non-conference game. ^{#}Rankings from AP Poll. (#) Tournament seedings in parentheses. A=Albany Region. All times are in Pacific Time.

== Rankings ==
2018–19 NCAA Division I women's basketball rankings

Regular season polls
Poll	Pre- Season	Week 2	Week 3	Week 4	Week 5	Week 6	Week 7	Week 8	Week 9	Week 10	Week 11	Week 12	Week 13	Week 14	Week 15	Week 16	Week 17	Week 18	Week 19	Final
AP	8	8	9	9	8	8	11	11	11	10	10	9	9	7	9	12	9	11	11	N/A
Coaches	9	9^	8	9	8	8	11	11	11	10	10	11	11	10	9	8	8	9	12	10

Legend
	Increase in ranking
	Decrease in ranking
	Not ranked previous week
(RV)	Received Votes
(NR)	Not Ranked

^Coaches did not release a Week 2 poll.

== See also ==
- 2018–19 Oregon State Beavers men's basketball team
