= 2018–19 Stanford Cardinal women's basketball team =

Intercollegiate basketball season

2018–19 Stanford Cardinal women's basketball

Rainbow Wahine Shootout champions Pac-12 Tournament champions

NCAA tournament, Elite Eight
- Conference: Pac-12 Conference

Ranking
- Coaches: No. 7
- AP: No. 6
- Record: 31–5 (15–3 Pac-12)
- Head coach: Tara VanDerveer (33rd season)
- Associate head coach: Kate Paye (12th season)
- Assistant coaches: Tempie Brown (6th season); Lindy La Rocque (2nd season)
- Home arena: Maples Pavilion

2018–19 Pac-12 Conference women's basketball standings
| | Conf. | | | | Overall |
| Team | W | | L | PCT | W | | L | PCT |
|---|---|---|---|---|---|---|---|---|
| No. 7 Oregon | 16 | – | 2 | .889 | 33 | – | 5 | .868 |
| No. 6 Stanford † | 15 | – | 3 | .833 | 31 | – | 5 | .861 |
| No. 11 Oregon State | 14 | – | 4 | .778 | 26 | – | 8 | .765 |
| No. 20 UCLA | 12 | – | 6 | .667 | 22 | – | 13 | .629 |
| No. 22 Arizona State | 10 | – | 7 | .588 | 22 | – | 11 | .667 |
| Utah | 9 | – | 9 | .500 | 20 | – | 10 | .667 |
| California | 9 | – | 9 | .500 | 20 | – | 13 | .606 |
| Arizona | 7 | – | 11 | .389 | 24 | – | 13 | .649 |
| USC | 7 | – | 11 | .389 | 17 | – | 13 | .567 |
| Washington State | 4 | – | 14 | .222 | 9 | – | 21 | .300 |
| Washington | 2 | – | 15 | .118 | 11 | – | 21 | .344 |
| Colorado | 2 | – | 16 | .111 | 12 | – | 18 | .400 |
† 2019 Pac-12 Tournament winner Rankings from AP Poll

The 2018–19 Stanford Cardinal women's basketball team represented Stanford University during the 2018–19 NCAA Division I women's basketball season. The Cardinal, led by thirty-third year head coach Tara VanDerveer, played their home games at the Maples Pavilion and are members of the Pac-12 Conference. They finished the season 31–5, 15–3 in Pac-12 play to finish in second place. They won the Pac-12 women's tournament by defeating Oregon and earned an automatic the NCAA women's tournament. They defeated UC Davis and BYU in the first and second rounds, Missouri State in the sweet sixteen before losing to Notre Dame in the elite eight.

== Roster ==
2018–19 Stanford Cardinal women's basketball team
Players
Coaches

| Pos. | # | Name | Height | Year | Previous school | Hometown |
|---|---|---|---|---|---|---|
| C | 2 | Shannon Coffee | 6 ft 5 in (1.96 m) | Sr | Centerville | Dayton, OH |
| G | 3 | Anna Wilson | 5 ft 9 in (1.75 m) | Jr | Bellevue | Bellevue, WA |
| F | 4 | Nadia Fingall | 6 ft 3 in (1.91 m) | Jr | Choctawhatchee | Navarre, FL |
| F | 10 | Alyssa Jerome | 6 ft 2 in (1.88 m) | So | Harbord Collegiate | Toronto, ON |
| F | 11 | Alanna Smith | 6 ft 3 in (1.91 m) | Sr | Wesley College | Melbourne, Australia |
| F | 12 | Lexie Hull | 6 ft 2 in (1.88 m) | Fr | Central Valley | Spokane, WA |
| G | 13 | Marta Sniezek | 5 ft 8 in (1.73 m) | Sr | National Cathedral | McLean, VA |
| G | 14 | Mikaela Brewer | 5 ft 8 in (1.73 m) | Jr | Innisdale Secondary School | Barrie, ON |
| F | 15 | Maya Dodson | 6 ft 3 in (1.91 m) | So | St. Francis | Alpharetta, GA |
| F | 20 | Estella Moschkau | 6 ft 1 in (1.85 m) | So | Edgewood | Madison, WI |
| G | 21 | DiJonai Carrington | 5 ft 11 in (1.8 m) | Jr | Horizon Christian Academy | San Diego, CA |
| G | 22 | Alexa Romano | 5 ft 10 in (1.78 m) | Sr | La Cueva | Albuquerque, NM |
| G | 23 | Kiana Williams | 5 ft 8 in (1.73 m) | So | Karen Wagner | San Antonio, TX |
| F | 24 | Lacie Hull | 6 ft 2 in (1.88 m) | Fr | Central Valley | Spokane, WA |
| G | 54 | Jenna Brown | 5 ft 10 in (1.78 m) | Fr | The Lovett School | Atlanta, GA |

Head coach

- Tara VanDerveer (Indiana)

Assistant coach(es)

- Lindy La Rocque (Stanford)
- Tempie Brown (Michigan)
- Kate Paye (Stanford)

Legend

- (C) Team captain
- (S) Suspended
- (I) Ineligible
- (W) Walk-on
- Injured
- Current redshirt

Roster

== Schedule ==
| Date time, TV | Rank^{#} | Opponent^{#} | Result | Record | Site (attendance) city, state |
Exhibition
| 11/01/2018*; 7:00 pm | No. 7 | Vanguard | W 87–36 | | Maples Pavilion (1,882); Stanford, CA |
Non-conference regular season
| 11/07/2018*; 7:00 pm | No. 7 | UC Davis | W 71–43 | 1–0 | Maples Pavilion (2,471); Stanford, CA |
| 11/11/2018*; 2:00 pm | No. 7 | Idaho | W 115–71 | 2–0 | Maples Pavilion (2,582); Stanford, CA |
| 11/15/2018*; 7:00 pm | No. 7 | San Francisco | W 96–62 | 3–0 | Maples Pavilion (2,077); Stanford, CA |
| 11/18/2018*; 1:00 pm, P12N | No. 7 | Ohio State | Cancelled | | Maples Pavilion; Stanford, CA |
| 11/23/2018*; 6:30 pm | No. 8 | vs. Florida Gulf Coast; Rainbow Wahine Shootout | W 88–65 | 4–0 | Stan Sheriff Center; Honolulu, HI |
| 11/24/2018*; 2:00 pm | No. 8 | vs. American; Rainbow Wahine Shootout | W 71–49 | 5–0 | Stan Sheriff Center; Honolulu, HI |
| 11/25/2018*; 4:30 pm | No. 8 | at Hawaii; Rainbow Wahine Shootout | W 81–59 | 6–0 | Stan Sheriff Center (1,383); Honolulu, HI |
| 12/02/2018*; 2:00 pm | No. 8 | at Gonzaga | L 73–79 | 6–1 | McCarthey Athletic Center (6,000); Spokane, WA |
| 12/15/2018*; 12:00 pm, P12N | No. 11 | No. 3 Baylor | W 68–63 | 7–1 | Maples Pavilion (3,440); Stanford, CA |
| 12/18/2018*; 3:00 pm, SECN | No. 8 | at No. 9 Tennessee; Rivalry | W 95–85 | 8–1 | Thompson–Boling Arena (8,051); Knoxville, TN |
| 12/21/2018*; 9:00 am, ESPN+ | No. 8 | at Buffalo | W 62–55 | 9–1 | Alumni Arena (3,412); Amherst, NY |
| 12/29/2018*; 2:00 pm | No. 6 | Cal State Northridge | W 69–43 | 10–1 | Maples Pavilion (2,520); Stanford, CA |
Pac-12 regular season
| 01/04/2019; 8:00 pm, P12N | No. 6 | USC | W 72–64 | 11–1 (1–0) | Maples Pavilion (2,557); Stanford, CA |
| 01/06/2019; 1:00 pm, P12N | No. 6 | UCLA | W 86–80 | 12–1 (2–0) | Maples Pavilion (3,231); Stanford, CA |
| 01/11/2019; 6:00 pm, P12N | No. 6 | at No. 19 Arizona State | W 72–65 | 13–1 (3–0) | Wells Fargo Arena (2,728); Tempe, AZ |
| 01/13/2019; 11:00 am, P12N | No. 6 | at Arizona | W 78–48 | 14–1 (4–0) | McKale Center (2,686); Tucson, AZ |
| 01/18/2019; 7:00 pm, P12N | No. 6 | Washington | W 91–54 | 15–1 (5–0) | Maples Pavilion (2,535); Stanford, CA |
| 01/20/2019; 12:00 pm, P12N | No. 6 | Washington State | W 85–64 | 16–1 (6–0) | Maples Pavilion (2,908); Stanford, CA |
| 01/25/2019; 6:00 pm, P12N | No. 6 | at Colorado | W 80–69 | 17–1 (7–0) | CU Events Center (2,373); Boulder, CO |
| 01/27/2019; 11:00 am | No. 6 | at No. 21 Utah | L 68–75 | 17–2 (7–1) | Jon M. Huntsman Center (2,983); Salt Lake City, UT |
| 01/31/2019; 8:00 pm, P12N | No. 8 | at California | L 80–81 | 17–3 (7–2) | Haas Pavilion (3,117); Berkeley, CA |
| 02/02/2019; 4:00 pm, P12N | No. 8 | California | W 75–50 | 18–3 (8–2) | Maples Pavilion (4,066); Stanford, CA |
| 02/08/2019; 6:00 pm, P12N | No. 11 | No. 7 Oregon State | W 61–44 | 19–3 (9–2) | Maples Pavilion (2,840); Stanford, CA |
| 02/10/2019; 1:00 pm, ESPN2 | No. 11 | No. 3 Oregon | L 48–88 | 19–4 (9–3) | Maples Pavilion (5,250); Stanford, CA |
| 02/15/2019; 6:00 pm, P12N | No. 10 | at UCLA | W 65–51 | 20–4 (10–3) | Pauley Pavilion (2,479); Los Angeles, CA |
| 02/17/2019; 12:00 pm, P12N | No. 10 | at USC | W 69–67 | 21–4 (11–3) | Galen Center (922); Los Angeles, CA |
| 02/22/2019; 7:00 pm | No. 7 | Arizona | W 56–54 | 22–4 (12–3) | Maples Pavilion (3,569); Stanford, CA |
| 02/24/2019; 1:00 pm, P12N | No. 7 | No. 17 Arizona State | W 71–50 | 23–4 (13–3) | Maples Pavilion (3,057); Stanford, CA |
| 03/01/2019; 7:00 pm, P12N | No. 7 | at Washington State | W 67–42 | 24–4 (14–3) | Beasley Coliseum (833); Pullman, WA |
| 03/03/2019; 2:00 pm, P12N | No. 7 | at Washington | W 72–53 | 25–4 (15–3) | Alaska Airlines Arena (2,760); Seattle, WA |
Pac-12 Women's Tournament
| 03/08/2019; 6:00 pm, P12N | (2) No. 7 | vs. (7) California; Quarterfinals | W 72–54 | 26–4 | MGM Grand Garden Arena (4,489); Paradise, NV |
| 03/09/2019; 8:30 pm, P12N | (2) No. 7 | vs. (11) Washington; Semifinals | W 72–61 | 27–4 | MGM Grand Garden Arena (5,189); Paradise, NV |
| 03/10/2019; 5:00 pm, ESPN2 | (2) No. 7 | vs. (1) No. 6 Oregon; Championship Game | W 64–57 | 28–4 | MGM Grand Garden Arena (5,023); Paradise, NV |
NCAA Women's Tournament
| 03/23/2019*; 3:00 pm, ESPN2 | (2 C) No. 7 | (15 C) UC Davis; First Round | W 79–54 | 29–4 | Maples Pavilion (3,456); Stanford, CA |
| 03/25/2019*; 8:00 pm, ESPN2 | (2 C) No. 7 | (7 C) BYU; Second Round | W 72–63 | 30–4 | Maples Pavilion (2,450); Stanford, CA |
| 03/30/2019*; 3:30 pm, ESPN2 | (2 C) No. 7 | vs. (11 C) Missouri State; Sweet Sixteen | W 55–46 | 31–4 | Wintrust Arena (7,714); Chicago, IL |
| 04/01/2019*; 6:00 pm, ESPN2 | (2 C) No. 7 | vs. (1 C) No. 3 Notre Dame; Elite Eight | L 68–84 | 31–5 | Wintrust Arena (5,555); Chicago, IL |
*Non-conference game. ^{#}Rankings from AP Poll. (#) Tournament seedings in parentheses. C=Chicago Region. All times are in Pacific Time.

- The game between Stanford and Ohio State had been originally scheduled for November 18, 2018, but was cancelled due to wildfires.

== Rankings ==
2018–19 NCAA Division I women's basketball rankings

Regular season polls
| Poll | Pre- Season | Week 2 | Week 3 | Week 4 | Week 5 | Week 6 | Week 7 | Week 8 | Week 9 | Week 10 | Week 11 | Week 12 | Week 13 | Week 14 | Week 15 | Week 16 | Week 17 | Week 18 | Week 19 | Final |
|---|---|---|---|---|---|---|---|---|---|---|---|---|---|---|---|---|---|---|---|---|
| AP | 7 | 7 | 8 | 8 | 11 | 11 | 8 | 6 | 6 | 6 | 6 | 6 | 8 | 11 | 10 | 7 | 7 | 7 | 6 | N/A |
| Coaches | 7 | 7^ | 7 | 7 | 11 | 11 | 9 | 8 | 8 | 7 | 7 | 7 | 8 | 11 | 10 | 7 | 7 | 7 | 6 | 7 |

Legend
| | Increase in ranking |
| | Decrease in ranking |
| | Not ranked previous week |
| (RV) | Received Votes |
| (NR) | Not Ranked |

^Coaches did not release a Week 2 poll.

== See also ==
2018–19 Stanford Cardinal men's basketball team
