= 2018–19 Auburn Tigers women's basketball team =

Intercollegiate basketball season

2018–19 Auburn Tigers women's basketball

Carolinas Challenge Champions

NCAA Women's Tournament, first round
- Conference: Southeastern Conference
- Record: 22–10 (9–7 SEC)
- Head coach: Terri Williams-Flournoy (7th season)
- Assistant coaches: Ty Evans; Adrian Walters; Clarisse Garcia
- Home arena: Auburn Arena

2018–19 SEC women's basketball standings
	Conf.				Overall
Team	W		L	PCT	W		L	PCT
No. 4 Mississippi State †	15	–	1	.938	33	–	3	.917
No. 15 South Carolina	13	–	3	.813	23	–	9	.719
No. 14 Texas A&M	12	–	4	.750	26	–	7	.788
No. 17 Kentucky	11	–	5	.688	25	–	8	.758
Missouri	10	–	6	.625	24	–	11	.686
Auburn	9	–	7	.563	22	–	10	.688
Georgia	9	–	7	.563	18	–	12	.600
Tennessee	7	–	9	.438	19	–	13	.594
LSU	7	–	9	.438	16	–	13	.552
Arkansas	6	–	10	.375	22	–	15	.595
Alabama	5	–	11	.313	14	–	17	.452
Ole Miss	3	–	13	.188	9	–	22	.290
Florida	3	–	13	.188	8	–	23	.258
Vanderbilt	2	–	14	.125	7	–	23	.233
† 2019 SEC tournament winner Rankings from AP poll

The 2018–19 Auburn Tigers women's basketball team represented Auburn University during the 2018–19 NCAA Division I women's basketball season. The Tigers, led by seventh-year head coach Terri Williams-Flournoy, played their home games at Auburn Arena as members of the Southeastern Conference. They finished the season 22–10, 9–7 in SEC play to finish in a tie for sixth place. They advanced to the quarterfinals of the SEC women's tournament, where they lost to Texas A&M. They received an at-large bid to the NCAA women's tournament, where they lost to BYU in the first round.

== Previous season ==
They finished the 2017–18 season 14–15, 5–11 in SEC play to finish in tenth place. They lost in the second round of the SEC women's tournament to Tennessee.

== Roster ==
2018–19 Auburn Tigers women's basketball team
Players
Coaches

Pos.	#	Name	Height	Year	Previous school	Hometown
G	0	Daisa Alexander	5 ft 8 in (1.73 m)	Jr	Southwest DeKalb HS	Decatur, GA
G	1	Robyn Benton	5 ft 9 in (1.75 m)	Fr	Greater Atlanta Christian	Conyers, GA
G	2	Brooke Moore	5 ft 7 in (1.7 m)	Fr	Episcopal HS	Baton Rouge, LA
G	3	Erica Sanders	5 ft 10 in (1.78 m)	Sr	Johnson HS	San Antonio, TX
F	4	Abigayle Jackson	6 ft 3 in (1.91 m)	So	Little Rock Central HS	Little Rock, AR
G	5	Emari Jones	5 ft 10 in (1.78 m)	Sr	Wheaton North; Shawnee CC	Chicago, IL
F	10	Kiyae' White	6 ft 2 in (1.88 m)	RS Fr	Emmaus HS	Macungie, PA
F	20	Unique Thompson	6 ft 3 in (1.91 m)	So	Faith Academy	Theodore, AL
G	23	Crystal Primm	5 ft 11 in (1.8 m)	RS Jr	Oxbridge Academy; Duke	West Palm Beach, FL
G/F	24	Erin Howard	6 ft 1 in (1.85 m)	Fr	Madison East HS	Madison, WI
G	33	Janiah McKay	5 ft 6 in (1.68 m)	Jr	Gainesville HS	Gainesville, FL
F	35	Natalie Kelly	6 ft 3 in (1.91 m)	Fr	Albany HS	Albany, LA

Head coach

- Terri Williams-Flournoy (Penn State)

Assistant coach(es)

- Ty Evans (UW–Whitewater)
- Adrian Walters (Saint Francis (PA))
- Clarisse Garcia (Villanova)

Legend

- (C) Team captain
- (S) Suspended
- (I) Ineligible
- (W) Walk-on
- Injured
- Current redshirt

Roster
Last update: September 19, 2018

== Schedule ==
Date time, TV	Rank^{#}	Opponent^{#}	Result	Record	Site (attendance) city, state
Non-conference regular season
11/06/2018*; 5:30 pm		Grambling State	W 97–48	1–0	Auburn Arena (1,657); Auburn, AL
11/09/2018*; 6:00 pm		Nicholls; Preseason WNIT First Round	W 80–59	2–0	Auburn Arena (2,316); Auburn, AL
11/11/2018*; 3:00 pm		at New Mexico; Preseason WNIT Quarterfinals	W 79–76	3–0	Dreamstyle Arena (4,419); Albuquerque, NM
11/13/2018*; 6:30 pm		at Iowa State; Preseason WNIT Semifinals	L 64–67	3–1	Hilton Coliseum (9,274); Ames, IA
11/25/2018*; 2:00 pm		Louisiana	W 71–59	4–1	Auburn Arena (1,488); Auburn, AL
11/28/2018*; 6:00 pm		at Xavier (LA)	W 77–58	5–1	Convocation Center (201); New Orleans, LA
12/02/2018*; 2:00 pm, SECN		Oklahoma; Big 12/SEC Women's Challenge	W 95–79	6–1	Auburn Arena (1,877); Auburn, AL
12/06/2018*; 6:00 pm, ESPN+		at Saint Joseph's	W 81–70	7–1	Hagan Arena (443); Philadelphia, PA
12/16/2018*; 2:00 pm		Samford	W 73–46	8–1	Auburn Arena (1,675); Auburn, AL
12/18/2018*; 5:30 pm		vs. Coastal Carolina; Carolinas Challenge	W 84–78	9–1	Myrtle Beach Convention Center; Myrtle Beach, SC
12/20/2018*; 5:30 pm		vs. North Carolina; Carolinas Challenge	W 86–81 ^{OT}	10–1	Myrtle Beach Convention Center; Myrtle Beach, SC
12/22/2018*; 1:00 pm		at Elon	W 96–44	11–1	Schar Center (368); Elon, NC
12/29/2018*; 12:00 pm		Alabama State	W 83–50	12–1	Auburn Arena (1,868); Auburn, AL
SEC regular season
01/03/2019; 6:00 pm		No. 10 Tennessee	L 69–78	12–2 (0–1)	Auburn Arena (2,204); Auburn, AL
01/06/2019; 12:00 pm, SECN		at Florida	W 64–56	13–2 (1–1)	O'Connell Center (2,109); Gainesville, FL
01/10/2019; 7:00 pm		at Alabama	W 66–56	14–2 (2–1)	Coleman Coliseum (2,575); Tuscaloosa, AL
01/14/2019; 6:00 pm, SECN		No. 7 Mississippi State	L 59–85	14–3 (2–2)	Auburn Arena (1,908); Auburn, AL
01/17/2019; 7:00 pm		at Vanderbilt	W 72–70	15–3 (3–2)	Memorial Gymnasium (1,835); Nashville, TN
01/24/2019; 7:30 pm, SECN		No. 24 Texas A&M	L 67–69	15–4 (3–3)	Auburn Arena (1,656); Auburn, AL
01/27/2019; 2:00 pm		at No. 25 Missouri	L 65–74	15–5 (3–4)	Mizzou Arena (5,119); Columbia, MO
01/31/2019; 7:00 pm		at Ole Miss	W 64–51	16–5 (4–4)	The Pavilion at Ole Miss (1,296); Oxford, MS
02/03/2019; 2:00 pm, SECN		Georgia	W 59–58 ^{OT}	17–5 (5–4)	Auburn Arena (2,170); Auburn, AL
02/07/2019; 6:00 pm		Kentucky	L 68–78	17–6 (5–5)	Auburn Arena (1,604); Auburn, AL
02/10/2019; 1:00 pm, SECN		at Arkansas	W 75–72	18–6 (6–5)	Bud Walton Arena (2,455); Fayetteville, AR
02/14/2019; 2:00 pm		at Tennessee	L 62–73	18–7 (6–6)	Thompson–Boling Arena (7,547); Knoxville, TN
02/17/2019; 3:00 pm, SECN		Alabama	W 77–38	19–7 (7–6)	Auburn Arena (2,631); Auburn, AL
02/24/2019; 2:00 pm		Missouri	W 58–54	20–7 (8–6)	Auburn Arena (2,293); Auburn, AL
02/28/2019; 6:00 pm		No. 14 South Carolina	L 66–73	20–8 (8–7)	Auburn Arena (1,912); Auburn, AL
03/03/2019; 2:00 pm		at LSU	W 56–46	21–8 (9–7)	Maravich Center (2,607); Baton Rouge, LA
SEC Women's Tournament
03/07/2019; 7:30 pm, SECN	(6)	vs. (11) Alabama; Second Round	W 53–52	22–8	Bon Secours Wellness Arena (3,089); Greenville, SC
03/08/2019; 7:30 pm, SECN	(6)	vs. (3) No. 15 Texas A&M; Quarterfinals	L 62–64	22–9	Bon Secours Wellness Arena (5,709); Greenville, SC
NCAA Women's Tournament
03/23/2019*; 2:30 pm, ESPN2	(10 C)	vs. (7 C) BYU; First Round	L 64–73	22–10	Maples Pavilion; Stanford, CA
*Non-conference game. ^{#}Rankings from AP Poll. (#) Tournament seedings in parentheses. C=Chicago Region. All times are in Central Time.

== Rankings ==
2018–19 NCAA Division I women's basketball rankings

Regular season polls
Poll	Pre- Season	Week 2	Week 3	Week 4	Week 5	Week 6	Week 7	Week 8	Week 9	Week 10	Week 11	Week 12	Week 13	Week 14	Week 15	Week 16	Week 17	Week 18	Week 19	Final
AP									RV		RV									N/A
Coaches																				

Legend
	Increase in ranking
	Decrease in ranking
	No change
(RV)	Received votes
(NR)	Not ranked
