= 2018–19 Southeastern Conference women's basketball season =

2018–19 SEC women's basketball season
- League: NCAA Division I
- Sport: Basketball
- Teams: 14

WNBA Draft

Regular Season
- 2019 SEC Champions: Mississippi State
- Season MVP: Teaira McCowan, Mississippi State

Tournament

Basketball seasons
- ← 2017–18 2019–20 →

2018–19 SEC women's basketball standings
	Conf.				Overall
Team	W		L	PCT	W		L	PCT
No. 4 Mississippi State †	15	–	1	.938	33	–	3	.917
No. 15 South Carolina	13	–	3	.813	23	–	9	.719
No. 14 Texas A&M	12	–	4	.750	26	–	7	.788
No. 17 Kentucky	11	–	5	.688	25	–	8	.758
Missouri	10	–	6	.625	24	–	11	.686
Auburn	9	–	7	.563	22	–	10	.688
Georgia	9	–	7	.563	18	–	12	.600
Tennessee	7	–	9	.438	19	–	13	.594
LSU	7	–	9	.438	16	–	13	.552
Arkansas	6	–	10	.375	22	–	15	.595
Alabama	5	–	11	.313	14	–	17	.452
Ole Miss	3	–	13	.188	9	–	22	.290
Florida	3	–	13	.188	8	–	23	.258
Vanderbilt	2	–	14	.125	7	–	23	.233
† 2019 SEC tournament winner Rankings from AP poll

The 2018–19 SEC women's basketball season began with practices in October 2018, followed by the start of the 2018–19 NCAA Division I women's basketball season in November. Conference play started in early January 2019 and concluded in February, followed by the 2019 SEC women's basketball tournament at the Bon Secours Wellness Arena in Greenville, South Carolina, in March.

== Pre-season ==
=== Pre-season team predictions ===
	Media	Coaches
1.	Mississippi State	
2.	South Carolina	
3.	Tennessee	Georgia
4.	Georgia	Tennessee
5.	Missouri	
6.	Texas A&M	
7.	Kentucky	
8.	Auburn	
9.	LSU	
10.	Alabama	
11.	Arkansas	
12.	Florida	
13.	Vanderbilt	
14.	Ole Miss	

=== Pre-season All-SEC teams ===
Media	Coaches
**Teiera McCowan Mississippi State**	**McCowan**
Caliya Robinson Georgia	Robinson
Anriel Howard Mississippi State	Howard
Sophie Cunningham Missouri	Cunningham
Rennia Davis Tennessee	Davis
Chennedy Carter Texas A&M	Carter
Alexis Jennings South Carolina	Tyasha Harris South Carolina
	Maci Morris Kentucky

- Coaches select eight players
- Players in bold are choices for SEC Player of the Year

== Head coaches ==
Note: Stats shown are before the beginning of the season. Overall and SEC records are from time at current school.

Team	Head coach	Previous job	Seasons at school	Overall record	SEC record	NCAA tournaments	NCAA Final Fours	NCAA championships
Alabama	Kristy Curry	Texas Tech	6th	84–79	71–74	9	1	0
Arkansas	Mike Neighbors	Washington	2nd	13–18	3–13	3	1	0
Auburn	Terri Williams-Flournoy	Georgetown	7th	102–91	35–63	4	0	0
Florida	Cameron Newbauer	Belmont	2nd	11–19	3–13	2	0	0
Georgia	Joni Taylor	Georgia (ass't)	4th	63–32	28–20	2	0	0
Kentucky	Matthew Mitchell	Morehead State	12th	256–117	108–64	8	0	0
LSU	Nikki Fargas	UCLA	8th	132–93	59–51	8	0	0
Mississippi State	Vic Schaefer	Sam Houston State	7th	161–53	61–35	4	2	0
Missouri	Robin Pingeton	Illinois State	9th	147–108	47–45	5	0	0
Ole Miss	Yolett McPhee-McCuin	Jacksonville	1st	–	–	0	0	0
South Carolina	Dawn Staley	Temple	11th	250–87	109–49	13	2	1
Tennessee	Holly Warlick	Tennessee (ass't)	7th	153–54	71–25	6	0	0
Texas A&M	Gary Blair	Arkansas	16th	758–314	62–32	24	2	1
Vanderbilt	Stephanie White	Indiana	3rd	21–40	11–36	0	0	0

== Weekly rankings ==
Legend: ██ Increase in ranking. ██ Decrease in ranking. ██ Not ranked the previous week. RV=Received votes. NR=No rank/vote.
		Pre	Wk 2	Wk 3	Wk 4	Wk 5	Wk 6	Wk 7	Wk 8	Wk 9	Wk 10	Wk 11	Wk 12	Wk 13	Wk 14	Wk 15	Wk 16	Wk 17	Wk 18	Final
Alabama	AP	NR																		
Alabama	C	NR																		
Arkansas	AP	NR																		
Arkansas	C	NR										RV	RV	NR						
Auburn	AP	NR								RV	NR	RV	NR							
Auburn	C	NR																		
Florida	AP	NR																		
Florida	C	NR																		
Georgia	AP	14	14	RV	RV	RV	RV	RV	NR			RV	NR							
Georgia	C	13	24	RV	NR															
Kentucky	AP	NR	NR	NR	25	19	18	18	18	16	16	16	15	19	19	17	16	11	13	18
Kentucky	C	NR	RV	25	19	20	18	17	15	16	15	12	15	17	18	17				
LSU	AP	NR	NR	NR	RV	NR														
LSU	C	NR																		
Mississippi State	AP	6	6	6	6	6	5	4	8	7	7	7	7	6	6	5	6	5	5	4
Mississippi State	C	6	6	6	6	5	4	7	6	6	5	5	5	5	5	6				
Missouri	AP	16	16	21	RV	23	22	RV	NR	RV	RV	RV	25	RV	RV	RV	RV			
Missouri	C	14	18	RV	25	24	RV	RV	RV	RV	RV	RV	RV	RV	RV	25				
Ole Miss	AP	NR																		
Ole Miss	C	NR																		
South Carolina	AP	10	10	13	18	22	25	25	25	23	21	15	19	16	12	11	13	14	12	16
South Carolina	C	11	12	19	24	RV	RV	RV	RV	25	20	20	18	13	14	13				
Tennessee	AP	11	12	11	11	9	9	9	10	10	13	20	RV	NR						
Tennessee	C	12	11	11	9	9	8	10	10	13	17	RV	NR							
Texas A&M	AP	20	20	20	17	RV	RV	23	23	21	RV	RV	24	20	18	22	21	19	15	17
Texas A&M	C	22	21	16	RV	RV	24	24	21	RV	RV	25	24	22	23	22				
Vanderbilt	AP	NR																		
Vanderbilt	C	NR																		

== Regular season matrix ==
	Alabama	Arkansas	Auburn	Florida	Georgia	Kentucky	LSU	Miss. State	Missouri	Ole Miss	S. Carolina	Tennessee	Texas A&M	Vanderbilt
vs. Alabama	–	1-0	2-0	1–1	0–1	1-0	1–0	1–0	1–0	0–1	1–0	0–1	1–0	0–1
vs. Arkansas	0–1	–	1-0	0–1	2–0	1-0	1–0	1–0	2–0	0–2	1–0	0–1	1–0	0–1
vs. Auburn	0-2	0–1	–	0–1	0–1	1-0	0–1	1–0	1–0	0–1	1–0	2–0	1–0	0–1
vs. Florida	1-1	1–0	1–0	–	1–0	1-0	1–0	1–0	0–1	1–0	2–0	1–0	1–0	0–1
vs. Georgia	1-1	0–2	1–0	0–2	–	1-1	0–1	1–0	1–0	0–1	1–0	0–1	1–0	0–1
vs. Kentucky	0-1	0–1	0–1	0–1	0–1	–	0–2	1–0	0–1	1–0	1–1	0–1	2–0	0–1
vs. LSU	0-1	0–1	1–0	0–1	1–0	2–0	–	2–0	0–1	0–1	1–0	1–0	1–1	0–1
vs. Miss. State	0-1	0–1	0–1	0–1	0–1	0–1	0–2	–	1–0	0–2	0–2	0–1	0–1	0–0
vs. Missouri	0-1	0–2	1–1	1–0	0–1	1–0	1–0	0–1	–	0–1	1–0	1–1	0–1	0–1
vs. Ole Miss	1-0	2–0	1–0	0–1	1–0	0–1	1–0	2–0	1-0	–	1–0	1–0	1–0	1–1
vs. South Carolina	0-1	0–1	0–1	0–2	0–1	1–1	0–1	2–0	0-1	0–1	–	0–1	0–1	0–1
vs. Tennessee	1-0	1–0	0–2	0–1	1–0	1–0	0–1	1–0	1-1	0–1	1–0	–	1–0	1–1
vs. Texas A&M	0-1	0–1	0–1	0–1	0–1	0–2	1–1	1–0	1-0	0–1	1–0	0–1	–	0–2
vs. Vanderbilt	1-0	1–0	1–0	1–0	1–0	1–0	1–0	1–0	1-0	1–1	1–0	1–1	2-0	–
Total	5–11	6–10	9–7	3–13	9–7	11–5	7–9	15–1	10–6	3–13	13–3	7–9	12–4	2–13

== Postseason ==
=== SEC tournament ===
- March 6–10 at the Bon Secours Wellness Arena in Greenville, South Carolina. Teams were seeded by conference record, with ties broken by record between the tied teams followed by record against the regular-season champion.

**2019 SEC women's basketball tournament seeds and results**
Seed	School	Conf.	Over.	Tiebreaker	First round March 6	Second round March 7	Quarterfinals March 8	Semifinals March 9	Championship March 10
1	‡†**Mississippi State**	15–1	30–2		Bye	Bye	vs. #8 Tennessee; **W, 83–68**	vs. #5 Missouri; **W, 71–56**	vs. #10 Arkansas; **W, 101–70**
2	†**South Carolina**	13–3	21–9		Bye	Bye	vs. #10 Arkansas; **L, 89–95**		
3	†**Texas A&M**	12–4	24–7		Bye	Bye	vs. #6 Auburn; **W, 64–62**	vs. #10 Arkansas; **L, 51–58**	
4	†**Kentucky**	12–5	24–7		Bye	Bye	vs. #5 Missouri; **L, 68–70 (OT)**		
5	#**Missouri**	11–6	23–10		Bye	vs. #13 Florida; **W, 87–56**	vs. #4 Kentucky; **W, 70–68 (OT)**	vs. #1 Mississippi State; **L, 56–71**	
6	#**Auburn**	10–7	22–9	1–0 vs. UGA	Bye	vs. #11 Alabama; **W, 53–52**	vs. #6 Texas A&M; **L, 62–64**		
7	#**Georgia**	9–8	18–12	0–1 vs. AUB	Bye	vs. #10 Arkansas; **L, 76–86**			
8	#**Tennessee**	8–9	19–12	1–0 vs. LSU	Bye	vs. #9 LSU; **W, 69–66**	vs. #1 Mississippi State; **L, 68–83**		
9	#**LSU**	7–10	16–13	0–1 vs. TENN	Bye	vs. #8 Tennessee; **L, 66–69**			
10	#**Arkansas**	7–10	20–14		Bye	vs. #7 Georgia; **W, 86–76**	vs. #2 South Carolina; **W, 95–89**	vs. #3 Texas A&M; **W, 58–51**	vs. #1 Mississippi State; **L, 70–101**
11	**Alabama**	5–12	14–17		vs. #14 Vanderbilt; **W, 74–57**	vs. #6 Auburn; **L, 52–53**			
12	**Ole Miss**	3–13	9–22	1–0 vs. UF	vs. #13 Florida; **L, 57–64**				
13	**Florida**	3–14	8–23	0–1 vs. MISS	vs. #12 Ole Miss; **W, 64–57**	vs. #5 Missouri; **L, 56–87**			
14	**Vanderbilt**	2–14	7–23		vs. #11 Alabama; **L, 57–74**				
‡ – SEC regular-season champions, and tournament No. 1 seed † – Received a double bye in the conference tournament # – Received a single bye in the conference tournament Overall records include all games played in the tournament.

=== NCAA Division I women's basketball tournament ===
Seed	Bracket	School	First round	Second round	Sweet 16	Elite 8
1	Portland	Mississippi State	vs. #16 Southern; **W, 103–46**	vs. #9 Clemson; **W, 85–61**	vs. #5 Arizona State; **W, 76–53**	vs. #2 Oregon; **L, 84–88**
4	Chicago	Texas A&M	vs. #11 Wright State; **W, 84–61**	vs. #5 Marquette; **W, 78–76**	vs. #1 Notre Dame; **L, 80–87**	
4	Greensboro	South Carolina	vs. #13 Belmont; **W, 74–52**	vs. #5 Florida State; **W, 72–64**	vs. #1 Baylor; **L, 68–93**	
6	Greensboro	Kentucky	vs. #11 Princeton; **W, 82–77**	vs. #3 NC State; **L, 57–72**		
7	Greensboro	Missouri	vs. #10 Drake; **W, 77–76 (OT)**	vs. #2 Iowa; **L, 52–68**		
10	Chicago	Auburn	vs. #7 BYU; **L, 64–73**			
11	Albany	Tennessee	vs. #6 UCLA; **W, 77–89**			
**# Bids: 7**	W-L (%):	TOTAL: 9–7 (.563)	5–2 (.714)	3–2 (.600)	1–2 (.333)	0–1 (.000)

=== Women's National Invitation Tournament ===
School	First round	Second round	Third round
Arkansas (2–1)	vs. Houston; **W, 88–80 (OT)**	vs. UAB; **W, 100–52**	vs. TCU; **L, 78–82**

== WNBA draft ==
Player	Team	Round	Pick #	School
Teaira McCowan	Indiana Fever	1	3	Mississippi State
Sophie Cunningham	Phoenix Mercury	2	13	Missouri
Anriel Howard	Seattle Storm	2	24	Mississippi State
Caliya Robinson	Indiana Fever	3	28	Georgia
