= 2018–19 Vanderbilt Commodores women's basketball team =

Intercollegiate basketball season

2018–19 Vanderbilt Commodores women's basketball
- Conference: Southeastern Conference
- Record: 7–23 (2–14 SEC)
- Head coach: Stephanie White (3rd season)
- Assistant coaches: Carolyn Peck; Shereka Wright; Kelly Komara
- Home arena: Memorial Gymnasium

2018–19 SEC women's basketball standings
	Conf.				Overall
Team	W		L	PCT	W		L	PCT
No. 4 Mississippi State †	15	–	1	.938	33	–	3	.917
No. 15 South Carolina	13	–	3	.813	23	–	9	.719
No. 14 Texas A&M	12	–	4	.750	26	–	7	.788
No. 17 Kentucky	11	–	5	.688	25	–	8	.758
Missouri	10	–	6	.625	24	–	11	.686
Auburn	9	–	7	.563	22	–	10	.688
Georgia	9	–	7	.563	18	–	12	.600
Tennessee	7	–	9	.438	19	–	13	.594
LSU	7	–	9	.438	16	–	13	.552
Arkansas	6	–	10	.375	22	–	15	.595
Alabama	5	–	11	.313	14	–	17	.452
Ole Miss	3	–	13	.188	9	–	22	.290
Florida	3	–	13	.188	8	–	23	.258
Vanderbilt	2	–	14	.125	7	–	23	.233
† 2019 SEC tournament winner Rankings from AP poll

The 2018–19 Vanderbilt Commodores women's basketball team represented Vanderbilt University in the 2018–19 NCAA Division I women's basketball season. The Commodores, led by third-year head coach Stephanie White, played their home games at Memorial Gymnasium and were members of the Southeastern Conference. They finished the season 7–23, 2–14 in SEC play to finish in last place. They lost in the first round of the SEC women's tournament to Alabama.

== Previous season ==
They finished the 2017–18 season 7–24, 3–13 in SEC play to finish in a three-way tie for 11th place. They lost in the first round of the SEC women's tournament to Arkansas.

== Roster ==
2018–19 Vanderbilt Commodores women's basketball team
Players
Coaches

Pos.	#	Name	Height	Year	Previous school	Hometown
G	2	Chelsie Hall	5 ft 7 in (1.7 m)	So	Seffner Christian	Boca Raton, FL
G	3	Jordyn Cambridge	5 ft 9 in (1.75 m)	Fr	Ensworth	Nashville, TN
G	10	Cierra Walker	5 ft 8 in (1.73 m)	Jr	Oregon City	Oregon City, OR
G	15	Brinae Alexander	5 ft 9 in (1.75 m)	Fr	Riverdale	Murfreesboro, TN
C	22	Bree Horrocks	6 ft 5 in (1.96 m)	RS Sr	Purdue	Buford, GA
G	23	Isabella Paldrmic	5 ft 11 in (1.8 m)	Fr	Stevenson	Lincolnshire, IL
F	24	Autumn Newby	6 ft 2 in (1.88 m)	So	Archer	Lawrenceville, GA
G	30	LeaLea Carter	5 ft 11 in (1.8 m)	Jr	Dickson County	Dickson, TN
F	34	Mariella Fasoula	6 ft 5 in (1.96 m)	RS Jr	Boston College	Athens, Greece
G	35	Kaleigh Clemons-Green	5 ft 7 in (1.7 m)	Jr	Baylor School	Chattanooga, TN

Head coach

- Stephanie White (Purdue)

Assistant coach(es)

- Carolyn Peck (Vanderbilt)
- Shereka Wright (Purdue)
- Kelly Komara (Purdue)

Legend

- (C) Team captain
- (S) Suspended
- (I) Ineligible
- (W) Walk-on
- Injured
- Current redshirt

Roster
Last update: September 23, 2018

== Schedule ==
Date time, TV	Rank^{#}	Opponent^{#}	Result	Record	Site (attendance) city, state
Exhibition
10/28/2018*; 2:00 pm		Indianapolis	W 90–60		Memorial Gymnasium (1,784); Nashville, TN
Non-conference regular season
11/06/2018*; 6:00 pm		North Alabama	L 71–74	0–1	Memorial Gymnasium (1,946); Nashville, TN
11/09/2018*; 6:30 pm		at Middle Tennessee	L 58–65	0–2	Murphy Center (7,842); Murfreesboro, TN
11/12/2018*; 7:00 pm		Austin Peay	W 99–70	1–2	Memorial Gymnasium (1,820); Nashville, TN
11/15/2018*; 6:00 pm		at No. 17 NC State	L 54–74	1–3	Reynolds Coliseum (2,372); Raleigh, NC
11/17/2018*; 5:00 pm, SNY/ESPN3		vs. No. 2 UConn; Hall of Fame Holiday Showcase	L 42–80	1–4	Mohegan Sun Arena (7,375); Uncasville, CT
11/21/2018*; 12:00 pm		Tennessee State	W 89–63	2–4	Memorial Gymnasium (1,947); Nashville, TN
11/25/2018*; 2:00 pm		Presbyterian	W 78–43	3–4	Memorial Gymnasium (1,845); Nashville, TN
12/02/2018*; 1:00 pm, ESPN3		at Kansas State; Big 12/SEC Women's Challenge	L 61–72	3–5	Bramlage Coliseum (3,130); Manhattan, KS
12/06/2018*; 6:00 pm		at Ball State	W 60–43	4–5	Worthen Arena (923); Muncie, IN
12/15/2018*; 5:00 pm		Central Michigan	L 57–66	4–6	Memorial Gymnasium (2,064); Nashville, TN
12/20/2018*; 7:30 pm		vs. No. 24 Miami (FL); Florida Sunshine Classic	L 65–90	4–7	Warden Arena (397); Winter Garden, FL
12/21/2018*; 7:30 pm		vs. Creighton; Florida Sunshine Classic	L 55–75	4–8	Warden Arena (365); Winter Garden, FL
12/28/2018*; 7:00 pm		Samford	W 77–52	5–8	Memorial Gymnasium (2,604); Nashville, TN
SEC regular season
01/03/2019; 6:00 pm		at No. 16 Kentucky	L 55–77	5–9 (0–1)	Memorial Coliseum (4,030); Lexington, KY
01/06/2019; 2:00 pm		Georgia	L 64–71	5–10 (0–2)	Memorial Gymnasium (2,094); Nashville, TN
01/10/2019; 7:00 pm		Texas A&M	L 43–50	5–11 (0–3)	Memorial Gymnasium (1,839); Nashville, TN
01/13/2019; 2:00 pm		at Arkansas	L 62–83	5–12 (0–4)	Bud Walton Arena (1,553); Fayetteville, AR
01/17/2019; 7:00 pm		Auburn	L 70–72	5–13 (0–5)	Memorial Gymnasium (1,835); Nashville, TN
01/24/2019; 7:00 pm		Ole Miss	W 80–68	6–13 (1–5)	Memorial Gymnasium (2,162); Nashville, TN
01/28/2019; 6:00 pm, SECN		at No. 16 South Carolina	L 69–80	6–14 (1–6)	Colonial Life Arena (11,166); Columbia, SC
01/31/2019; 7:30 pm, SECN		at No. 20 Texas A&M	L 53–69	6–15 (1–7)	Reed Arena (3,757); College Station, TX
02/03/2019; 2:00 pm, ESPN2		Tennessee; Rivalry	L 65–82	6–16 (1–8)	Memorial Gymnasium (3,815); Nashville, TN
02/10/2019; 3:00 pm, SECN		at Missouri	L 46–69	6–17 (1–9)	Mizzou Arena (4,857); Columbia, MO
02/14/2019; 6:00 pm		at Ole Miss	L 60–65	6–18 (1–10)	The Pavilion at Ole Miss (1,311); Oxford, MS
02/17/2019; 5:00 pm, SECN		LSU	L 68–79	6–19 (1–11)	Memorial Gymnasium (2,907); Nashville, TN
02/21/2019; 7:00 pm		Alabama	L 65–84	6–20 (1–12)	Memorial Gymnasium (3,567); Nashville, TN
02/24/2019; 2:00 pm, SECN		at No. 6 Mississippi State	L 70–86	6–21 (1–13)	Humphrey Coliseum (9,566); Starkville, MS
02/28/2019; 6:00 pm, SECN		at Tennessee; Rivalry	W 76–69	7–21 (2–13)	Thompson–Boling Arena (7,321); Knoxville, TN
03/03/2019; 2:00 pm, SECN		Florida	L 66–78	7–22 (2–14)	Memorial Gymnasium (2,684); Nashville, TN
SEC Tournament
03/06/2019; 12:30 pm, SECN	(14)	vs. (11) Alabama; First Round	L 57–74	7–23	Bon Secours Wellness Arena (4,148); Greenville, SC
*Non-conference game. ^{#}Rankings from AP Poll. (#) Tournament seedings in parentheses. All times are in Central Time.

== See also ==
- 2018–19 Vanderbilt Commodores men's basketball team
