= 2018–19 Ole Miss Rebels women's basketball team =

Intercollegiate basketball season

2018–19 Ole Miss Rebels women's basketball
- Conference: Southeastern Conference
- Record: 9–22 (3–13 SEC)
- Head coach: Yolett McPhee-McCuin (1st season)
- Assistant coaches: Chris Ayers; Tony Greene; Armintie Herrington
- Home arena: The Pavilion at Ole Miss

2018–19 SEC women's basketball standings
	Conf.				Overall
Team	W		L	PCT	W		L	PCT
No. 4 Mississippi State †	15	–	1	.938	33	–	3	.917
No. 15 South Carolina	13	–	3	.813	23	–	9	.719
No. 14 Texas A&M	12	–	4	.750	26	–	7	.788
No. 17 Kentucky	11	–	5	.688	25	–	8	.758
Missouri	10	–	6	.625	24	–	11	.686
Auburn	9	–	7	.563	22	–	10	.688
Georgia	9	–	7	.563	18	–	12	.600
Tennessee	7	–	9	.438	19	–	13	.594
LSU	7	–	9	.438	16	–	13	.552
Arkansas	6	–	10	.375	22	–	15	.595
Alabama	5	–	11	.313	14	–	17	.452
Ole Miss	3	–	13	.188	9	–	22	.290
Florida	3	–	13	.188	8	–	23	.258
Vanderbilt	2	–	14	.125	7	–	23	.233
† 2019 SEC tournament winner Rankings from AP poll

The 2018–19 Ole Miss Rebels women's basketball team represented the University of Mississippi during the 2018–19 NCAA Division I women's basketball season. The Rebels, led by first-year head coach Yolett McPhee-McCuin, played their home games at the Pavilion at Ole Miss and competed as members of the Southeastern Conference (SEC). They finished the season 9–22, 3–13 in SEC play to finish in a tie for twelfth place. They lost in the first round of the SEC women's tournament to Florida.

== Previous season ==
The Rebels finished the season with a 12–19 overall record and a 1–15 record in conference play. One day after ending their season with a loss to Missouri in the second round of the SEC Tournament, fifth-year head coach Matt Insell was fired. One month later, McPhee-McCuin was hired to replace him.

== Roster ==
2018–19 Ole Miss Rebels women's basketball team
Players
Coaches

Pos.	#	Name	Height	Year	Previous school	Hometown
F	0	Gabby Crawford	6 ft 2 in (1.88 m)	Fr	Munford HS	Munford, TN
G	2	Mimi Reid	5 ft 8 in (1.73 m)	RS Fr	The Patrick School	Bronx, NY
F	3	Jhileiya Dunlap	6 ft 2 in (1.88 m)	Jr	Gulf Coast State CC	Columbia, SC
G	5	Crystal Allen	5 ft 9 in (1.75 m)	RS Sr	UT Arlington	Fort Worth, TX
F	10	Cecilia Muhate	6 ft 2 in (1.88 m)	Sr	Arturo Soria	Madrid, Spain
F	20	Mahogany Matthews	6 ft 1 in (1.85 m)	Fr	Hoke County HS	Raeford, NC
G	21	Taylor Smith	5 ft 8 in (1.73 m)	Fr	Marietta HS	Marietta, GA
G	23	Shandricka Sessom	5 ft 10 in (1.78 m)	RS Sr	Byhalia HS	Byhalia, MS
G	24	Shannon Dozier	5 ft 10 in (1.78 m)	Jr	Odessa	Washington, D.C.
G	31	Deja Cage (redshirt)	5 ft 8 in (1.73 m)	Jr	Morgan Park; DePaul	Chicago, IL
F	32	Iyanla Kitchens	6 ft 2 in (1.88 m)	Fr	Arabia Mountain HS	Lithonia, GA
F	33	La'Karis Salter	6 ft 1 in (1.85 m)	RS Sr	FAMU DRS; Jacksonville	Tallahassee, FL
G	44	Torri Lewis	5 ft 11 in (1.8 m)	Sr	Homeschool	Olive Branch, MS

Head coach

- Yolett McPhee-McCuin (Rhode Island)

Assistant coach(es)

- Chris Ayers (Florida A&M)
- Tony Greene (Langston)
- Armintie Herrington (Mississippi)

Legend

- (C) Team captain
- (S) Suspended
- (I) Ineligible
- (W) Walk-on
- Injured
- Current redshirt

Roster
Last update: September 22, 2018

== Schedule ==
Date time, TV	Rank^{#}	Opponent^{#}	Result	Record	High points	High rebounds	High assists	Site (attendance) city, state
Exhibition
11/02/2018*; 3:00 pm		LeMoyne–Owen	W 73–45		–	–	–	The Pavilion at Ole Miss; Oxford, MS
Non-conference regular season
11/06/2018*; 6:00 pm		Norfolk State	W 60–42	1–0	16 – Allen	10 – Dunlap	6 – Reid	The Pavilion at Ole Miss (1,407); Oxford, MS
11/09/2018*; 7:00 pm		IUPUI	L 58–66	1–1	21 – Allen	5 – Tied	5 – Dunlap	The Pavilion at Ole Miss (1,356); Oxford, MS
11/14/2018*; 6:00 pm		Temple	W 62–55	2–1	16 – Allen	6 – Sessom	5 – Tied	The Pavilion at Ole Miss (1,269); Oxford, MS
11/18/2018*; 2:00 pm		Western Michigan	W 69–66	3–1	19 – Allen	12 – Salter	5 – Reid	The Pavilion at Ole Miss (1,311); Oxford, MS
11/22/2018*; 6:30 pm		vs. No. 2 UConn; Paradise Jam tournament Reef Division	L 50–90	3–2	11 – Tied	6 – Tied	4 – Salter	Sports and Fitness Center (2,162); Saint Thomas, USVI
11/23/2018*; 4:30 pm		vs. Purdue; Paradise Jam Tournament Reef Division	L 59–70	3–3	13 – Allen	9 – Salter	3 – Tied	Sports and Fitness Center (2,373); Saint Thomas, USVI
11/24/2018*; 4:30 pm		vs. St. John's; Paradise Jam Tournament Reef Division	L 59–64	3–4	26 – Allen	7 – Tied	6 – Reid	Sports and Fitness Center (2,703); Saint Thomas, USVI
11/29/2018*; 8:00 pm, SECN		TCU; Big 12/SEC Women's Challenge	L 50–55	3–5	19 – Sessom	7 – Sessom	2 – Tied	The Pavilion at Ole Miss (1,270); Oxford, MS
12/02/2018*; 2:00 pm		Jacksonville State	L 49–60	3–6	19 – Allen	8 – Dunlap	3 – Allen	The Pavilion at Ole Miss (1,510); Oxford, MS
12/08/2018*; 2:00 pm		Savannah State	W 74–51	4–6	27 – Allen	8 – Tied	8 – Reid	The Pavilion at Ole Miss (1,151); Oxford, MS
12/12/2018*; 11:00 am		Louisiana	W 79–57	5–6	18 – Allen	12 – Dunlap	11 – Reid	The Pavilion at Ole Miss (7,389); Oxford, MS
12/15/2018*; 2:00 pm		at Louisiana Tech	L 71–80	5–7	20 – Sessom	9 – Muhate	6 – Reid	Thomas Assembly Center (1,527); Ruston, LA
12/19/2018*; 6:00 pm		Troy	L 54–71	5–8	20 – Allen	6 – Sessom	4 – Tied	The Pavilion at Ole Miss (1,143); Oxford, MS
12/28/2018*; 1:00 pm		North Florida	W 82–69	6–8	34 – Allen	7 – Allen	10 – Reid	The Pavilion at Ole Miss (1,284); Oxford, MS
SEC regular season
01/03/2019; 7:00 pm		at Missouri	L 55–78	6–9 (0–1)	25 – Allen	6 – Smith	2 – Allen	Mizzou Arena (4,083); Columbia, MO
01/06/2019; 2:00 pm, SECN		Arkansas	L 55–85	6–10 (0–2)	13 – Allen	7 – Crawford	2 – Tied	The Pavilion at Ole Miss (1,642); Oxford, MS
01/10/2019; 7:00 pm		LSU	L 41–55	6–11 (0–3)	12 – Allen	10 – Sessom	5 – Allen	The Pavilion at Ole Miss (1,247); Oxford, MS
01/13/2019; 12:00 pm, SECN		at No. 16 Kentucky	W 55–49	7–11 (1–3)	28 – Allen	10 – Salter	3 – Salter	Memorial Coliseum (4,577); Lexington, KY
01/20/2019; 3:00 pm, SECN		Florida	W 76–66	8–11 (2–3)	19 – Sessom	6 – Sessom	7 – Allen	The Pavilion at Ole Miss (1,507); Oxford, MS
01/24/2019; 7:00 pm		at Vanderbilt	L 68–80	8–12 (2–4)	20 – Allen	8 – Crawford	7 – Reid	Memorial Gymnasium (2,162); Nashville, TN
01/27/2019; 2:00 pm, SECN		at No. 7 Mississippi State	L 49–80	8–13 (2–5)	15 – Allen	5 – Crawford	3 – Allen	Humphrey Coliseum (10,337); Starkville, MS
01/31/2019; 7:00 pm		Auburn	L 51–64	8–14 (2–6)	16 – Tied	8 – Tied	5 – Reid	The Pavilion at Ole Miss (1,296); Oxford, MS
02/03/2019; 2:00 pm		No. 20 Texas A&M	L 60–72	8–15 (2–7)	17 – Sessom	5 – Tied	6 – Reid	The Pavilion at Ole Miss (1,591); Oxford, MS
02/07/2019; 7:00 pm		at No. 12 South Carolina	L 42–76	8–16 (2–8)	13 – Allen	7 – Sessom	3 – Reid	Colonial Life Arena (10,662); Columbia, SC
02/14/2019; 7:00 pm		Vanderbilt	W 65–60	9–16 (3–8)	23 – Allen	6 – Salter	9 – Reid	The Pavilion at Ole Miss (1,311); Oxford, MS
02/18/2019; 6:00 pm, SECN		at Georgia	L 56–78	9–17 (3–9)	21 – Allen	6 – Crawford	2 – Tied	Stegeman Coliseum (3,812); Athens, GA
02/21/2019; 7:00 pm		No. 6 Mississippi State	L 66–80	9–18 (3–10)	29 – Allen	8 – Sessom	4 – Salter	The Pavilion at Ole Miss (4,125); Oxford, MS
02/24/2019; 3:00 pm, SECN		at Arkansas	L 61–73	9–19 (3–11)	12 – Allen	6 – Tied	6 – Reid	Bud Walton Arena (2,455); Fayetteville, AR
02/28/2019; 7:00 pm		at Alabama	L 43–46	9–20 (3–12)	20 – Allen	9 – Salter	2 – Sessom	Coleman Coliseum (1,903); Tuscaloosa, AL
03/03/2019; 2:00 pm		Tennessee	L 56–81	9–21 (3–13)	30 – Allen	9 – Crawford	4 – Reid	The Pavilion at Ole Miss (1,308); Oxford, MS
SEC Women's tournament
03/06/2019; 10:00 am, SECN	(12)	vs. (13) Florida; First Round	L 57–64	9–22	22 – Allen	7 – Salter	1 – Tied	Bon Secours Wellness Arena (4,148); Greenville, SC
*Non-conference game. ^{#}Rankings from AP Poll. (#) Tournament seedings in parentheses. All times are in Central Time.

== See also ==
•2019 Ole Miss Rebels football team
•2018-19 Ole Miss Rebels men's basketball team
•2019 Ole Miss Rebels baseball team
