= 2018–19 Georgia Lady Bulldogs basketball team =

Intercollegiate basketball season

2018–19 Georgia Lady Bulldogs basketball
- Conference: Southeastern Conference
- Record: 18–12 (9–7 SEC)
- Head coach: Joni Taylor (4th season)
- Assistant coaches: Karen Lange; Chelsea Newton; Robert Mosley
- Home arena: Stegeman Coliseum

2018–19 SEC women's basketball standings
| | Conf. | | | | Overall |
| Team | W | | L | PCT | W | | L | PCT |
|---|---|---|---|---|---|---|---|---|
| No. 4 Mississippi State † | 15 | – | 1 | .938 | 33 | – | 3 | .917 |
| No. 15 South Carolina | 13 | – | 3 | .813 | 23 | – | 9 | .719 |
| No. 14 Texas A&M | 12 | – | 4 | .750 | 26 | – | 7 | .788 |
| No. 17 Kentucky | 11 | – | 5 | .688 | 25 | – | 8 | .758 |
| Missouri | 10 | – | 6 | .625 | 24 | – | 11 | .686 |
| Auburn | 9 | – | 7 | .563 | 22 | – | 10 | .688 |
| Georgia | 9 | – | 7 | .563 | 18 | – | 12 | .600 |
| Tennessee | 7 | – | 9 | .438 | 19 | – | 13 | .594 |
| LSU | 7 | – | 9 | .438 | 16 | – | 13 | .552 |
| Arkansas | 6 | – | 10 | .375 | 22 | – | 15 | .595 |
| Alabama | 5 | – | 11 | .313 | 14 | – | 17 | .452 |
| Ole Miss | 3 | – | 13 | .188 | 9 | – | 22 | .290 |
| Florida | 3 | – | 13 | .188 | 8 | – | 23 | .258 |
| Vanderbilt | 2 | – | 14 | .125 | 7 | – | 23 | .233 |
† 2019 SEC tournament winner Rankings from AP poll

The 2018–19 Georgia Lady Bulldogs women's basketball team represented University of Georgia in the 2018–19 NCAA Division I women's basketball season. The Lady Bulldogs, led by fourth-year head coach Joni Taylor, played their home games at Stegeman Coliseum and were members of the Southeastern Conference. They finished the season 18–12, 9–7 in SEC play to finish in a tie for sixth place. They lost in the second round of the SEC women's tournament to Arkansas. Despite having 18 wins, they were not invited to a postseason tournament.

== Previous season ==
The Lady Bulldogs finished the 2017–18 season 26–7, 12–4 in SEC play to finish in a tie for second place. They advanced to the semifinals of the SEC women's tournament, nationally ranked 19th, where they lost to 8th-ranked South Carolina. They received an at-large bid to the NCAA women's tournament where they defeated Mercer in the first round before losing to Duke in the second round.

== Roster ==
2018–19 Georgia Bulldogs women's basketball team
Players
Coaches

| Pos. | # | Name | Height | Year | Previous school | Hometown |
|---|---|---|---|---|---|---|
| G | 0 | Taja Cole | 5 ft 7 in (1.7 m) | RS Jr | Louisville | Richmond, VA |
| G | 1 | Donnetta Johnson | 5 ft 11 in (1.8 m) | Fr | Baldwin HS | Queens, NY |
| G | 2 | Gabby Connally | 5 ft 6 in (1.68 m) | So | Brandeis HS | San Antonio, TX |
| F | 3 | Stephanie Paul | 6 ft 1 in (1.85 m) | Jr | Community School of Naples | Naples, FL |
| F | 4 | Caliya Robinson | 6 ft 3 in (1.91 m) | Sr | McEachern HS | Marietta, GA |
| G | 10 | Caitlin Hose | 5 ft 9 in (1.75 m) | Fr | Hazel Green HS | Hazel Green, AL |
| G | 11 | Maya Caldwell | 5 ft 11 in (1.8 m) | So | Davidson Day School | Charlotte, NC |
| G | 12 | Kaila Hubbard | 5 ft 10 in (1.78 m) | Fr | Holy Innocents' Episcopal | Jonesboro, GA |
| C | 14 | Jenna Staiti | 6 ft 6 in (1.98 m) | RS So | West Forsyth HS | Cumming, GA |
| F | 22 | Malury Bates | 6 ft 3 in (1.91 m) | So | William Fleming HS | Roanoke, VA |
| G | 23 | Que Morrison | 5 ft 6 in (1.68 m) | So | McEachern HS | Riverdale, GA |
| G | 25 | Ari Henderson | 5 ft 7 in (1.7 m) | Jr | Chamblee Charter HS | Chamblee, GA |

Head coach

- Joni Taylor (Alabama)

Assistant coach(es)

- Karen Lange (Iowa)
- Chelsea Newton (Rutgers)
- Robert Mosley (Miles)

Legend

- (C) Team captain
- (S) Suspended
- (I) Ineligible
- (W) Walk-on
- Injured
- Current redshirt

Roster

== Rankings ==
Ranking movements Legend: ██ Increase in ranking ██ Decrease in ranking — = Not ranked RV = Received votes
| | Week | | | | | | | | | | | | | | | | | | | |
| Poll | Pre | 1 | 2 | 3 | 4 | 5 | 6 | 7 | 8 | 9 | 10 | 11 | 12 | 13 | 14 | 15 | 16 | 17 | 18 | Final |
|---|---|---|---|---|---|---|---|---|---|---|---|---|---|---|---|---|---|---|---|---|
| AP | 14 | 14 | RV | RV | RV | — | RV | RV | — | — | RV | — | — | — | — | — | — | — | — | Not released |
| Coaches | 13 | 13^ | 24 | RV | — | — | — | — | — | — | — | — | — | — | — | — | — | — | — | |

^Coaches' Poll did not release a second poll at the same time as the AP.

== Schedule ==
| Date time, TV | Rank^{#} | Opponent^{#} | Result | Record | Site (attendance) city, state |
Non-conference regular season
| 11/09/2018*; 6:00 pm | No. 14 | St. Bonaventure | W 67–40 | 1–0 | Stegeman Coliseum (4,054); Athens, GA |
| 11/11/2018*; 2:00 pm | No. 14 | Winthrop | W 85–39 | 2–0 | Stegeman Coliseum (3,124); Athens, GA |
| 11/14/2018*; 2:00 pm, P12N | No. 14 | at UCLA | L 69–80 | 2–1 | Pauley Pavilion (5,113); Los Angeles, CA |
| 11/18/2018*; 2:00 pm, ACCN Extra | No. 14 | at Georgia Tech; Rivalry | L 53–63 | 2–2 | McCamish Pavilion (2,407); Atlanta, GA |
| 11/22/2018*; 12:00 pm | | vs. Morgan State; Puerto Rico Classic | W 60–33 | 3–2 | Coliseo Rubén Zayas Montañez (75); San Juan, PR |
| 11/24/2018*; 12:00 pm | | vs. No. 7 Maryland; Puerto Rico Classic | L 51–58 | 3–3 | Coliseo Rubén Zayas Montañez; San Juan, PR |
| 11/28/2018*; 7:00 pm | | Mercer | W 67–60 | 4–3 | Stegeman Coliseum (2,117); Athens, GA |
| 12/02/2018*; 2:00 pm | | Charleston Southern | W 83–75 | 5–3 | Stegeman Coliseum (3,069); Athens, GA |
| 12/04/2018*; 7:00 pm | | Furman | W 61–38 | 6–3 | Stegeman Coliseum (2,174); Athens, GA |
| 12/14/2018*; 7:00 pm | | at Villanova | L 56–62 | 6–4 | Finneran Pavilion (659); Villanova, PA |
| 12/19/2018*; 11:00 am | | Lipscomb | W 77–45 | 7–4 | Stegeman Coliseum (7,090); Athens, GA |
| 12/21/2018*; 1:00 pm | | Georgia Southern | W 81–39 | 8–4 | Stegeman Coliseum (2,724); Athens, GA |
| 12/28/2018*; 2:00 pm | | Presbyterian | W 83–59 | 9–4 | Stegeman Coliseum (2,885); Athens, GA |
SEC regular season
| 01/03/2019; 7:00 pm | | LSU | W 63–50 | 10–4 (1–0) | Stegeman Coliseum (2,506); Athens, GA |
| 01/06/2019; 3:00 pm | | at Vanderbilt | W 71–64 | 11–4 (2–0) | Memorial Gymnasium (2,094); Nashville, TN |
| 01/10/2019; 9:00 pm, SECN | | at No. 7 Mississippi State | L 71–80 | 11–5 (2–1) | Humphrey Coliseum (6,493); Starkville, MS |
| 01/13/2019; 3:00 pm, ESPN | | No. 13 Tennessee | W 66–62 | 12–5 (3–1) | Stegeman Coliseum (5,867); Athens, GA |
| 01/17/2019; 7:00 pm, SECN | | at Missouri | L 35–61 | 12–6 (3–2) | Mizzou Arena (4,004); Columbia, MO |
| 01/20/2019; 4:00 pm, ESPN2 | | Texas A&M | L 66–76 | 12–7 (3–3) | Stegeman Coliseum (4,773); Athens, GA |
| 01/27/2019; 2:00 pm, ESPNU | | Alabama | L 53–58 | 12–8 (3–4) | Stegeman Coliseum (4,794); Athens, GA |
| 01/31/2019; 8:00 pm | | at Arkansas | W 80–72 | 13–8 (4–4) | Bud Walton Arena (1,116); Fayetteville, AR |
| 02/03/2019; 3:00 pm, SECN | | at Auburn | L 58–59 ^{OT} | 13–9 (4–5) | Auburn Arena (2,170); Auburn, AL |
| 02/10/2019; 12:00 pm, ESPNU | | Florida | W 93–58 | 14–9 (5–5) | Stegeman Coliseum (5,515); Athens, GA |
| 02/14/2019; 7:00 pm, SECN | | at No. 11 South Carolina | L 57–65 | 14–10 (5–6) | Colonial Life Arena (11,044); Columbia, SC |
| 02/18/2019; 7:00 pm, SECN | | Ole Miss | W 78–56 | 15–10 (6–6) | Stegeman Coliseum (3,812); Athens, GA |
| 02/21/2019; 7:00 pm | | Arkansas | W 93–83 | 16–10 (7–6) | Stegeman Coliseum (3,317); Athens, GA |
| 02/24/2019; 6:00 pm, SECN | | at Alabama | W 76–67 ^{OT} | 17–10 (8–6) | Coleman Coliseum (1,091); Tuscaloosa, AL |
| 02/28/2019; 7:00 pm | | at Florida | W 69–57 | 18–10 (9–6) | O'Connell Center (1,062); Gainesville, FL |
| 03/03/2019; 1:00 pm, SECN | | No. 11 Kentucky | L 53–58 | 18–11 (9–7) | Stegeman Coliseum (3,461); Athens, GA |
SEC Women's Tournament
| 03/07/2019; 6:00 pm, SECN | (7) | vs. (10) Arkansas; Second Round | L 76–86 | 18–12 | Bon Secours Wellness Arena; Greenville, SC |
*Non-conference game. ^{#}Rankings from AP Poll. (#) Tournament seedings in parentheses. All times are in Eastern Time.
