= 2018–19 Arkansas Razorbacks women's basketball team =

Intercollegiate basketball season

2018–19 Arkansas Razorbacks women's basketball

WNIT, Third Round
- Conference: Southeastern Conference
- Record: 22–15 (6–10 SEC)
- Head coach: Mike Neighbors (2nd season)
- Assistant coaches: Lacey Goldwire; Todd Schaefer; Pauline Love
- Home arena: Bud Walton Arena (Capacity: 19,368)

2018–19 SEC women's basketball standings
	Conf.				Overall
Team	W		L	PCT	W		L	PCT
No. 4 Mississippi State †	15	–	1	.938	33	–	3	.917
No. 15 South Carolina	13	–	3	.813	23	–	9	.719
No. 14 Texas A&M	12	–	4	.750	26	–	7	.788
No. 17 Kentucky	11	–	5	.688	25	–	8	.758
Missouri	10	–	6	.625	24	–	11	.686
Auburn	9	–	7	.563	22	–	10	.688
Georgia	9	–	7	.563	18	–	12	.600
Tennessee	7	–	9	.438	19	–	13	.594
LSU	7	–	9	.438	16	–	13	.552
Arkansas	6	–	10	.375	22	–	15	.595
Alabama	5	–	11	.313	14	–	17	.452
Ole Miss	3	–	13	.188	9	–	22	.290
Florida	3	–	13	.188	8	–	23	.258
Vanderbilt	2	–	14	.125	7	–	23	.233
† 2019 SEC tournament winner Rankings from AP poll

The 2018–19 Arkansas Razorbacks women's basketball team represented the University of Arkansas in the 2018–19 NCAA Division I women's basketball season. They were led by second-year head coach Mike Neighbors and played their home games at Bud Walton Arena in Fayetteville, Arkansas.

The Razorbacks finished the regular season 17–13, 6–10 in conference play. They were seeded 10th in the SEC tournament, earning a first-round bye. The team advanced to the finals, the lowest seed to do so in tournament history, against Mississippi State, where they lost 101–70. The team completed its postseason by advancing to the third round in the Women's National Invitation Tournament, where they lost to TCU.

== Previous season ==
The Razorbacks finished the 2017–18 season 13–18, 3–13 in SEC play to finish in a tie for eleventh place. They advanced to the second round of the SEC tournament, where they lost to Texas A&M.

== Roster ==
2018–19 Arkansas Razorbacks women's basketball team
Players
Coaches

Pos.	#	Name	Height	Year	Previous school	Hometown
G	0	A'Tyanna Gaulden	5 ft 7 in (1.7 m)	RS So	Americus Sumter HS; Florida State	Ocilla, GA
G	1	Raven Northcross-Baker	5 ft 7 in (1.7 m)	Sr	Malvern HS; Chipola College	Malvern, AR
G	2	Alexis Tolefree	5 ft 8 in (1.73 m)	Jr	Conway HS; Jones County JC	Conway, AR
G	3	Malica Monk	5 ft 5 in (1.65 m)	Sr	North Little Rock HS	North Little Rock, AR
G/F	4	Keiryn Swenson	6 ft 1 in (1.85 m)	Sr	Maize HS	Wichita, KS
F/C	10	Kiara Williams	6 ft 1 in (1.85 m)	Jr	Little Rock Central HS	Little Rock, AR
G	13	Grayce Spangler	5 ft 11 in (1.8 m)	So	Fayetteville HS	Fayetteville, AR
G	14	Jailyn Mason	5 ft 9 in (1.75 m)	Jr	William Mason HS	Mason, OH
F	20	Sydney Stout	6 ft 0 in (1.83 m)	Jr	Bixby HS	Bixby, OK
G/F	22	Bailey Zimmerman	6 ft 0 in (1.83 m)	Sr	Wonderview HS	Hattieville, AR
G	23	Amber Ramirez (redshirt)	5 ft 8 in (1.73 m)	Jr	Wagner; TCU	San Antonio, TX
F	24	Taylah Thomas	6 ft 1 in (1.85 m)	So	Mansfield Timberview HS	Arlington, TX
F	30	Macy Weaver	6 ft 3 in (1.91 m)	So	Stillman Valley HS	Davis Junction, IL
G	33	Chelsea Dungee	5 ft 11 in (1.8 m)	RS So	Sapulpa HS; Oklahoma	Sapulpa, OK
G	52	Rokia Doumbia	5 ft 9 in (1.75 m)	Fr	IMG Academy	Bradenton, FL

Head coach

- Mike Neighbors (Arkansas)

Assistant coach(es)

- Lacey Goldwire (Oklahoma State)
- Todd Schaefer (Thomas More)
- Pauline Love (Southern Miss)

Legend

- (C) Team captain
- (S) Suspended
- (I) Ineligible
- (W) Walk-on
- Injured
- Current redshirt

Roster

== Schedule ==
Date time, TV	Rank^{#}	Opponent^{#}	Result	Record	Site (attendance) city, state
Exhibition
October 29, 2018*; 7:00 pm		Southwest Baptist	W 115–53		Bud Walton Arena (1,058); Fayetteville, AR
November 1*; 7:00 pm		East Central	W 101–46		Bud Walton Arena (900); Fayetteville, AR
Non-conference regular season
November 9*; 10:30 am		Northwestern State	W 98–53	1–0	Bud Walton Arena (5,497); Fayetteville, AR
November 14*; 7:00 pm, ESPN+		at UT Arlington	W 66–65	2–0	College Park Center (1,081); Arlington, TX
November 18*; 7:00 pm, SECN		No. 22 Arizona State	L 85–88	2–1	Bud Walton Arena (1,519); Fayetteville, AR
November 23*; 7:30 pm		vs. Tennessee State; Challenge in Music City	W 79–55	3–1	Nashville Municipal Auditorium; Nashville, TN
November 24*; 7:30 pm		vs. Pittsburgh; Challenge in Music City	L 54–61	3–2	Nashville Municipal Auditorium; Nashville, TN
November 25*; 7:30 pm		vs. Wisconsin; Challenge in Music City	W 69–68	4–2	Nashville Municipal Auditorium; Nashville, TN
November 28*; 7:00 pm		Oral Roberts	W 74–61	5–2	Bud Walton Arena (1,119); Fayetteville, AR
December 2*; 2:00 pm		at Iowa State; Big 12/SEC Women's Challenge	L 82–91	5–3	Hilton Coliseum (10,097); Ames, IA
December 4*; 7:00 pm		Tennessee Tech	W 65–42	6–3	Bud Walton Arena (915); Fayetteville, AR
December 8*; 1:00 pm		at Abilene Christian	W 80–68	7–3	Moody Coliseum (1,288); Abilene, TX
December 16*; 2:00 pm		Prairie View A&M	W 71–44	8–3	Bud Walton Arena (1,892); Fayetteville, AR
December 18*; 7:00 pm		Nebraska	W 84–80	9–3	Bud Walton Arena (1,335); Fayetteville, AR
December 20*; 2:00 pm, CST		at Tulsa	W 61–59	10–3	Reynolds Center (1,222); Tulsa, OK
December 30*; 2:00 pm		Jackson State	W 76–57	11–3	Bud Walton Arena (2,270); Fayetteville, AR
SEC regular season
January 3, 2019; 6:00 pm, SECN		No. 7 Mississippi State	L 69–93	11–4 (0–1)	Bud Walton Arena (2,263); Fayetteville, AR
January 6; 2:00 pm, SECN		at Ole Miss	W 85–55	12–4 (1–1)	The Pavilion at Ole Miss (1,642); Oxford, MS
January 10; 7:00 pm		at Missouri	L 53–71	12–5 (1–2)	Mizzou Arena (4,216); Columbia, MO
January 13; 2:00 pm		Vanderbilt	W 83–62	13–5 (2–2)	Bud Walton Arena (1,553); Fayetteville, AR
January 21; 6:00 pm, SECN		at Tennessee	W 80–79	14–5 (3–2)	Thompson–Boling Arena (7,259); Knoxville, TN
January 24; 7:00 pm		Alabama	W 72–61	15–5 (4–2)	Bud Walton Arena (1,375); Fayetteville, AR
January 27; 1:00 pm		at Florida	W 83–73	16–5 (5–2)	O'Connell Center (2,009); Gainesville, FL
January 31; 7:00 pm		Georgia	L 72–80	16–6 (5–3)	Bud Walton Arena (1,116); Fayetteville, AR
February 3; 4:00 pm, SECN		No. 16 South Carolina	L 79–87	16–7 (5–4)	Bud Walton Arena (1,637); Fayetteville, AR
February 7; 8:00 pm, SECN		at LSU	L 34–71	16–8 (5–5)	Maravich Assembly Center (1,599); Baton Rouge, LA
February 10; 1:00 pm, SECN		Auburn	L 72–75	16–9 (5–6)	Bud Walton Arena (2,455); Fayetteville, AR
February 17; 1:00 pm		at No. 17 Kentucky	L 59–61	16–10 (5–7)	Memorial Coliseum (5,680); Lexington, KY
February 21; 6:00 pm		at Georgia	L 83–93	16–11 (5–8)	Stegeman Coliseum (3,317); Athens, GA
February 24; 3:00 pm, SECN		Ole Miss	W 73–61	17–11 (6–8)	Bud Walton Arena (2,455); Fayetteville, AR
February 28; 8:00 pm, SECN		Missouri	L 67–73	17–12 (6–9)	Bud Walton Arena (1,153); Fayetteville, AR
March 3; 4:00 pm, SECN		at No. 19 Texas A&M	L 53–66	17–13 (6–10)	Reed Arena (3,609); College Station, TX
SEC Tournament
March 7; 5:00 pm, SECN	(10)	vs. (7) Georgia; Second Round	W 86–76	18–13	Bon Secours Wellness Arena (3,089); Greenville, SC
March 8; 5:00 pm, SECN	(10)	vs. (2) No. 12 South Carolina; Quarterfinals	W 95–89	19–13	Bon Secours Wellness Arena (5,709); Greenville, SC
March 9; 6:30 pm, ESPNU	(10)	vs. (3) No. 15 Texas A&M; Semifinals	W 58–51	20–13	Bon Secours Wellness Arena (5,817); Greenville, SC
March 10; 1:00 pm, ESPN2	(10)	vs. (1) No. 5 Mississippi State; Championship Game	L 70–101	20–14	Bon Secours Wellness Arena (5,771); Greenville, SC
Women's National Invitation Tournament
March 21*; 7:00 pm		Houston; First Round	W 88–80 ^{OT}	21–14	Bud Walton Arena (3,689); Fayetteville, AR
March 24*; 2:00 pm		UAB; Second Round	W 100–52	22–14	Bud Walton Arena (3,939); Fayetteville, AR
March 28*; 7:00 pm		TCU; Third Round	L 78–82	22–15	Bud Walton Arena (5,287); Fayetteville, AR
*Non-conference game. ^{#}Rankings from AP Poll. (#) Tournament seedings in parentheses. All times are in Central time.

== Rankings ==
2018–19 NCAA Division I women's basketball rankings

Regular season polls
Poll	Pre- Season	Week 2	Week 3	Week 4	Week 5	Week 6	Week 7	Week 8	Week 9	Week 10	Week 11	Week 12	Week 13	Week 14	Week 15	Week 16	Week 17	Week 18	Week 19	Final
AP																				N/A
Coaches													RV							

Legend
	Increase in ranking
	Decrease in ranking
	No change
(RV)	Received votes
(NR)	Not ranked

== See also ==
- 2018–19 Arkansas Razorbacks men's basketball team
