= 2018–19 Alabama Crimson Tide women's basketball team =

Intercollegiate basketball season

2018–19 Alabama Crimson Tide women's basketball
- Conference: Southeastern Conference
- Record: 14–17 (5–11 SEC)
- Head coach: Kristy Curry (6th season)
- Assistant coaches: Tiffany Coppage; Kelly Curry; Brooks Donald-Williams
- Home arena: Coleman Coliseum

2018–19 SEC women's basketball standings
	Conf.				Overall
Team	W		L	PCT	W		L	PCT
No. 4 Mississippi State †	15	–	1	.938	33	–	3	.917
No. 15 South Carolina	13	–	3	.813	23	–	9	.719
No. 14 Texas A&M	12	–	4	.750	26	–	7	.788
No. 17 Kentucky	11	–	5	.688	25	–	8	.758
Missouri	10	–	6	.625	24	–	11	.686
Auburn	9	–	7	.563	22	–	10	.688
Georgia	9	–	7	.563	18	–	12	.600
Tennessee	7	–	9	.438	19	–	13	.594
LSU	7	–	9	.438	16	–	13	.552
Arkansas	6	–	10	.375	22	–	15	.595
Alabama	5	–	11	.313	14	–	17	.452
Ole Miss	3	–	13	.188	9	–	22	.290
Florida	3	–	13	.188	8	–	23	.258
Vanderbilt	2	–	14	.125	7	–	23	.233
† 2019 SEC tournament winner Rankings from AP poll

The 2018–19 Alabama Crimson Tide women's basketball team represented the University of Alabama in the 2018–19 NCAA Division I women's basketball season. The Crimson Tide, led by sixth-year head coach Kristy Curry, played their games at Coleman Coliseum and were members of the Southeastern Conference. They finished the season 14–17, 5–11 in SEC play to finish in eleventh place. They defeated Vanderbilt in the first round of the SEC women's tournament before losing to Auburn in the second round.

== Previous season ==
The Crimson Tide finished the 2017–18 season 20–14, 7–9 in SEC play to finish in eighth place. They lost in the second round of the SEC women's tournament to Kentucky. They received an automatic bid to the Women's National Invitation Tournament and defeated Southern, UCF and Georgia Tech in the first, second and third rounds, before losing to Virginia Tech in the quarterfinals.

== Roster ==
2018–19 Alabama Crimson Tide women's basketball team
Players
Coaches

Pos.	#	Name	Height	Year	Previous school	Hometown
G	0	Taniyah Worth	6 ft 1 in (1.85 m)	Fr	Flowery Branch HS	Flowery Branch, GA
G	1	Megan Abrams	5 ft 9 in (1.75 m)	Fr	Lafayette Christian Academy	Lafayette, LA
G	2	Amber Richardson	6 ft 0 in (1.83 m)	Sr	Southeast Raleigh Magnet HS	Garner, NC
G	3	Jordan Lewis	5 ft 7 in (1.7 m)	Jr	Lake Highland Prep	Windermere, FL
G	4	Cierra Johnson	5 ft 10 in (1.78 m)	Jr	Shelton State CC	Mobile, AL
G	5	Hannah Barber	5 ft 6 in (1.68 m)	Fr	Homewood HS	Homewood, AL
G	10	Taylor Berry	5 ft 9 in (1.75 m)	Sr	Mount Carmel Academy	New Orleans, LA
F	12	Allie Craig Cruce	6 ft 1 in (1.85 m)	Fr	Lauderdale County HS	Killen, AL
F	22	Ariyah Copeland	6 ft 3 in (1.91 m)	So	Columbus HS	Columbus, GA
G	23	Shaquera Wade	6 ft 0 in (1.83 m)	Sr	Huntsville HS	Huntsville, AL
G	24	De'sha Benjamin	6 ft 0 in (1.83 m)	Fr	Lucy Craft Laney HS	Augusta, GA
F	25	Ashley Knight	6 ft 5 in (1.96 m)	Jr	Lyndon B. Johnson HS	Austin, TX
G	34	Grace Pelphrey	6 ft 1 in (1.85 m)	Fr	Tuscaloosa Academy	Tuscaloosa, AL
F	40	Jasmine Walker	6 ft 3 in (1.91 m)	So	Jefferson Davis HS	Montgomery, AL
C	42	Shelby Gibson	6 ft 3 in (1.91 m)	Jr	Ole Miss	Murfreesboro, TN

Head coach

- Kristy Curry (Louisiana–Monroe)

Assistant coach(es)

- Tiffany Coppage (Missouri State)
- Kelly Curry (Texas A&M)
- Brooks Donald-Williams (Mississippi State)

Legend

- (C) Team captain
- (S) Suspended
- (I) Ineligible
- (W) Walk-on
- Injured
- Current redshirt

Roster
Last update: September 17, 2018

== Schedule ==
Date time, TV	Rank^{#}	Opponent^{#}	Result	Record	Site (attendance) city, state
Exhibition
10/21/2018*; 3:00 pm		Faulkner	W 100–44		Coleman Coliseum; Tuscaloosa, AL
11/01/2018*; 7:00 pm		Mississippi College	W 82–53		Coleman Coliseum; Tuscaloosa, AL
Non-conference regular season
11/07/2018*; 7:00 pm		Southeastern Louisiana	W 88–40	1–0	Coleman Coliseum (1,948); Tuscaloosa, AL
11/13/2018*; 8:00 pm		at Utah	L 62–72	1–1	Jon M. Huntsman Center (2,082); Salt Lake City, UT
11/15/2018*; 7:00 pm		at SMU	W 62–61 ^{OT}	2–1	Moody Coliseum (596); Dallas, TX
11/19/2018*; 7:00 pm, SECN		Clemson	W 76–56	3–1	Coleman Coliseum (2,147); Tuscaloosa, AL
11/23/2018*; 2:00 pm		Grambling State	W 73–55	4–1	Coleman Coliseum (2,083); Tuscaloosa, AL
11/27/2018*; 7:00 pm		Stetson	W 59–47	5–1	Coleman Coliseum (1,919); Tuscaloosa, AL
12/01/2018*; 4:30 pm		vs. Tulsa; ASU Classic semifinals	L 73–80	5–2	Wells Fargo Arena (2,626); Tempe, AZ
12/02/2018*; 12:30 pm		vs. Louisiana Tech; ASU Classic 3rd place game	L 62–79	5–3	Wells Fargo Arena; Tempe, AZ
12/05/2018*; 11:30 am		South Alabama	L 67–72	5–4	Coleman Coliseum (4,149); Tuscaloosa, AL
12/08/2018*; 2:00 pm		Tulane	W 69–58	6–4	Coleman Coliseum (1,943); Tuscaloosa, AL
12/16/2018*; 2:00 pm		Northwestern State	W 87–73	7–4	Coleman Coliseum (2,113); Tuscaloosa, AL
12/20/2018*; 3:00 pm		vs. Virginia; Florida Sunshine Classic	W 64–52	8–4	Warden Arena (298); Orlando, FL
12/21/2018*; 5:15 pm		vs. No. 24 Miami (FL); Florida Sunshine Classic	L 74–101	8–5	Warden Arena (472); Orlando, FL
SEC regular season
01/03/2019; 7:00 pm		Florida	W 74–67	9–5 (1–0)	Coleman Coliseum (2,514); Tuscaloosa, AL
01/06/2019; 11:00 am, ESPNU		at No. 23 South Carolina	L 59–62	9–6 (1–1)	Colonial Life Arena (11,392); Columbia, SC
01/10/2019; 7:00 pm		Auburn	L 56–66	9–7 (1–2)	Coleman Coliseum (2,575); Tuscaloosa, AL
01/13/2019; 1:00 pm, ESPNU		at Texas A&M	L 43–70	9–8 (1–3)	Reed Arena (4,042); College Station, TX
01/17/2019; 8:00 pm, SECN		No. 20 Tennessee	W 86–65	10–8 (2–3)	Coleman Coliseum (2,392); Tuscaloosa, AL
01/20/2019; 1:00 pm, SECN		LSU	L 56–62	10–9 (2–4)	Coleman Coliseum (2,630); Tuscaloosa, AL
01/24/2019; 7:00 pm		at Arkansas	L 61–72	10–10 (2–5)	Bud Walton Arena (1,375); Fayetteville, AR
01/27/2019; 1:00 pm, ESPNU		at Georgia	W 58–53	11–10 (3–5)	Stegeman Coliseum (4,794); Athens, GA
02/03/2019; 12:00 pm, SECN		No. 6 Mississippi State	L 49–65	11–11 (3–6)	Coleman Coliseum (3,769); Tuscaloosa, AL
02/07/2019; 6:00 pm		at Florida	L 55–57	11–12 (3–7)	O'Connell Center (1,206); Gainesville, FL
02/11/2019; 6:00 pm, SECN		No. 17 Kentucky	L 53–68	11–13 (3–8)	Coleman Coliseum (2,102); Tuscaloosa, AL
02/17/2019; 3:00 pm, SECN		at Auburn	L 38–77	11–14 (3–9)	Auburn Arena (2,631); Auburn, AL
02/21/2019; 7:00 pm		at Vanderbilt	W 84–65	12–14 (4–9)	Memorial Gymnasium (3,567); Nashville, TN
02/24/2019; 5:00 pm, SECN		Georgia	L 67–76 ^{OT}	12–15 (4–10)	Coleman Coliseum (1,091); Tuscaloosa, AL
02/28/2019; 7:00 pm		Ole Miss	W 46–43	13–15 (5–10)	Coleman Coliseum (1,903); Tuscaloosa, AL
03/03/2019; 2:00 pm		at Missouri	L 47–82	13–16 (5–11)	Mizzou Arena (6,527); Columbia, MO
SEC Women's Tournament
03/06/2019; 12:30 pm, SECN	(11)	vs. (14) Vanderbilt; First Round	W 74–57	14–16	Bon Secours Wellness Arena (4,148); Greenville, SC
03/07/2019; 7:30 pm, SECN	(11)	vs. (6) Auburn; Second Round	L 52–53	14–17	Bon Secours Wellness Arena (3,089); Greenville, SC
*Non-conference game. ^{#}Rankings from AP Poll. (#) Tournament seedings in parentheses. All times are in CST.

== Rankings ==
2018–19 NCAA Division I women's basketball rankings

Regular season polls
Poll	Pre- Season	Week 2	Week 3	Week 4	Week 5	Week 6	Week 7	Week 8	Week 9	Week 10	Week 11	Week 12	Week 13	Week 14	Week 15	Week 16	Week 17	Week 18	Week 19	Final
AP																				N/A
Coaches												RV								

Legend
	Increase in ranking
	Decrease in ranking
	No change
(RV)	Received votes
(NR)	Not ranked
