= 2018–19 South Carolina Gamecocks women's basketball team =

Intercollegiate basketball season

2018–19 South Carolina Gamecocks women's basketball

NCAA tournament, Sweet Sixteen
- Conference: Southeastern Conference

Ranking
- Coaches: No. 13
- AP: No. 15
- Record: 23–10 (13–3 SEC)
- Head coach: Dawn Staley (11th season)
- Assistant coaches: Lisa Boyer; Fred Chmiel; Jolette Law
- Home arena: Colonial Life Arena

2018–19 SEC women's basketball standings
	Conf.				Overall
Team	W		L	PCT	W		L	PCT
No. 4 Mississippi State †	15	–	1	.938	33	–	3	.917
No. 15 South Carolina	13	–	3	.813	23	–	9	.719
No. 14 Texas A&M	12	–	4	.750	26	–	7	.788
No. 17 Kentucky	11	–	5	.688	25	–	8	.758
Missouri	10	–	6	.625	24	–	11	.686
Auburn	9	–	7	.563	22	–	10	.688
Georgia	9	–	7	.563	18	–	12	.600
Tennessee	7	–	9	.438	19	–	13	.594
LSU	7	–	9	.438	16	–	13	.552
Arkansas	6	–	10	.375	22	–	15	.595
Alabama	5	–	11	.313	14	–	17	.452
Ole Miss	3	–	13	.188	9	–	22	.290
Florida	3	–	13	.188	8	–	23	.258
Vanderbilt	2	–	14	.125	7	–	23	.233
† 2019 SEC tournament winner Rankings from AP poll

The 2018–19 South Carolina Gamecocks women's basketball team represented the University of South Carolina during the 2018–19 NCAA Division I women's basketball season. The Gamecocks, led by eleventh year head coach Dawn Staley, played their home games at the Colonial Life Arena and were members of the Southeastern Conference. They finished the season 23–10, 13–3 in SEC play to finish in second place. They lost in the quarterfinals of the SEC women's tournament to Arkansas. They received an at-large bid to the NCAA women's tournament where they defeated Belmont and Florida State in the first and second rounds before losing to Baylor in the Sweet Sixteen.

== Previous season ==
The Gamecocks finished the 2017–18 season 29–7, 12–4 in SEC play to finish in a tie for second place. They defeated Tennessee, Georgia and Mississippi State to win the SEC women's tournament to earn an automatic bid to the NCAA women's tournament. They defeated North Carolina A&T and Virginia in the first and second rounds, Buffalo in the sweet sixteen before losing to Connecticut in the elite eight.

== Offseason ==
=== Departures ===
Name	Number	Pos.	Height	Year	Hometown	Notes
A'ja Wilson	22	F	6'5"	Senior	Hopkins, SC	Graduated/Declared to 2018 WNBA draft #1 Overall pick
Lindsey Spann	11	G	5'6"	RS Senior	Laurel, MD	Graduated

=== Recruits ===
College recruiting information
Name	Hometown	School	Height	Weight	Commit date
Destanni Henderson #1 PG	Lehigh Acres, FL	Fort Myers	5 ft 8 in (1.73 m)	N/A	
Destanni Henderson #1 PG	Recruit ratings: ESPN: (98)				
Victaria Saxton #6 F	Rome, GA	Model	6 ft 1 in (1.85 m)	N/A	
Victaria Saxton #6 F	Recruit ratings: ESPN: (96)				
Elysa Wesolek; F	Charleston, SC	Northwood Academy	6 ft 1 in (1.85 m)	N/A	
Elysa Wesolek; F	Recruit ratings: ESPN: (89)				
Overall recruit ranking:
Note: In many cases, Scout, Rivals, 247Sports, On3, and ESPN may conflict in their listings of height and weight.; In these cases, the average was taken. ESPN grades are on a 100-point scale.; Sources: "2018 Player Commits". ESPN. Archived from the original on March 16, 2018.

== Roster ==
2018–19 South Carolina Gamecocks women's basketball team
Players
Coaches

Pos.	#	Name	Height	Year	Previous school	Hometown
G	0	Nelly Perry	5 ft 10 in (1.78 m)	RS So	Brimm Medical Arts	Camden, NJ
G	1	Bianca Cuevas-Moore	5 ft 6 in (1.68 m)	RS Sr	Nazareth Regional	Bronx, NY
G	2	Te'a Cooper	5 ft 8 in (1.73 m)	Jr	McEachern HS; Tennessee	Powder Springs, GA
G	3	Destanni Henderson	5 ft 8 in (1.73 m)	Fr	Fort Myers	Fort Myers, FL
G	4	Doniyah Cliney	6 ft 0 in (1.83 m)	Sr	Malcolm X Shabazz	Newark, NJ
F	5	Victaria Saxton	6 ft 1 in (1.85 m)	Fr	Model	Rome, GA
G	10	Bianca Jackson	5 ft 10 in (1.78 m)	So	Brewbaker Tech Magnet	Montgomery, AL
F	21	Mikiah Herbert Harrigan	6 ft 2 in (1.88 m)	Jr	Flanagan	Pembroke Pines, FL
C	23	LaDazhia Williams	6 ft 2 in (1.88 m)	So	Lakewood Ranch	Bradenton, FL
G	24	Lele Grissett	6 ft 0 in (1.83 m)	So	Hillside	Durham, NC
F	32	Elysa Wesolek	6 ft 1 in (1.85 m)	Fr	Northwood Academy	Charleston, SC
F	35	Alexis Jennings	6 ft 2 in (1.88 m)	RS Sr	Sparkman HS; Kentucky	Madison, AL
G	52	Tyasha Harris	5 ft 10 in (1.78 m)	Jr	Heritage Christian	Noblesville, IN

Head coach

- Dawn Staley (Virginia)

Assistant coach(es)

- Lisa Boyer (Ithaca)
- Fred Chmiel (Alaska–Anchorage)
- Jolette Law (Iowa)

Legend

- (C) Team captain
- (S) Suspended
- (I) Ineligible
- (W) Walk-on
- Injured
- Current redshirt

Roster

== Schedule ==
Date time, TV	Rank^{#}	Opponent^{#}	Result	Record	High points	High rebounds	High assists	Site (attendance) city, state
Exhibition
11/02/2018*; 7:00 pm	No. 10	Lander	W 100–62	–	20 – Cooper	10 – Saxton	6 – Henderson	Colonial Life Arena (302); Columbia, SC
Regular season
11/11/2018*; 4:00 pm	No. 10	at Alabama State	W 94–38	1-0	17 – Cooper	6 – Herbert Harrigan	5 – Harris	Dunn–Oliver Acadome (3,128); Montgomery, AL
11/15/2018*; 6:30 pm, SECN	No. 10	Clemson; Rivalry	W 69–57	2–0	15 – Cooper	7 – Saxton	6 – Harris	Colonial Life Arena (11,539); Columbia, SC
11/18/2018*; 5:30 pm, ESPN	No. 10	No. 9 Maryland	L 61–85	2–1	14 – Herbert Harrigan	6 – Grissett	3 – Cooper	Colonial Life Arena (11,240); Columbia, SC
11/22/2018*; 9:00 pm	No. 13	vs. East Tennessee State; Vancouver Showcase Quarterfinals	W 101–55	3–1	14 – Tied	7 – Tied	5 – Harris	Vancouver Convention Centre (284); Vancouver, BC
11/23/2018*; 11:30 pm	No. 13	vs. No. 9 Oregon State; Vancouver Showcase Semifinals	L 68–70	3–2	22 – Cooper	14 – Jennings	4 – Cooper	Vancouver Convention Centre (1,156); Vancouver, BC
11/24/2018*; 10:30 pm	No. 13	vs. Drake; Vancouver Showcase 3rd place game	L 85–90 ^{OT}	3–3	31 – Cooper	7 – Cliney	4 – Jackson	Vancouver Convention Centre; Vancouver, BC
11/28/2018*; 7:00 pm	No. 18	Dayton	W 65–55	4–3	24 – Harris	9 – Grissett	1 – Tied	Colonial Life Arena (10,423); Columbia, SC
12/02/2018*; 7:00 pm, ESPN2	No. 18	No. 4 Baylor; Big 12/SEC Women's Challenge	L 69–94	4–4	16 – Cooper	10 – Grissett	4 – Harris	Colonial Life Arena (10,531); Columbia, SC
12/05/2018*; 7:00 pm	No. 22	Appalachian State	W 80–50	5–4	12 – Cuevas-Moore	8 – Williams	7 – Harris	Colonial Life Arena (10,380); Columbia, SC
12/09/2018*; 2:00 pm	No. 22	at Duke; Postponed; inclement weather						Cameron Indoor Stadium; Durham, NC
12/16/2018*; 3:00 pm, ESPN2	No. 25	at Purdue	W 82–73 ^{2OT}	6–4	19 – Tied	15 – Herbert Harrigan	7 – Harris	Mackey Arena (10,086); West Lafayette, IN
12/21/2018*; 7:00 pm, SECN	No. 25	Temple	W 88–60	7–4	16 – Cooper	8 – Grissett	6 – Harris	Colonial Life Arena (11,297); Columbia, SC
12/30/2018*; 2:00 pm	No. 25	Furman	W 66–53	8–4	19 – Jennings	5 – Grissett	4 – Harris	Colonial Life Arena (11,206); Columbia, SC
01/03/2019; 9:00 pm, SECN	No. 23	at No. 21 Texas A&M	W 60–57	9–4 (1–0)	24 – Cooper	16 – Herbert Harrigan	6 – Cooper	Reed Arena (4,010); College Station, TX
01/06/2019; 12:00 pm, ESPNU	No. 23	Alabama	W 62–59	10–4 (2–0)	18 – Herbert Harrigan	9 – Herbert Harrigan	4 – Cooper	Colonial Life Arena (11,392); Columbia, SC
01/10/2019; 7:00 pm	No. 21	Florida	W 71–40	11–4 (3–0)	16 – Cuevas-Moore	9 – Grissett	8 – Harris	Colonial Life Arena (10,353); Columbia, SC
01/13/2019; 5:00 pm, SECN	No. 21	at LSU	W 76–53	12–4 (4–0)	14 – Cooper	9 – Grissett	5 – Harris	Pete Maravich Assembly Center (2,997); Baton Rouge, LA
01/17/2019; 7:00 pm, ESPN	No. 15	at No. 7 Mississippi State	L 74–89	12–5 (4–1)	27 – Cooper	5 – Cooper	6 – Cooper	Humphrey Coliseum (10,006); Starkville, MS
01/21/2019; 7:00 pm, ESPN2	No. 19	No. 25 Missouri	W 79–65	13–5 (5–1)	16 – Tied	17 – Herbert Harrigan	5 – Harris	Colonial Life Arena (12,004); Columbia, SC
01/28/2019; 7:00 pm, SECN	No. 16	Vanderbilt	W 80–69	14–5 (6–1)	18 – Cooper	8 – Saxton	6 – Harris	Colonial Life Arena (11,166); Columbia, SC
01/31/2019; 6:30 pm, SECN	No. 16	at No. 19 Kentucky	W 74–70	15–5 (7–1)	18 – Jennings	12 – Jennings	5 – Harris	Memorial Coliseum (4,247); Lexington, KY
02/03/2019; 5:00 pm, SECN	No. 16	at Arkansas	W 87–79	16–5 (8–1)	19 – Tied	12 – Jennings	5 – Harris	Bud Walton Arena (1,637); Fayetteville, AR
02/07/2019; 7:00 pm	No. 12	Ole Miss	W 76–42	17–5 (9–1)	13 – Perry	6 – Grissett	9 – Harris	Colonial Life Arena (10,662); Columbia, SC
02/11/2019; 7:00 pm, ESPN2	No. 11	at No. 4 Connecticut	L 79–97	17–6	25 – Cuevas-Moore	4 – Jennings	5 – Harris	XL Center (11,740); Hartford, CT
02/14/2019; 7:00 pm, SECN	No. 11	Georgia	W 65–57	18–6 (10–1)	14 – Henderson	7 – Herbert Harrigan	4 – Henderson	Colonial Life Arena (11,044); Columbia, SC
02/17/2019; 2:00 pm	No. 11	at Florida	W 96–77	19–6 (11–1)	22 – Jennings	5 – Tied	10 – Harris	O'Connell Center (3,213); Gainesville, FL
02/21/2019; 7:00 pm, SECN	No. 13	No. 16 Kentucky	L 57–65	19–7 (11–2)	12 – Tied	2 – Jennings	7 – Harris	Colonial Life Arena (11,887); Columbia, SC
02/24/2019; 4:00 pm, ESPN2	No. 13	at Tennessee	W 82–67	20–7 (12–2)	28 – Cuevas-Moore	7 – Tied	14 – Harris	Thompson–Boling Arena (9,448); Knoxville, TN
02/28/2019; 7:00 pm	No. 14	at Auburn	W 73–66	21–7 (13–2)	18 – Herbert Harrigan	10 – Jennings	10 – Harris	Auburn Arena (1,912); Auburn, AL
03/03/2019; 2:00 pm, ESPN2	No. 14	No. 5 Mississippi State	L 64–68	21–8 (13–3)	20 – Harris	11 – Herbert Harrigan	3 – Harris	Colonial Life Arena (18,000); Columbia, SC
SEC Women's Tournament
03/08/2019; 6:00 pm, SECN	(2) No. 12	vs. (10) Arkansas; Quarterfinals	L 89–95	21–9	27 – Herbert Harrigan	9 – Cliney	6 – Harris	Bon Secours Wellness Arena; Greenville, SC
NCAA Women's Tournament
03/22/2019*; 1:45 pm, ESPN2	(4 G) No. 15	(13 G) Belmont; First Round	W 74–52	22–9	15 – Cooper	9 – Jennings	6 – Harris	Dale F. Halton Arena†; Charlotte, NC
03/24/2019*; 2:00 pm, ESPN2	(4 G) No. 15	(5 G) No. 25 Florida State; Second Round	W 72–64	23–9	20 – Herbert Harrigan	7 – Jennings	4 – Tied	Dale F. Halton Arena† (2,030); Charlotte, NC
03/30/2019*; 2:00 pm, ESPN	(4 G) No. 15	vs. (1 G) No. 1 Baylor; Sweet Sixteen	L 68–93	23–10	17 – Cooper	5 – Herbert Harrigan	6 – Harris	Greensboro Coliseum; Greensboro, NC
*Non-conference game. ^{#}Rankings from AP Poll. (#) Tournament seedings in parentheses. G=Greensboro Region. All times are in Eastern Time.

†Colonial Life Arena was being used for the First and Second Rounds of the 2019 NCAA Division I men's basketball tournament, so South Carolina hosted their games at Dale F. Halton Arena in Charlotte, North Carolina.

== Rankings ==
Ranking movements Legend: ██ Increase in ranking ██ Decrease in ranking RV = Received votes т = Tied with team above or below
	Week																			
Poll	Pre	1	2	3	4	5	6	7	8	9	10	11	12	13	14	15	16	17	18	Final
AP	10	10	13	18	22	25	25	25	23	21	15	19	16	12	11	13	14	12	16	Not released
Coaches	11	11^	12	19	24	RV	RV	RV	RV	25	20	20	18	13	14	13	15-T	13	18	13

^Coaches' Poll did not release a second poll at the same time as the AP.
