= 2018–19 Texas A&M Aggies women's basketball team =

Intercollegiate basketball season

2018–19 Texas A&M Aggies women's basketball

Maui Jim Maui Classic champions

NCAA tournament, Sweet Sixteen
- Conference: Southeastern Conference

Ranking
- Coaches: No. 12
- AP: No. 14
- Record: 26–8 (12–4 SEC)
- Head coach: Gary Blair (16th season)
- Assistant coaches: Kelly Bond-White; Bob Starkey; Amy Wright
- Home arena: Reed Arena

2018–19 SEC women's basketball standings
	Conf.				Overall
Team	W		L	PCT	W		L	PCT
No. 4 Mississippi State †	15	–	1	.938	33	–	3	.917
No. 15 South Carolina	13	–	3	.813	23	–	9	.719
No. 14 Texas A&M	12	–	4	.750	26	–	7	.788
No. 17 Kentucky	11	–	5	.688	25	–	8	.758
Missouri	10	–	6	.625	24	–	11	.686
Auburn	9	–	7	.563	22	–	10	.688
Georgia	9	–	7	.563	18	–	12	.600
Tennessee	7	–	9	.438	19	–	13	.594
LSU	7	–	9	.438	16	–	13	.552
Arkansas	6	–	10	.375	22	–	15	.595
Alabama	5	–	11	.313	14	–	17	.452
Ole Miss	3	–	13	.188	9	–	22	.290
Florida	3	–	13	.188	8	–	23	.258
Vanderbilt	2	–	14	.125	7	–	23	.233
† 2019 SEC tournament winner Rankings from AP poll

The 2018–19 Texas A&M Aggies women's basketball team represented Texas A&M University in the 2018–19 NCAA Division I women's basketball season. The team's head coach is Gary Blair, in his sixteenth season at Texas A&M. The team played their home games at the Reed Arena in College Station, Texas and was in its seventh season as a member of the Southeastern Conference. They finished the season with a record of 26-8 (12-4 SEC). They advanced to the semifinals of the SEC Women's Tournament, where they were upset by Arkansas. They received an at-large bid to the NCAA Women's Tournament, where they defeated Wright State and Marquette in the first and second rounds, before losing to Notre Dame in the Sweet Sixteen for the 2nd straight year.

== Previous season ==
The Aggies finished the 2017–18 season 26–10, 11–5 in SEC play to finish in a four-way tie for fourth place. They advanced to the semifinals of the SEC women's tournament where they lost to Mississippi State. They received an at-large bid to the NCAA women's basketball tournament where they defeated Drake and DePaul in the first and second rounds before losing to Notre Dame in the sweet sixteen.

== Roster ==
2018–19 Texas A&M Aggies women's basketball team
Players
Coaches

Pos.	#	Name	Height	Year	Previous school	Hometown
F/C	0	Aja Ellison	6 ft 3 in (1.91 m)	RS Sr	Life Center Academy; Maryland	Voorhees, NJ
G	1	Aahliyah Jackson	5 ft 10 in (1.78 m)	So	Northside	Fort Smith, AR
G	2	Aaliyah Wilson	5 ft 11 in (1.8 m)	RS So	Muskogee; Arkansas	Muskogee, OK
G	3	Chennedy Carter	5 ft 7 in (1.7 m)	So	Mansfield Timberview	Mansfield, TX
G	4	Shambria Washington	5 ft 7 in (1.7 m)	Jr	Trinity Catholic; College of Central Florida	Ocala, FL
G	11	Kayla Wells	6 ft 0 in (1.83 m)	So	South Grand Prairie	Dallas, TX
F	12	Cheah Rael-Whitsitt	5 ft 11 in (1.8 m)	Jr	Huron; Miami Dade College	Ann Arbor, MI
G	14	Jada Walton	5 ft 11 in (1.8 m)	So	Southwest DeKalb	Lithonia, GA
G	15	Jasmine Williams	5 ft 10 in (1.78 m)	So	Cy-Woods	Houston, TX
G	23	Lauren Harrison (redshirt)	6 ft 0 in (1.83 m)	Jr	Concordia Lutheran; Texas Tech	The Woodlands, TX
F	31	N'dea Jones	6 ft 2 in (1.88 m)	So	Brookwood	Lawrenceville, GA
C	33	Anna Dreimane (redshirt)	6 ft 5 in (1.96 m)	Jr	Riga State Gymnasium No. 2 Colorado State	Riga, Latvia
F	34	Caylinne Martin	6 ft 3 in (1.91 m)	Sr	Langham Creek; McLennan CC	Houston, TX
C	40	Ciera Johnson	6 ft 4 in (1.93 m)	RS So	Duncanville; Louisville	Duncanville, TX

Head coach

- Gary Blair (Texas Tech)

Assistant coach(es)

- Kelly Bond-White (Illinois)
- Bob Starkey (LSU)
- Amy Wright (Arkansas)

Legend

- (C) Team captain
- (S) Suspended
- (I) Ineligible
- (W) Walk-on
- Injured
- Current redshirt

Roster
Last update: September 8, 2018

== Rankings ==
Regular season ranking movement Legend: ██ Increase in ranking. ██ Decrease in ranking. ██ Not ranked the previous week. RV=Received votes.
Poll	Pre- Season	Week 2	Week 3	Week 4	Week 5	Week 6	Week 7	Week 8	Week 9	Week 10	Week 11	Week 12	Week 13	Week 14	Week 15	Week 16	Week 17	Week 18	Week 19	Week 20	Final
AP	20	20	20	17	RV	RV	23	23	21	RV	RV	24	20	18	22	21	19	15	17	14	N/A
Coaches	21-T	-^	20-T	16	RV	RV	24	24	21	RV	RV	25	24	22	23	22	18	18	19	19	12

^Coaches' Poll did not release a second poll at the same time as the AP.

== Schedule ==
Date time, TV	Rank^{#}	Opponent^{#}	Result	Record	Site (attendance) city, state
Exhibition
11/02/2018*; 6:30 p.m.	No. 20	Oklahoma City	W 81–40		Reed Arena; College Station, TX
Non-Conference Games
11/07/2018*; 6:00 p.m.	No. 20	Rice	W 65–54	1–0	Reed Arena (4,043); College Station, TX
11/11/2018*; 6:00 p.m.	No. 20	Jacksonville	W 73–53	2–0	Reed Arena (3,012); College Station, TX
11/14/2018*; 6:00 p.m., ACCNE	No. 20	vs. No. 18 Syracuse	L 65–75	2–1	Westchester County Center (211); White Plains, NY
11/20/2018*; 6:30 p.m.	No. 20	at Little Rock	W 61–40	3–1	Jack Stephens Center (1,228); Little Rock, AR
11/23/2018*; 4:00 p.m.	No. 20	Arkansas State	W 97–56	4–1	Reed Arena (5,341); College Station, TX
11/29/2018*; 11:00 a.m.	No. 17	Lamar	L 68–74	4–2	Reed Arena (7,133); College Station, TX
12/06/2018*; 6:00 p.m., ESPN2		at Houston	W 68–52	5–2	Fertitta Center (2,107); Houston, TX
12/08/2018*; 2:00 p.m.		Central Arkansas	W 84–27	6–2	Reed Arena (3,154); College Station, TX
12/14/2018*; 9:30 p.m.		vs. UC Riverside; Maui Jim Maui Classic	W 70–63	7–2	Lahaina Civic Center; Maui, HI
12/15/2018*; 11:30 p.m.		vs. No. 8 Oregon State; Maui Jim Maui Classic	W 76–70	8–2	Lahaina Civic Center (1,083); Maui, HI
12/19/2018*; 5:00 p.m.	No. 23	USC	W 71–51	9–2	Reed Arena (3,269); College Station, TX
12/21/2018*; 6:30 p.m.	No. 23	Prairie View A&M	W 70–57	10–2	Reed Arena (3,209); College Station, TX
12/29/2018*; 12:00 p.m.	No. 23	UT Rio Grande Valley	W 84–61	11–2	Reed Arena (3,748); College Station, TX
SEC Conference Games
01/03/2019; 8:00 p.m., SECN	No. 21	No. 23 South Carolina	L 57–60	11–3 (0–1)	Reed Arena (4,010); College Station, TX
01/06/2019; 2:00 p.m.	No. 21	at LSU	L 52–63	11–4 (0–2)	Maravich Center (2,290); Baton Rouge, LA
01/10/2019; 7:00 p.m.		at Vanderbilt	W 50–43	12–4 (1–2)	Memorial Gymnasium (1,839); Nashville, TN
01/13/2019; 1:00 p.m., ESPNU		Alabama	W 70–43	13–4 (2–2)	Reed Arena (4,042); College Station, TX
01/20/2019; 3:00 p.m., ESPN2		at Georgia	W 76–66	14–4 (3–2)	Stegeman Coliseum (4,773); Athens, GA
01/24/2019; 7:30 p.m., SECN	No. 24	at Auburn	W 69–67	15–4 (4–2)	Auburn Arena (1,656); Auburn, AL
01/27/2019; 4:00 p.m., SECN	No. 24	No. 15 Kentucky	W 73–71	16–4 (5–2)	Reed Arena (4,752); College Station, TX
01/31/2019; 7:30 p.m., SECN	No. 20	Vanderbilt	W 69–53	17–4 (6–2)	Reed Arena (3,757); College Station, TX
02/03/2019; 2:00 p.m.	No. 20	at Ole Miss	W 72–60	18–4 (7–2)	The Pavilion at Ole Miss (1,591); Oxford, MS
02/07/2019; 6:00 p.m., SECN	No. 18	at Missouri	L 65–70 ^{OT}	18–5 (7–3)	Mizzou Arena (4,513); Columbia, MO
02/14/2019; 6:30 p.m.	No. 22	LSU	W 59–55	19–5 (8–3)	Reed Arena (3,704); College Station, TX
02/17/2019; 1:00 p.m., SECN	No. 22	No. 5 Mississippi State	L 64–92	19–6 (8–4)	Reed Arena (5,926); College Station, TX
02/21/2019; 8:00 p.m., SECN	No. 21	Tennessee	W 79–62	20–6 (9–4)	Reed Arena (3,789); College Station, TX
02/25/2019; 6:00 p.m., SECN	No. 19	at Florida	W 80–62	21–6 (10–4)	O'Connell Center (1,009); Gainesville, FL
02/28/2019; 6:00 p.m.	No. 19	at No. 11 Kentucky	W 62–55	22–6 (11–4)	Memorial Coliseum (4,532); Lexington, KY
03/03/2019; 4:00 p.m., SECN	No. 19	Arkansas	W 66–53	23–6 (12–4)	Reed Arena (3,609); College Station, TX
SEC Women's Tournament
03/08/2019; 7:30 p.m., SECN	(3) No. 15	vs. (6) Auburn; Quarterfinals	W 64–62	24–6	Bon Secours Wellness Arena (5,709); Greenville, SC
03/09/2019; 6:00 p.m., ESPNU	(3) No. 15	vs. (10) Arkansas; Semifinals	L 51–58	24–7	Bon Secours Wellness Arena (5,817); Greenville, SC
NCAA Women's Tournament
03/22/2019*; 3:30 p.m., ESPN2	(4 C) No. 14	(13 G) Wright State; First Round	W 84–61	25–7	Reed Arena (2,617); College Station, TX
03/24/2019*; 1:00 p.m., ESPN2	(4 C) No. 14	(5 G) No. 18 Marquette; Second Round	W 78–76	26–7	Reed Arena (2,767); College Station, TX
03/30/2019*; 3:00 p.m., ESPN2	(4 C) No. 14	vs. (1 C) No. 3 Notre Dame; Sweet Sixteen	L 80–87	26–8	Wintrust Arena; Chicago, IL
*Non-conference game. ^{#}Rankings from AP Poll. (#) Tournament seedings in parentheses. C=Chicago Region. All times are in Central Time.

== See also ==
- 2018–19 Texas A&M Aggies men's basketball team
