= 2018–19 Tennessee Lady Volunteers basketball team =

Intercollegiate basketball season

2018–19 Tennessee Lady Volunteers basketball

Junkanoo Jam Junkanoo Division Champions

NCAA tournament, first round
- Conference: Southeastern Conference
- Record: 19–13 (7–9 SEC)
- Head coach: Holly Warlick (7th season)
- Assistant coaches: Dean Lockwood; Sharrona Reaves; Bridgette Gordon
- Home arena: Thompson–Boling Arena

2018–19 SEC women's basketball standings
	Conf.				Overall
Team	W		L	PCT	W		L	PCT
No. 4 Mississippi State †	15	–	1	.938	33	–	3	.917
No. 15 South Carolina	13	–	3	.813	23	–	9	.719
No. 14 Texas A&M	12	–	4	.750	26	–	7	.788
No. 17 Kentucky	11	–	5	.688	25	–	8	.758
Missouri	10	–	6	.625	24	–	11	.686
Auburn	9	–	7	.563	22	–	10	.688
Georgia	9	–	7	.563	18	–	12	.600
Tennessee	7	–	9	.438	19	–	13	.594
LSU	7	–	9	.438	16	–	13	.552
Arkansas	6	–	10	.375	22	–	15	.595
Alabama	5	–	11	.313	14	–	17	.452
Ole Miss	3	–	13	.188	9	–	22	.290
Florida	3	–	13	.188	8	–	23	.258
Vanderbilt	2	–	14	.125	7	–	23	.233
† 2019 SEC tournament winner Rankings from AP poll

The 2018–19 Tennessee Lady Volunteers basketball team represented the University of Tennessee in the 2018–19 college basketball season. The Lady Vols, led by seventh-year head coach Holly Warlick, played their games at Thompson–Boling Arena and are members of the Southeastern Conference.

The Lady Vols finished the season 19–13, 7–9 for a seventh-place tie in SEC play. They lost in the quarterfinals of the SEC tournament to Mississippi State. They received an at-large bid to the NCAA tournament where they lost to UCLA in the first round. At the completion of the season, Warlick was fired as head coach. Missouri State's Kellie Harper, who was a point guard during Tennessee's 3-peat from 1996 to 1998, was hired as her replacement on April 8.

== Roster ==
2018–19 Tennessee Lady Volunteers women's basketball team
Players
Coaches

Pos.	#	Name	Height	Year	Previous school	Hometown
G/F	0	Rennia Davis	6 ft 2 in (1.88 m)	So	Jean Ribault HS	Jacksonville, FL
G	1	Anastasia Hayes	5 ft 7 in (1.7 m)	So	Riverdale HS	Murfreesboro, TN
G	2	Evina Westbrook	6 ft 0 in (1.83 m)	So	South Salem HS	Salem, OR
F	4	Mimi Collins	6 ft 3 in (1.91 m)	Fr	Paul VI Catholic HS	Waldorf, MD
C	5	Kamera Harris	6 ft 3 in (1.91 m)	Jr	Dutchtown HS	Hampton, GA
G/F	10	Meme Jackson	5 ft 11 in (1.8 m)	Sr	Blackman HS	Murfreesboro, TN
C	11	Kasiyahna Kushkituah	6 ft 4 in (1.93 m)	So	St. Francis HS	Atlanta, GA
G/F	12	Rae Burrell	6 ft 1 in (1.85 m)	Fr	Liberty HS	Henderson, NV
G	13	Jazmine Massengill	6 ft 0 in (1.83 m)	Fr	Hamilton Heights Christian Academy	Chattanooga, TN
G	14	Zaay Green	6 ft 0 in (1.83 m)	Fr	Duncanville HS	Duncanville, TX
F	15	Cheridene Green	6 ft 3 in (1.91 m)	RS Sr	Harris Academy Beckenham; ASA College	London, England, UK
F	21	Lou Brown	6 ft 3 in (1.91 m)	RS Sr	Australian Institute of Sport	Melbourne, AUS

Head coach

- Holly Warlick (Tennessee)

Assistant coach(es)

- Dean Lockwood (Army)
- Sharrona Reaves (Alabama)
- Bridgette Gordon (Tennessee)

Legend

- (C) Team captain
- (S) Suspended
- (I) Ineligible
- (W) Walk-on
- Injured
- Current redshirt

Roster

== Rankings ==
Ranking movements Legend: ██ Increase in ranking ██ Decrease in ranking — = Not ranked RV = Received votes т = Tied with team above or below
	Week																			
Poll	Pre	1	2	3	4	5	6	7	8	9	10	11	12	13	14	15	16	17	18	Final
AP	11	12	11	11	9	9	9	10	10	13	20-T	RV	—	—	—	—	—	—	—	Not released
Coaches	12	12^	11	11	9	9	8	10	10	13	17	RV	—	—	—	—	—	—	—	

^Coaches' Poll did not release a second poll at the same time as the AP.

== Schedule and results ==
Date time, TV	Rank^{#}	Opponent^{#}	Result	Record	High points	High rebounds	High assists	Site (attendance) city, state
Exhibition
11/05/2018*; 7:00 pm	No. 11	Carson-Newman	W 128–59		28 – Z. Green	10 – Collins	8 – Westbrook	Thompson–Boling Arena (3,267); Knoxville, TN
Regular season
11/11/2018*; 2:00 pm	No. 11	Presbyterian	W 97–49	1–0	20 – Westbrook	11 – C. Green	5 – Westbrook	Thompson–Boling Arena (8,147); Knoxville, TN
11/14/2018*; 7:00 pm	No. 12	UNC Asheville	W 73–46	2–0	13 – Jackson	8 – Tied	4 – Westbrook	Thompson–Boling Arena (6,914); Knoxville, TN
11/18/2018*; 2:00 pm	No. 12	Florida A&M	W 96–31	3–0	19 – Jackson	11 – Davis	8 – Westbrook	Thompson–Boling Arena (7,616); Knoxville, TN
11/22/2018*; 3:00 pm	No. 11	vs. Clemson; Junkanoo Jam Junkanoo Division semifinals	W 78–66	4–0	14 – Jackson	9 – Tied	5 – Westbrook	Gateway Christian Academy (320); Bimini, Bahamas
11/24/2018*; 2:00 pm	No. 11	vs. UAB; Junkanoo Jam Junkanoo Division championship	W 73–69 ^{OT}	5–0	18 – Davis	13 – Kushkituah	3 – Tied	Gateway Christian Academy (250); Bimini, Bahamas
12/02/2018*; 4:00 pm, FS1	No. 11	at Oklahoma State; Big 12/SEC Women's Challenge	W 76–63	6–0	29 – Westbrook	13 – C. Green	3 – Tied	Gallagher-Iba Arena (3,493); Stillwater, OK
12/05/2018*; 7:00 pm	No. 9	Stetson	W 65–55	7–0	24 – Davis	9 – Davis	4 – Westbrook	Thompson–Boling Arena (6,916); Knoxville, TN
12/09/2018*; 1:00 pm, ESPN2	No. 9	at No. 12 Texas	W 88–82	8–0	33 – Jackson	6 – Tied	6 – Westbrook	Frank Erwin Center (4,275); Austin, TX
12/18/2018*; 6:00 pm, SECN	No. 9	No. 8 Stanford; Rivalry	L 85–95	8–1	29 – Westbrook	10 – Davis	10 – Westbrook	Thompson–Boling Arena (8,051); Knoxville, TN
12/21/2018*; 7:00 pm	No. 9	ETSU	W 80–61	9–1	23 – Jackson	9 – Massengill	9 – Westbrook	Thompson–Boling Arena (8,025); Knoxville, TN
12/28/2018*; 7:00 pm	No. 10	Murray State	W 98–77	10–1	20 – Davis	13 – Davis	8 – Massengill	Thompson–Boling Arena (8,518); Knoxville, TN
12/30/2018*; 2:00 pm	No. 10	Belmont	W 84–76	11–1	20 – Westbrook	8 – Tied	7 – Westbrook	Thompson–Boling Arena (8,546); Knoxville, TN
01/03/2019; 7:00 pm	No. 10	at Auburn	W 78–69	12–1 (1–0)	27 – Jackson	14 – Davis	7 – Z. Green	Auburn Arena (2,204); Auburn, AL
01/06/2019; 2:00 pm, ESPN2	No. 10	Missouri	L 64–66	12–2 (1–1)	16 – Westbrook	14 – C. Green	3 – Westbrook	Thompson–Boling Arena (9,113); Knoxville, TN
01/10/2019; 7:00 pm, SECN	No. 13	No. 16 Kentucky; Rivalry	L 71–73	12–3 (1–2)	20 – Westbrook	15 – C. Green	6 – Jackson	Thompson–Boling Arena (8,145); Knoxville, TN
01/13/2019; 3:00 pm, ESPN	No. 13	at Georgia	L 62–66	12–4 (1–3)	23 – Westbrook	12 – Davis	6 – Westbrook	Stegeman Coliseum (5,867); Athens, GA
01/17/2019; 9:00 pm, SECN	No. 20	at Alabama	L 65–86	12–5 (1–4)	19 – Westbrook	11 – Z. Green	5 – Westbrook	Coleman Coliseum (2,392); Tuscaloosa, AL
01/21/2019; 7:00 pm, SECN		Arkansas	L 79–80	12–6 (1–5)	24 – Westbrook	12 – C. Green	5 – Westbrook	Thompson–Boling Arena (7,259); Knoxville, TN
01/24/2019*; 7:00 pm, ESPN		No. 1 Notre Dame	L 62–77	12–7	19 – Z. Green	11 – C. Green	5 – Z. Green	Thompson–Boling Arena (9,154); Knoxville, TN
01/27/2019; 1:00 pm, SECN		LSU	W 74–65	13–7 (2–5)	24 – Davis	10 – C. Green	6 – Westbrook	Thompson–Boling Arena (9,518); Knoxville, TN
01/31/2019; 7:00 pm		Florida	W 67–50	14–7 (3–5)	19 – Davis	10 – Tied	7 – Westbrook	Thompson–Boling Arena (6,233); Knoxville, TN
02/03/2019; 3:00 pm, ESPN2		at Vanderbilt; Rivalry	W 82–65	15–7 (4–5)	18 – Westbrook	12 – Davis	5 – Westbrook	Memorial Gymnasium (3,815); Nashville, TN
02/10/2019; 2:00 pm, ESPN		at No. 6 Mississippi State	L 63–91	15–8 (4–6)	29 – Davis	7 – C. Green	2 – Tied	Humphrey Coliseum (10,021); Starkville, MS
02/14/2019; 7:00 pm		Auburn	W 73–62	16–8 (5–6)	25 – Z. Green	11 – C. Green	10 – Westbrook	Thompson–Boling Arena (7,547); Knoxville, TN
02/17/2019; 5:00 pm, ESPN2		at Missouri	W 62–60	17–8 (6–6)	18 – Westbrook	11 – Davis	6 – Westbrook	Mizzou Arena (8,559); Columbia, MO
02/21/2019; 9:00 pm, SECN		at No. 21 Texas A&M	L 62–79	17–9 (6–7)	17 – Westbrook	15 – C. Green	5 – Westbrook	Reed Arena (3,789); College Station, TX
02/24/2019; 4:00 pm, ESPN2		No. 13 South Carolina	L 67–82	17–10 (6–8)	15 – Davis	9 – Tied	2 – Tied	Thompson–Boling Arena (9,448); Knoxville, TN
02/28/2019; 7:00 pm, SECN		Vanderbilt; Rivalry	L 69–76	17–11 (6–9)	20 – C. Green	8 – C. Green	5 – Jackson	Thompson–Boling Arena (7,321); Knoxville, TN
03/03/2019; 3:00 pm		at Ole Miss	W 81–56	18–11 (7–9)	20 – Jackson	8 – Z. Green	9 – Westbrook	The Pavilion at Ole Miss (1,308); Oxford, MS
SEC Women's Tournament
03/07/2019; 12:00 pm, SECN	(8)	vs. (9) LSU; Second Round	W 69–66	19–11	20 – Westbrook	9 – C. Green	3 – Davis	Bon Secours Wellness Arena (3,215); Greenville, SC
03/08/2019; 12:00 pm, SECN	(8)	vs. (1) No. 5 Mississippi State; Quarterfinals	L 68–83	19–12	19 – Westbrook	8 – Davis	6 – Westbrook	Bon Secours Wellness Arena (4,431); Greenville, SC
NCAA Women's Tournament
03/23/2019*; 1:00 pm, ESPN2	(11 A)	vs. (6 A) No. 20 UCLA; First Round	L 77–89	19–13	21 – Davis	10 – Davis	9 – Westbrook	Xfinity Center (5,072); College Park, MD
*Non-conference game. ^{#}Rankings from AP Poll. (#) Tournament seedings in parentheses. A=Albany Region. All times are in Eastern Time.

== See also ==
- 2018–19 Tennessee Volunteers basketball team
