= 2018–19 LSU Lady Tigers basketball team =

Intercollegiate basketball season

2018–19 LSU Lady Tigers basketball
- Conference: Southeastern Conference
- Record: 16–13 (7–9 SEC)
- Head coach: Nikki Fargas (8th season)
- Assistant coaches: Tasha Butts; Aaron Kallhoff; Charlene Thomas-Swinson
- Home arena: Pete Maravich Assembly Center

2018–19 SEC women's basketball standings
	Conf.				Overall
Team	W		L	PCT	W		L	PCT
No. 4 Mississippi State †	15	–	1	.938	33	–	3	.917
No. 15 South Carolina	13	–	3	.813	23	–	9	.719
No. 14 Texas A&M	12	–	4	.750	26	–	7	.788
No. 17 Kentucky	11	–	5	.688	25	–	8	.758
Missouri	10	–	6	.625	24	–	11	.686
Auburn	9	–	7	.563	22	–	10	.688
Georgia	9	–	7	.563	18	–	12	.600
Tennessee	7	–	9	.438	19	–	13	.594
LSU	7	–	9	.438	16	–	13	.552
Arkansas	6	–	10	.375	22	–	15	.595
Alabama	5	–	11	.313	14	–	17	.452
Ole Miss	3	–	13	.188	9	–	22	.290
Florida	3	–	13	.188	8	–	23	.258
Vanderbilt	2	–	14	.125	7	–	23	.233
† 2019 SEC tournament winner Rankings from AP poll

The 2018–19 LSU Lady Tigers basketball team represented Louisiana State University during the 2018–19 NCAA Division I women's basketball season college basketball season. The Lady Tigers, led by eighth-year head coach Nikki Fargas, played their home games at Pete Maravich Assembly Center and were members of the Southeastern Conference.

The Lady Tigers finished the season 16–13, 7–9 in SEC play. As a 6th seed, they lost in the second round of the SEC women's tournament to Tennessee. They missed being selected for the NCAA Division I Tournament and were invited to play in the Women's National Invitation Tournament but declined.

== Previous season ==
The Lady Tigers finished the 2017–18 season 19–10, 11–5 in SEC play to finish in a four-way tie for fourth place. As a 4th seed, they lost in the quarterfinals of the SEC women's tournament to Texas A&M. They received an at-large bid to the NCAA women's tournament where were upset by Central Michigan in the first round.

== Roster ==
2018–19 LSU Tigers women's basketball team
Players
Coaches

Pos.	#	Name	Height	Year	Previous school	Hometown
G	1	Jailin Cherry	5 ft 9 in (1.75 m)	So	Pascagoula HS	Pascagoula, MS
G	2	Shanice Norton	5 ft 8 in (1.73 m)	Sr	Potter's House Christian Academy	London, England
G	3	Khayla Pointer	5 ft 7 in (1.7 m)	So	Holy Innocents' Episcopal	Kennesaw, GA
F	4	Raven Farley	6 ft 4 in (1.93 m)	So	Queen of Peace HS	Elizabeth, NJ
F	5	Ayana Mitchell	6 ft 2 in (1.88 m)	Jr	Salem HS	Conyers, GA
F	10	Monet Jones	6 ft 2 in (1.88 m)	Fr	Lawrence E. Elkins HS	Missouri City, TX
G/F	12	Mercedes Brooks	6 ft 0 in (1.83 m)	Jr	Rider HS; Trinity Valley CC	Wichita Falls, TX
G	13	Jaelyn Richard-Harris	5 ft 4 in (1.63 m)	Jr	Dekaney HS	Houston, TX
G	14	LaToya Ashman	5 ft 10 in (1.78 m)	Jr	Wellington HS; FSW State	Wellington, FL
C	15	Yasmine Bidikuindila	6 ft 6 in (1.98 m)	Jr	Champlain College	Montreal, QE
G	23	Karli Seay	5 ft 8 in (1.73 m)	So	Homewood-Flossmor HS; Western Nebraska CC	Flossmoor, IL
C	24	Faustine Aifuwa	6 ft 5 in (1.96 m)	RS So	Dacula HS	Dacula, GA
G	25	Rakell Spencer	5 ft 11 in (1.8 m)	RS So	Cabrini HS; Texas A&M	New Orleans, LA
F	32	Jalaysha Thomas	6 ft 2 in (1.88 m)	So	West Port HS; Florida	Ocala, FL

Head coach

- Nikki Fargas (Tennessee)

Assistant coach(es)

- Tasha Butts (Tennessee)
- Aaron Kallhoff (Bemidji State)
- Charlene Thomas-Swinson (Auburn)

Legend

- (C) Team captain
- (S) Suspended
- (I) Ineligible
- (W) Walk-on
- Injured
- Current redshirt

Roster
Last update: September 16, 2018

== Schedule ==
Date time, TV	Rank^{#}	Opponent^{#}	Result	Record	Site (attendance) city, state
Exhibition
November 2, 2018*; 6:00 pm		Loyola (New Orleans)	W 64–29		Maravich Center; Baton Rouge, LA
Non-conference regular season
November 6, 2018*; 5:30 pm		Sam Houston State	W 66–52	1–0	Maravich Center (1,891); Baton Rouge, LA
November 11, 2018*; 1:00 pm		Northern Colorado	W 62–57	2–0	Maravich Center (1,805); Baton Rouge, LA
November 15, 2018*; 6:30 pm		Tulane	L 54–56	2–1	Maravich Center (1,511); Baton Rouge, LA
November 18, 2018*; 1:00 pm, ACCN Extra		at Florida State	W 58–45	3–1	Donald L. Tucker Center (3,002); Tallahassee, FL
November 25, 2018*; 2:00 pm		Little Rock	W 60–45	4–1	Maravich Center (1,629); Baton Rouge, LA
November 29, 2018*; 6:00 pm, SECN		Kansas; Big 12/SEC Women's Challenge	L 61–68	4–2	Maravich Center (1,604); Baton Rouge, LA
December 11, 2018*; 11:00 am		McNeese State	W 86–36	5–2	Maravich Center (6,528); Baton Rouge, LA
December 15, 2018*; 3:00 pm, BTN		at Rutgers	L 43–57	5–3	Louis Brown Athletic Center (1,726); Piscataway, NJ
December 18, 2018*; 6:30 pm		Nicholls	W 76–44	6–3	Maravich Center (1,492); Baton Rouge, LA
December 20, 2018*; 6:30 pm, CST		at Louisiana	W 76–54	7–3	Cajundome (1,448); Lafayette, LA
December 27, 2018*; 6:30 pm		Southeastern Louisiana	W 72–52	8–3	Maravich Center (1,654); Baton Rouge, LA
December 30, 2018*; 3:00 pm, SECN		South Florida	W 78–49	9–3	Maravich Center (2,270); Baton Rouge, LA
SEC regular season
January 3, 2019; 6:00 pm		at Georgia	L 50–63	9–4 (0–1)	Stegeman Coliseum (2,506); Athens, GA
January 6, 2019; 2:00 pm		No. 21 Texas A&M	W 64–52	10–4 (1–1)	Maravich Center (2,290); Baton Rouge, LA
January 10, 2019; 6:00 pm		at Ole Miss	W 55–41	11–4 (2–1)	The Pavilion at Ole Miss (1,247); Oxford, MS
January 13, 2019; 4:00 pm, SECN		No. 21 South Carolina	L 53–76	11–5 (2–2)	Maravich Center (2,997); Baton Rouge, LA
January 17, 2019; 6:30 pm		No. 16 Kentucky	L 60–64	11–6 (2–3)	Maravich Center (1,452); Baton Rouge, LA
January 20, 2018; 1:00 pm, SECN		at Alabama	W 62–56	12–6 (3–3)	Coleman Coliseum (2,630); Tuscaloosa, AL
January 27, 2019; 12:00 pm, SECN		at Tennessee	L 65–74	12–7 (3–4)	Thompson–Boling Arena (9,518); Knoxville, TN
January 31, 2019; 6:30 pm		No. 6 Mississippi State	L 35–68	12–8 (3–5)	Maravich Center (2,214); Baton Rouge, LA
February 4, 2019; 6:00 pm, SECN		Missouri	W 61–51	13–8 (4–5)	Maravich Center (1,756); Baton Rouge, LA
February 7, 2019; 8:00 pm, SECN		Arkansas	W 71–34	14–8 (5–5)	Maravich Center (1,599); Baton Rouge, LA
February 14, 2019; 6:30 pm		at No. 22 Texas A&M	L 55–59	14–9 (5–6)	Reed Arena (3,704); College Station, TX
February 17, 2019; 5:00 pm, SECN		at Vanderbilt	W 79–68	15–9 (6–6)	Memorial Gymnasium (2,907); Nashville, TN
February 21, 2019; 6:30 pm		Florida	W 69–51	16–9 (7–6)	Maravich Center (1,573); Baton Rouge, LA
February 24,2019; 1:00 pm		at No. 16 Kentucky	L 52–57	16–10 (7–7)	Memorial Coliseum (6,911); Lexington, KY
February 28, 2019; 7:00 pm		at No. 5 Mississippi State	L 56–76	16–11 (7–8)	Humphrey Coliseum (8,631); Starkville, MS
February 3, 2019; 2:00 pm		Auburn	L 46–56	16–12 (7–9)	Maravich Center (2,607); Baton Rouge, LA
SEC Women's Tournament
February 7, 2019; 11:00 am, SECN	(9)	vs. (8) Tennessee; Second Round	L 66–69	16–13	Bon Secours Wellness Arena; Greenville, SC
*Non-conference game. ^{#}Rankings from AP Poll. (#) Tournament seedings in parentheses. All times are in Central Time.

== Rankings ==
Ranking movements Legend: ██ Increase in ranking ██ Decrease in ranking — = Not ranked RV = Received votes
	Week																			
Poll	Pre	1	2	3	4	5	6	7	8	9	10	11	12	13	14	15	16	17	18	Final
AP	—	—	—	RV	—															Not released
Coaches	—	—^	—	—																

^Coaches' Poll did not release a second poll at the same time as the AP.
