= 2018–19 Mississippi State Bulldogs women's basketball team =

Intercollegiate basketball season

2018–19 Mississippi State Bulldogs women's basketball

SEC regular-season champions SEC tournament champions

NCAA tournament, Elite Eight
- Conference: Southeastern Conference

Ranking
- Coaches: No. 5
- AP: No. 4
- Record: 33–3 (15–1 SEC)
- Head coach: Vic Schaefer (7th season)
- Assistant coaches: Johnnie Harris; Dionnah Jackson-Durrett; Elena Lovato
- Home arena: Humphrey Coliseum

2018–19 SEC women's basketball standings
	Conf.				Overall
Team	W		L	PCT	W		L	PCT
No. 4 Mississippi State †	15	–	1	.938	33	–	3	.917
No. 15 South Carolina	13	–	3	.813	23	–	9	.719
No. 14 Texas A&M	12	–	4	.750	26	–	7	.788
No. 17 Kentucky	11	–	5	.688	25	–	8	.758
Missouri	10	–	6	.625	24	–	11	.686
Auburn	9	–	7	.563	22	–	10	.688
Georgia	9	–	7	.563	18	–	12	.600
Tennessee	7	–	9	.438	19	–	13	.594
LSU	7	–	9	.438	16	–	13	.552
Arkansas	6	–	10	.375	22	–	15	.595
Alabama	5	–	11	.313	14	–	17	.452
Ole Miss	3	–	13	.188	9	–	22	.290
Florida	3	–	13	.188	8	–	23	.258
Vanderbilt	2	–	14	.125	7	–	23	.233
† 2019 SEC tournament winner Rankings from AP poll

The 2018–19 Mississippi State Bulldogs women's basketball team represented Mississippi State University during the 2018–19 NCAA Division I women's basketball season. The Bulldogs, led by seventh-year head coach Vic Schaefer, played their |home games at Humphrey Coliseum in Starkville, Mississippi as members of the Southeastern Conference (SEC).

The Bulldogs were coming off a runner-up finish to Notre Dame for the national championship in which they lost 58–61.

== Roster ==
2018–19 Mississippi State Bulldogs women's basketball team
Players
Coaches

Pos.	#	Name	Height	Year	Previous school	Hometown
G	1	Myah Taylor	5 ft 7 in (1.7 m)		Olive Branch HS	Olive Branch, MS
G	2	Andra Espinoza-Hunter	5 ft 11 in (1.8 m)	So	Ossining HS; UConn	Ossining, NY
F/C	4	Jessika Carter	6 ft 5 in (1.96 m)	Fr	Harris County HS	Waverly Hall, GA
F	5	Anriel Howard	5 ft 11 in (1.8 m)	Sr	Westlake HS; Texas A&M	Atlanta, GA
G	10	Jazzmun Holmes	5 ft 8 in (1.73 m)	Sr	Harrison Central HS	Gulfport, MS
G	11	Xaria Wiggins	6 ft 1 in (1.85 m)	Fr	Princess Anne HS	Virginia Beach, VA
G	12	Jacaira Allen	5 ft 10 in (1.78 m)		Dillard HS	Pompano Beach, FL
C	13	Promise Taylor (redshirt)	6 ft 5 in (1.96 m)	So	Sammamish HS; Ole Miss	Issaquah, WA
C	15	Teaira McCowan	6 ft 7 in (2.01 m)	Sr	Brenham HS	Brenham, TX
G	20	Nyah Tate	6 ft 0 in (1.83 m)	So	Terry HS	Terry, MS
C	21	Daphane White	6 ft 5 in (1.96 m)	Fr	St. Martin HS	Ocean Springs, MS
G	23	Bre'Amber Scott	5 ft 11 in (1.8 m)	So	Central HS	Little Rock, AR
G	24	Jordan Danberry	5 ft 8 in (1.73 m)	Sr	Conway HS; Arkansas	Conway, AR
C	25	Zion Campbell (redshirt)	6 ft 3 in (1.91 m)	So	Riverdale Baptist School	Washington, D.C.
F	55	Chloe Bibby	6 ft 1 in (1.85 m)	So	Rowville Secondary	Warracknabeal, Australia

Head coach

- Vic Schaefer (Texas A&M)

Assistant coach(es)

- Johnnie Harris (Arkansas Baptist)
- Dionnah Jackson-Durrett (Oklahoma)
- Elena Lovato (Pittsburg State)

Legend

- (C) Team captain
- (S) Suspended
- (I) Ineligible
- (W) Walk-on
- Injured
- Current redshirt

Roster
Last update: March 22, 2025

== Rankings ==
Ranking movements Legend: ██ Increase in ranking ██ Decrease in ranking
	Week																			
Poll	Pre	1	2	3	4	5	6	7	8	9	10	11	12	13	14	15	16	17	18	Final
AP	6	6	6	6	6	5	4	8	7	7	7	7	6	6	5	6	5	5	4	Not released
Coaches	6	6^	6	6	6	5	4	7	6	6	6	6	6	6	5	6	5	5	4	5

^Coaches' Poll did not release a second poll at the same time as the AP.

== Schedule ==
Date time, TV	Rank^{#}	Opponent^{#}	Result	Record	High points	High rebounds	High assists	Site (attendance) city, state
Exhibition
November 2, 2018*; 6:00 p.m.	No. 6	Central Missouri	W 97–56		23 – Howard	11 – Howard	5 – Holmes	Humphrey Coliseum (4,205); Starkville, MS
Non-conference regular season
November 6, 2018*; 7:00 p.m.	No. 6	Southeast Missouri State	W 88–53	1–0	24 – McCowan	17 – McCowan	6 – Taylor	Humphrey Coliseum (6,373); Starkville, MS
November 9, 2018*; 6:00 p.m.	No. 6	at Virginia	W 72–44	2–0	13 – tied	12 – McCowan	4 – Holmes	John Paul Jones Arena (4,453); Charlottesville, VA
November 15, 2018*; 7:00 p.m.	No. 6	Lamar	W 104–53	3–0	24 – Howard	16 – McCowan	9 – Holmes	Humphrey Coliseum (7,107); Starkville, MS
November 18, 2018*; 2:00 p.m.	No. 6	Coppin State	W 110–38	4–0	23 – McCowan	8 – tied	7 – Danberry	Humphrey Coliseum (7,320); Starkville, MS
November 21, 2018*; 7:00 p.m.	No. 6	Furman	W 106–41	5–0	24 – McCowan	10 – McCowan	6 – tied	Humphrey Coliseum (6,970); Starkville, MS
November 24, 2018*; 2:00 p.m.	No. 6	Jackson State	W 105–38	6–0	19 – McCowan	8 – Carter	6 – Taylor	Humphrey Coliseum (6,953); Starkville, MS
November 28, 2018*; 6:30 p.m.	No. 6	at Little Rock	W 98–63	7–0	23 – McCowan	15 – McCowan	6 – Howard	Jack Stephens Center (2,261); Little Rock, AR
December 2, 2018*; 1:00 p.m., FS1	No. 6	at No. 10 Texas; Big 12/SEC Women's Challenge	W 67–49	8–0	17 – Holmes	12 – McCowan	2 – tied	Frank Erwin Center (4,579); Austin, TX
December 6, 2018*; 7:00 p.m.	No. 6	No. 18 Marquette	W 87–82	9–0	29 – Howard	18 – McCowan	13 – Holmes	Humphrey Coliseum (7,273); Starkville, MS
December 14, 2018*; 6:00 p.m.	No. 5	at Southern Miss	W 86–42	10–0	16 – Howard	16 – McCowan	6 – Holmes	Reed Green Coliseum (4,448); Hattiesburg, MS
December 18, 2018*; 9:00 p.m., ESPN2	No. 4	at No. 7 Oregon	L 74–82	10–1	30 – Howard	11 – McCowan	7 – Holmes	Matthew Knight Arena (8,951); Eugene, OR
December 20, 2018*; 9:00 p.m.	No. 4	at Washington	W 103–56	11–1	20 – Danberry	13 – McCowan	4 – tied	Alaska Airlines Arena (1,669); Seattle, WA
December 20, 2018*; 2:00 p.m.	No. 8	Louisiana	W 104–36	12–1	16 – Howard	16 – McCowan	6 – Holmes	Humphrey Coliseum (10,242); Starkville, MS
SEC regular season
January 3, 2019; 6:00 p.m., SECN	No. 7	at Arkansas	W 93–69	13–1 (1–0)	26 – Danberry	22 – McCowan	5 – Holmes	Bud Walton Arena (2,263); Fayetteville, AR
January 6, 2019; 4:00 p.m., SECN	No. 7	No. 16 Kentucky	W 86–71	14–1 (2–0)	21 – Howard	12 – Howard	5 – Holmes	Humphrey Coliseum (8,830); Starkville, MS
January 10, 2019; 8:00 p.m., SECN	No. 7	Georgia	W 80–71	15–1 (3–0)	24 – Bibby	21 – McCowan	5 – Holmes	Humphrey Coliseum (6,493); Starkville, MS
January 14, 2019; 6:00 p.m., SECN	No. 7	at Auburn	W 85–59	16–1 (4–0)	22 – McCowan	10 – McCowan	5 – tied	Auburn Arena (1,908); Auburn, AL
January 17, 2019; 6:00 p.m., ESPN	No. 7	No. 15 South Carolina	W 89–74	17–1 (5–0)	26 – McCowan	24 – McCowan	7 – Danberry	Humphrey Coliseum (10,006); Starkville, MS
January 24, 2019; 6:00 p.m.	No. 7	at Florida	W 90–42	18–1 (6–0)	21 – Howard	8 – Howard	6 – Holmes	O'Connell Center (1,242); Gainesville, FL
January 27, 2019; 2:00 p.m., SECN	No. 7	Ole Miss	W 80–49	19–1 (7–0)	33 – McCowan	13 – McCowan	7 – Danberry	Humphrey Coliseum (10,337); Starkville, MS
January 31, 2019; 6:30 p.m.	No. 6	at LSU	W 68–35	20–1 (8–0)	16 – Espinoza-Hunter	20 – McCowan	5 – Holmes	Pete Maravich Assembly Center (2,214); Baton Rouge, LA
February 3, 2019; 12:00 p.m., SECN	No. 6	at Alabama	W 65–49	21–1 (9–0)	24 – Howard	12 – McCowan	3 – Holmes	Coleman Coliseum (3,769); Tuscaloosa, AL
February 10, 2019; 1:00 p.m., ESPN	No. 6	Tennessee	W 91–63	22–1 (10–0)	24 – McCowan	15 – McCowan	8 – Holmes	Humphrey Coliseum (10,021); Starkville, MS
February 14, 2019; 8:00 p.m., SECN	No. 5	Missouri	L 67–75	22–2 (10–1)	21 – Howard	13 – McCowan	7 – Holmes	Humphrey Coliseum (7,545); Starkville, MS
February 17, 2019; 1:00 p.m., SECN	No. 5	at No. 22 Texas A&M	W 92–64	23–2 (11–1)	24 – Espinoza-Hunter	13 – Howard	6 – Holmes	Reed Arena (5,926); College Station, TX
February 21, 2019; 7:00 p.m.	No. 6	at Ole Miss	W 80–66	24–2 (12–1)	21 – Howard	12 – McCowan	7 – Holmes	The Pavilion at Ole Miss (4,125); Oxford, MS
February 24, 2019; 1:00 p.m., SECN	No. 6	Vanderbilt	W 86–70	25–2 (13–1)	23 – McCowan	10 – Howard	6 – Holmes	Humphrey Coliseum (9,566); Starkville, MS
February 28, 2019; 7:00 p.m.	No. 5	LSU	W 76–56	26–2 (14–1)	25 – McCowan	13 – MCowan	4 – Holmes	Humphrey Coliseum (8,631); Starkville, MS
March 3, 2019; 1:00 p.m., ESPN2	No. 5	at No. 14 South Carolina	W 68–64	27–2 (15–1)	18 – McCowan	17 – McCowan	6 – Danberry	Colonial Life Arena (18,000); Columbia, SC
SEC women's tournament
March 8, 2019; 11:00 a.m., SECN	(1) No. 5	vs. (8) Tennessee; Quarterfinals	W 83–68	28–2	26 – Howard	13 – McCowan	4 – Danberry	Bon Secours Wellness Arena (4,431); Greenville, SC
March 9, 2019; 4:00 p.m., ESPNU	(1) No. 5	vs. (5) Missouri; Semifinals	W 71–56	29–2	27 – McCowan	16 – McCowan	5 – Danberry	Bon Secours Wellness Arena; Greenville, SC
March 10, 2019; 1:00 p.m., ESPN2	(1) No. 5	vs. (10) Arkansas; Championship game	W 101–70	30–2	24 – tied	14 – McCowan	12 – Holmes	Bon Secours Wellness Arena (5,771); Greenville, SC
NCAA women's tournament
March 22, 2019*; 8:30 p.m., ESPN2	(1 P) No. 4	(16 P) Southern; First round	W 103–46	31–2	23 – Howard	16 – McCowan	3 – Holmes	Humphrey Coliseum (9,967); Starkville, MS
March 24, 2019*; 8:00 p.m., ESPN	(1 P) No. 4	(9 P) Clemson; Second round	W 85–61	32–2	30 – McCowan	14 – Howard	7 – Holmes	Humphrey Coliseum (9,944); Starkville, MS
March 29, 2019*; 8:00 p.m., ESPN2	(1 P) No. 4	vs. (5 P) No. 22 Arizona State; Sweet Sixteen	W 76–53	33–2	22 – McCowan	13 – McCowan	7 – Holmes	Moda Center; Portland, OR
March 31, 2019*; 1:00 p.m., ESPN	(1 P) No. 4	vs. (3 P) No. 7 Oregon; Elite Eight	L 84–88	33–3	19 – McCowan	15 – McCowan	13 – Holmes	Moda Center (11,538); Portland, OR
*Non-conference game. ^{#}Rankings from AP poll. (#) Tournament seedings in parentheses. P=Portland Region. All times are in Central.

== See also ==
- 2018–19 Mississippi State Bulldogs men's basketball team
