= 2018–19 Missouri Tigers women's basketball team =

Intercollegiate basketball season

2018–19 Missouri Tigers women's basketball

NCAA tournament, second round
- Conference: Southeastern Conference
- Record: 24–11 (10–6 SEC)
- Head coach: Robin Pingeton (9th season)
- Assistant coaches: Jenny Putnam; Ashleen Bracey; Chris Bracey
- Home arena: Mizzou Arena

2018–19 SEC women's basketball standings
	Conf.				Overall
Team	W		L	PCT	W		L	PCT
No. 4 Mississippi State †	15	–	1	.938	33	–	3	.917
No. 15 South Carolina	13	–	3	.813	23	–	9	.719
No. 14 Texas A&M	12	–	4	.750	26	–	7	.788
No. 17 Kentucky	11	–	5	.688	25	–	8	.758
Missouri	10	–	6	.625	24	–	11	.686
Auburn	9	–	7	.563	22	–	10	.688
Georgia	9	–	7	.563	18	–	12	.600
Tennessee	7	–	9	.438	19	–	13	.594
LSU	7	–	9	.438	16	–	13	.552
Arkansas	6	–	10	.375	22	–	15	.595
Alabama	5	–	11	.313	14	–	17	.452
Ole Miss	3	–	13	.188	9	–	22	.290
Florida	3	–	13	.188	8	–	23	.258
Vanderbilt	2	–	14	.125	7	–	23	.233
† 2019 SEC tournament winner Rankings from AP poll

The 2018–19 Missouri Tigers women's basketball team represented the University of Missouri in the 2018–19 NCAA Division I women's basketball season. The Tigers were led by ninth-year head coach Robin Pingeton. They played their games at Mizzou Arena and were members of the Southeastern Conference. They finished the season 24–11, 11–5 in SEC play to finish in fifth place. They advanced to the semifinals of the SEC women's tournament, where they lost to Mississippi State. They received an at-large bid to the NCAA women's tournament, where they defeated Drake in the first round before losing to Iowa in the second round.

== Previous season ==
The Tigers began the 2017–18 season ranked #16 in both the AP and Coaches Polls. They finished the season 24–8, 11–5 in SEC play to finish in a four-way tie for fourth place. Ranked 14th nationally, they advanced to the quarterfinals of the SEC women's tournament, where they lost to 19th-ranked Georgia. They received an at-large bid to the NCAA women's tournament, where they were upset by Florida Gulf Coast in the first round.

== Roster ==
2018–19 Missouri Tigers women's basketball team
Players
Coaches

Pos.	#	Name	Height	Year	Previous school	Hometown
G	1	Kelsey Winfrey	5 ft 9 in (1.75 m)	So	Lebanon	Lebanon, MO
G	2	Akira Levy	5 ft 8 in (1.73 m)	Fr	Upperman	Baxter, TN
G	3	Sophie Cunningham	6 ft 1 in (1.85 m)	Sr	Rock Bridge	Columbia, MO
G	5	Lauren Aldridge	5 ft 7 in (1.7 m)	RS Sr	Marshfield; Kansas	Marshfield, MO
G	10	Nadia Green	5 ft 7 in (1.7 m)	So	Homewood-Flossmoor	Chicago, IL
G	11	Haley Troup	5 ft 10 in (1.78 m)	RS Fr	Gadsden City	Gadsden, AL
G	12	Elle Brown	5 ft 11 in (1.8 m)	So	Rock Bridge	Columbia, MO
F	13	Hannah Schuchts	6 ft 2 in (1.88 m)	RS Jr	Maclay School	Tallahassee, FL
F	21	Cierra Porter	6 ft 4 in (1.93 m)	Sr	Rock Bridge	Columbia, MO
G	22	Jordan Roundtree	5 ft 9 in (1.75 m)	Jr	Kirkwood	St. Louis, MO
G	23	Amber Smith	5 ft 11 in (1.8 m)	So	Loyola College Prep	Shreveport, LA
G	24	Jordan Chavis	5 ft 7 in (1.7 m)	Jr	Central Davidson	Lexington, NC
F	34	Emmanuelle Tahane	6 ft 1 in (1.85 m)	So	Marcellin Berthelot	Bondy, France
F	43	Grace Berg	6 ft 0 in (1.83 m)	Fr	Indianola	Indianaola, IA
F	45	Brittany Garner	6 ft 1 in (1.85 m)	Fr	Winslow Township	Philadelphia, PA

Head coach

- Robin Pingeton (St. Ambrose)

Assistant coach(es)

- Jenny Putnam (St. Ambrose)
- Ashleen Bracey (Illinois State)
- Chris Bracey (West Texas A&M)

Legend

- (C) Team captain
- (S) Suspended
- (I) Ineligible
- (W) Walk-on
- Injured
- Current redshirt

Roster
Last update: September 7, 2018

== Schedule ==
Date time, TV	Rank^{#}	Opponent^{#}	Result	Record	Site (attendance) city, state
Exhibition
10/29/2018*; 7:00 pm	No. 16	Missouri Western	W 70–48		Mizzou Arena (1,583); Columbia, MO
11/01/2018*; 7:00 pm	No. 16	Washburn	W 74–59		Mizzou Arena; Columbia, MO
Non-conference regular season
11/06/2018*; 8:00 pm	No. 16	at Western Illinois	W 89–64	1–0	Western Hall (1,227); Macomb, IL
11/14/2018*; 7:00 pm	No. 16	Missouri State	W 65–61	2–0	Mizzou Arena (4,111); Columbia, MO
11/16/2018*; 6:00 pm, SECN	No. 16	Green Bay	L 49–56	2–1	Mizzou Arena (3,687); Columbia, MO
11/19/2018*; 7:00 pm	No. 21	SIU Edwardsville	W 59–36	3–1	Mizzou Arena (3,254); Columbia, MO
11/23/2018*; 6:30 pm	No. 21	vs. Michigan; Gulf Coast Showcase Quarterfinals	L 54–70	3–2	Hertz Arena (1,317); Estero, FL
11/24/2018*; 12:30 pm	No. 21	vs. Quinnipiac; Gulf Coast Showcase Consolation 2nd round	W 65–51	4–2	Hertz Arena (716); Estero, FL
11/25/2018*; 12:30 pm	No. 21	vs. Duke; Gulf Coast Showcase 5th place game	W 72–64	5–2	Hertz Arena (762); Estero, FL
12/02/2018*; 4:00 pm		at West Virginia; Big 12/SEC Women's Challenge	W 68–51	6–2	WVU Coliseum (1,273); Morgantown, WV
12/06/2018*; 7:00 pm	No. 23	UMKC	W 66–59	7–2	Mizzou Arena (3,407); Columbia, MO
12/09/2018*; 5:00 pm	No. 23	at Saint Louis	W 74–62	8–2	Chaifetz Arena (3,784); St. Louis, MO
12/15/2018*; 3:00 pm	No. 22	South Dakota	L 61–74	8–3	Mizzou Arena (4,509); Columbia, MO
12/17/2018*; 7:00 pm		Texas State	W 69–50	9–3	Mizzou Arena (3,518); Columbia, MO
12/21/2018*; 12:00 pm		at Illinois	W 67–45	10–3	State Farm Center (1,288); Champaign, IL
12/30/2018*; 2:00 pm		Arkansas State	W 70–50	11–3	Mizzou Arena (5,265); Columbia, MO
SEC regular season
01/03/2019; 7:00 pm		Ole Miss	W 78–55	12–3 (1–0)	Mizzou Arena (4,083); Columbia, MO
01/06/2019; 1:00 pm, ESPN2		at No. 10 Tennessee	W 66–64	13–3 (2–0)	Thompson–Boling Arena (9,113); Knoxville, TN
01/10/2019; 7:00 pm		Arkansas	W 71–53	14–3 (3–0)	Mizzou Arena (4,216); Columbia, MO
01/13/2019; 2:00 pm, SECN		at Florida	L 56–58	14–4 (3–1)	O'Connell Center (2,218); Gainesville, FL
01/17/2019; 6:00 pm, SECN		Georgia	W 61–35	15–4 (4–1)	Mizzou Arena (4,004); Columbia, MO
01/21/2019; 6:00 pm, ESPN2	No. 25	at No. 19 South Carolina	L 65–79	15–5 (4–2)	Colonial Life Arena (12,004); Columbia, SC
01/24/2019; 5:30 pm, SECN	No. 25	at No. 15 Kentucky	L 41–52	15–6 (4–3)	Memorial Coliseum (4,174); Lexington, KY
01/27/2019; 2:00 pm	No. 25	Auburn	W 74–65	16–6 (5–3)	Mizzou Arena (5,119); Columbia, MO
02/04/2019; 6:00 pm, SECN		at LSU	L 51–61	16–7 (5–4)	Pete Maravich Assembly Center (1,756); Baton Rouge, LA
02/07/2019; 6:00 pm, SECN		No. 18 Texas A&M	W 70–65 ^{OT}	17–7 (6–4)	Mizzou Arena (4,513); Columbia, MO
02/10/2019; 3:00 pm, SECN		Vanderbilt	W 69–46	18–7 (7–4)	Mizzou Arena (4,857); Columbia, MO
02/14/2019; 8:00 pm, SECN		at No. 5 Mississippi State	W 75–67	19–7 (8–4)	Humphrey Coliseum (7,545); Starkville, MS
02/17/2019; 4:00 pm, ESPN2		Tennessee	L 60–62	19–8 (8–5)	Mizzou Arena (8,559); Columbia, MO
02/24/2019; 2:00 pm		at Auburn	L 54–58	19–9 (8–6)	Auburn Arena (2,293); Auburn, AL
02/28/2019; 8:00 pm, SECN		at Arkansas	W 73–67	20–9 (9–6)	Bud Walton Arena (1,153); Fayetteville, AR
03/03/2019; 2:00 pm		Alabama	W 82–47	21–9 (10–6)	Mizzou Arena (6,527); Columbia, MO
SEC Women's Tournament
03/07/2019; 1:30 pm, SECN	(5)	vs. (13) Florida; Second Round	W 87–56	22–9	Bon Secours Wellness Arena; Greenville, SC
03/08/2019; 1:30 pm, SECN	(5)	vs. (4) No. 13 Kentucky; Quarterfinals	W 70–68 ^{OT}	23–9	Bon Secours Wellness Arena (4,431); Greenville, SC
03/09/2019; 4:00 pm, ESPNU	(5)	vs. (1) No. 5 Mississippi State; Semifinals	L 56–71	23–10	Bon Secours Wellness Arena; Greenville, SC
NCAA Women's Tournament
03/22/2019*; 3:00 pm, ESPN2	(7 G)	vs. (10 G) Drake; First Round	W 77–76 ^{OT}	24–10	Carver–Hawkeye Arena (10,720); Iowa City, IA
03/24/2019*; 1:00 pm, ESPN2	(7 G)	at (2 G) No. 8 Iowa; Second Round	L 52–68	24–11	Carver–Hawkeye Arena (12,376); Iowa City, IA
*Non-conference game. ^{#}Rankings from AP Poll. (#) Tournament seedings in parentheses. G=Greensboro Region. All times are in Central Time.

== Rankings ==
Regular season polls
Poll	Pre- season	Week 2	Week 3	Week 4	Week 5	Week 6	Week 7	Week 8	Week 9	Week 10	Week 11	Week 12	Week 13	Week 14	Week 15	Week 16	Week 17	Week 18	Week 19	Final
AP	16	16	21	RV	23	22	RV			RV	RV	25	RV	RV	RV	RV	RV	RV	RV	N/A
Coaches	14	14^	18	RV	25	24	RV	RV	RV	RV	RV	RV	RV	RV	RV	25	RV	RV	RV	RV

Legend
	Increase in ranking
	Decrease in ranking
	Not ranked previous week
(RV)	Received votes

^Coaches did not release a Week 2 poll.
