= 2021–22 Wyoming Cowgirls basketball team =

Intercollegiate basketball season

2021–22 Wyoming Cowgirls basketball

WNIT, Third Round
- Conference: Mountain West Conference
- Record: 17–13 (11–6 Mountain West)
- Head coach: Gerald Mattinson (3rd season)
- Assistant coaches: Heather Ezell; Fallon Lewis; Ryan Larsen
- Home arena: Arena-Auditorium

2021–22 Mountain West Conference women's basketball standings
	Conf.				Overall
Team	W		L	PCT	W		L	PCT
UNLV †	15	–	3	.833	26	–	7	.788
New Mexico	14	–	4	.778	26	–	10	.722
Wyoming	11	–	6	.647	17	–	13	.567
Nevada	11	–	6	.647	20	–	13	.606
Air Force	11	–	7	.611	19	–	14	.576
Colorado State	9	–	9	.500	21	–	12	.636
San Diego State	8	–	10	.444	15	–	16	.484
Fresno State	7	–	10	.412	11	–	18	.379
Utah State	5	–	13	.278	11	–	19	.367
Boise State	4	–	13	.235	8	–	21	.276
San Jose State	2	–	16	.111	5	–	25	.167
† 2022 MW Tournament winner

The 2021–22 Wyoming Cowgirls basketball team represented the University of Wyoming in the 2021–22 college basketball season. The Cowgirls were led by head coach Gerald Mattinson, in his third season. The Cowgirls played their home games at the Arena-Auditorium and are members of the Mountain West Conference. The Cowgirls finished tied for 3rd in the Mountain West Conference, but exited the Mountain West Conference Women's Basketball tournament in the quarterfinal round, losing to Colorado State 51-38 due to an embarrassing 4th quarter performance.

== Previous season ==
The Cowgirls finished the 2020–21 season 14–10, 8–8 in Mountain West play to finish in seventh place in the conference. They defeated Utah State, UNLV, Boise State, and Fresno State to win the 2021 Mountain West Conference women's basketball tournament, the first in program history. The Cowgirls lost to UCLA in the Round of 64 of the NCAA tournament.

== Offseason ==
=== Departures ===
Name	Number	Pos.	Height	Year	Hometown	Reason for departure
Jaye Johnson	5	F	5'10"	Sr.	Casper, WY	Graduated
Dagný Lísa Davíðsdóttir	33	F	6'1"	Sr.	Hveragerði, ISL	Graduated

=== Arrivals ===
Name	Number	Pos.	Height	Year	Hometown	Previous School
Emily Mellema	2	G	5'11"	Fr.	Lynden, WA	Lynden Christian HS
Tess Barnes	5	F	6'2"	Fr.	Gisborne, AUS	Maribyrnong College
Allyson Fertig	45	C	6'4"	Fr.	Glendo, WY	Douglas HS

Wyoming was selected to finish fifth in the Mountain West preseason poll, and no Cowgirls were selected to the preseason all-conference team.

== Roster ==
2021–22 Wyoming Cowgirls women's basketball team
Players
Coaches

Pos.	#	Name	Height	Year	Previous school	Hometown
G	2	Emily Mellema	5 ft 11 in (1.8 m)	Fr	Lynden Christian HS	Lynden, WA
F	4	Grace Ellis	6 ft 0 in (1.83 m)	So	St Peters Lutheran College	Brisbane, AUS
G/F	5	Tess Barnes	6 ft 2 in (1.88 m)	Fr	Maribyrnong College	Gisborne, AUS
F	10	Paula Salazar	6 ft 3 in (1.91 m)	So	Institute Vilanova del Valles	Barcelona, ESP
G	11	Alba Sanchez Ramos	6 ft 0 in (1.83 m)	Sr	Colegio Torreyilano	Madrid, ESP
G	12	McKinley Bradshaw	5 ft 11 in (1.8 m)	Jr	Lyman HS	Lyman, WY
G	14	Quinn Weidemann	5 ft 9 in (1.75 m)	Sr	Westside HS	Omaha, NE
F	15	Marta Savic	6 ft 1 in (1.85 m)	So	Sport Gymnasium	Zagreb, CRO
G	21	Landri Hudson	5 ft 9 in (1.75 m)	So	Grandview HS	Aurora, CO
G/F	23	Lexi Bull	6 ft 0 in (1.83 m)	So	Century HS	Pocatello, ID
G	24	Tommi Olson	5 ft 6 in (1.68 m)	Sr	Highlands Ranch HS	Worland, WY
G	30	Ola Ustowska	5 ft 10 in (1.78 m)	So	SMS PZKosz Lomianki	Kartuzy, POL
C	45	Allyson Fertig	6 ft 4 in (1.93 m)	Fr	Douglas HS	Glendo, WY

Head coach

- Gerald Mattinson (Weber State)

Assistant coach(es)

- Heather Ezell (Iowa State)
- Ryan Larsen (MSU Moorhead)
- Fallon Lewis (Wyoming)

Legend

- (C) Team captain
- (S) Suspended
- (I) Ineligible
- (W) Walk-on
- Injured
- Current redshirt

Roster
Last update: November 8, 2021

== Statistics ==
Player	GP	GS	MPG	FG%	3FG%	FT%	RPG	APG	SPG	BPG	PPG
Tess Barnes	19	0	8.7	.186	.200	1.000	1.9	.8	.2	.3	1.3
McKinley Bradshaw	29	29	32.3	.390	.340	.763	5.7	1.4	.8	.2	14.9
Lexi Bull	10	0	3.3	.091	.000	.500	1.4	.3	.0	.2	.3
Grace Ellis	30	8	18.9	.381	.174	.859	3.5	.7	.3	.1	5.6
Allyson Fertig	30	23	21.0	.504	.000	.618	8.4	.2	.3	.9	10.8
Landri Hudson	9	0	2.6	.400	.000	1.000	.6	.2	.3	.0	.6
Emily Mellema	30	0	14.7	.350	.244	.730	1.2	1.2	.4	.1	3.6
Tommi Olson	30	30	32.7	.316	.308	.769	4.5	3.3	1.5	.0	4.3
Paula Salazar	25	0	9.6	.456	.200	.714	2.0	.2	.1	.4	3.8
Alba Sanchez Ramos	29	29	29.8	.369	.329	.769	6.4	2.8	.7	.3	7.9
Marta Savic	8	0	4.4	.500	.000	.000	1.6	.1	.1	.1	1.8
Ola Ustowska	13	1	17.2	.450	.432	.643	.8	1.0	.3	.0	6.1
Quinn Weidemann	30	30	34.7	.420	.419	.879	3.0	2.6	.8	.2	11.0

== Schedule ==
Date time, TV	Rank^{#}	Opponent^{#}	Result	Record	Site (attendance) city, state
Exhibition
November 5*; 6:30 pm		UC Colorado Springs	W 66–39	0–0	Arena-Auditorium (2,477); Laramie, WY
Non–Conference
November 9*; 11:00 am		CSU Pueblo	W 67–53	1–0	Arena-Auditorium (4,402); Laramie, WY
November 13*; 2:00 pm		Wichita State	L 48–57	1–1	Arena-Auditorium (2,521); Laramie, WY
November 18*; 5:00 pm		at Kansas City	L 44–53	1–2	Municipal Auditorium (439); Kansas City, MO
November 22*; 6:30 pm		Chadron State	W 71–48	2–2	Arena-Auditorium (1,843); Laramie, WY
November 26*; 1:00 pm		vs. Tulane; Denver Thanksgiving Classic	L 67–73	2–3	Hamilton Gymnasium (84); Denver, CO
November 27*; 3:30 pm		at Denver; Denver Thanksgiving Classic	W 81–51	3–3	Hamilton Gymnasium (379); Denver, CO
December 3*; 7:00 pm		at Gonzaga	L 47–54	3–4	McCarthey Athletic Center (3,171); Spokane, WA
December 12*; 1:00 pm		North Dakota State	W 71–45	4–4	Arena-Auditorium (2,085); Laramie, WY
December 22*; 11:00 am		at Nebraska	L 61–72	4–5	Pinnacle Bank Arena (4,566); Lincoln, NE
Mountain West Conference
December 28; 2:00 pm		at San Diego State	W 62–54	5–5 (1–0)	Viejas Arena (360); San Diego, CA
December 31; 3:00 pm		at UNLV	L 60–66	5–6 (1–1)	Cox Pavilion (408); Paradise, NV
January 9; 1:00 pm		Fresno State	Cancelled due to COVID-19 protocols		Arena-Auditorium; Laramie, WY
January 13; 6:30 pm		New Mexico	L 76–85	5–7 (1–2)	Arena-Auditorium (2,551); Laramie, WY
January 15; 2:00 pm		Air Force	W 57–54	6–7 (2–2)	Arena-Auditorium (1,981); Laramie, WY
January 19; 6:30 pm		at Boise State	L 59–70	6–8 (2–3)	ExtraMile Arena (542); Boise, ID
January 22; 2:00 pm		at Utah State	L 66–76	6–9 (2–4)	Smith Spectrum (432); Logan, UT
January 26; 6:30 p.m.		Boise State; Rescheduled from January 3	W 61–47	7–9 (3–4)	Arena-Auditorium (2,009); Laramie, WY
January 29; 2:00 p.m.		Nevada	W 62–53	8–9 (4–4)	Arena-Auditorium (2,195); Laramie, WY
February 2; 6:30 p.m.		at Air Force	L 45–47	8–10 (4–5)	Clune Arena (204); Colorado Springs, CO
February 5; 2:00 p.m.		at New Mexico	W 60–59	9–10 (5–5)	The Pit (5,075); Albuquerque, NM
February 9; 6:30 p.m.		San Jose State	W 75–54	10–10 (6–5)	Arena-Auditorium (1,520); Laramie, WY
February 12; 3:00 p.m.		at Fresno State	W 61–58	11–10 (7–5)	Save Mart Center (1,027); Fresno, CA
February 14; 7:00 p.m.		at San Jose State; Rescheduled from January 6	W 84–64	12–10 (8–5)	Provident Credit Union Event Center (255); San Jose, CA
February 17; 6:00 p.m.		at Colorado State; Border War	L 45–56	12–11 (8–6)	Moby Arena (1,433); Fort Collins, CO
February 24; 6:30 p.m.		UNLV	W 77–73	13–11 (9–6)	Arena-Auditorium (2,416); Laramie, WY
February 26; 2:00 p.m.		San Diego State	W 70–46	14–11 (10–6)	Arena-Auditorium (2,919); Laramie, WY
March 2; 6:30 p.m.		Colorado State; Border War	W 69–63 ^{OT}	15–11 (11–6)	Arena-Auditorium (2,375); Laramie, WY
Mountain West Women's Tournament
March 7; 9:30 p.m.	(3)	vs. (6) Colorado State; Quarterfinals	L 38–51	15–12	Thomas & Mack Center; Paradise, NV
WNIT
March 17; 6:30 p.m.		Idaho State; First Round	W 76–73 ^{OT}	16–12	Arena-Auditorium (1,647); Laramie, WY
March 20; 2:30 p.m.		Tulsa; Second Round	W 97–90 ^{3OT}	17–12	Arena-Auditorium (2,412); Laramie, WY
March 24; 6:30 p.m.		UCLA; Third Round	L 81–82 ^{3OT}	17–13	Arena-Auditorium (4,297); Laramie, WY
*Non-conference game. ^{#}Rankings from AP Poll. (#) Tournament seedings in parentheses. All times are in Mountain Time. All dates, times, and TV are tentative and subject to change.
