= 2020–21 Wyoming Cowgirls basketball team =

Intercollegiate basketball season

2020–21 Wyoming Cowgirls basketball

Mountain West tournament champions

NCAA Tournament, Round of 64
- Conference: Mountain West Conference
- Record: 14–10 (8–8 Mountain West)
- Head coach: Gerald Mattinson (2nd season)
- Assistant coaches: Heather Ezell; Fallon Lewis; Ryan Larsen
- Home arena: Arena-Auditorium

2020–21 Mountain West Conference women's basketball standings
	Conf.				Overall
Team	W		L	PCT	W		L	PCT
New Mexico	11	–	3	.786	15	–	5	.750
UNLV	13	–	5	.722	15	–	9	.625
Colorado State	11	–	5	.688	15	–	6	.714
Fresno State	12	–	6	.667	17	–	11	.607
Nevada	9	–	7	.563	13	–	9	.591
Boise State	10	–	8	.556	14	–	9	.609
Wyoming†	8	–	8	.500	14	–	10	.583
San Jose State	1	–	2	.333	2	–	3	.400
San Diego State	5	–	12	.294	7	–	17	.292
Air Force	4	–	14	.222	8	–	18	.308
Utah State	2	–	16	.111	4	–	20	.167
† 2021 MW Tournament winner San Jose State suspended their season on January 14, 2021; As of July 7, 2024; Rankings from AP poll

The 2020–21 Wyoming Cowgirls basketball team represented the University of Wyoming in the 2020–21 college basketball season. The Cowgirls were led by head coach Gerald Mattinson, in his second season. The Cowgirls played their home games at the Arena-Auditorium and are members of the Mountain West Conference. The beginning of the season was delayed until at least November 25, as a result of the COVID-19 pandemic.

== Previous season ==
The Cowgirls finished the 2019–20 season 17–12, 12–6 in Mountain West play to finish in third place. They defeated Utah State in the Mountain West tournament before losing to Boise State in the semifinals. They didn't play in a postseason tournament.

== Offseason ==
=== Departures ===
Name	Number	Pos.	Height	Year	Hometown	Reason for departure
Karla Erjavec	1	G	5'10"	Junior	Zagreb, CRO	Transferred to Miami
Tereza Vitulova	2	F	6'2"	Junior	Domašov, CZE	Transferred to South Florida
Elisa Pilli	3	G	5'9"	Graduate	Padua, ITA	Graduated
Taylor Rusk	4	F	5'11"	Graduate	Highlands Ranch, CO	Graduated
Selale Kepenc	10	F	6'1"	Senior	Istanbul, TUR	Graduated
Jaeden Vaifaunua	23	F	6'1"	Sophomore	Draper, UT	Religious mission

=== Arrivals ===
Name	Number	Pos.	Height	Year	Hometown	Previous School
Iris Tsafra	0	G	6'0"	RS Sophomore	Athens, GRE	South Florida
Grace Ellis	4	F	6'0"	Freshman	Brisbane, AUS	St Peters Lutheran College
Paula Salazar	10	F	6'3"	Freshman	Barcelona ESP	Institute Vilanova del Valles
Marta Savic	15	F	6'1"	Freshman	Zagreb, CRO	Sport Gymnasium
Landri Hudson	21	G	5'9"	Freshman	Aurora, CO	Grandview HS
Lexi Bull	23	G/F	6'0"	Freshman	Pocatello, ID	Century HS
Ola Ustowska	30	G	5'10"	Freshman	Kartuzy, POL	SMS PZKosz Lomianki
Dagný Lísa Davíðsdóttir	33	F	6'1"	Senior	Hveragerði, ISL	Niagara

== Roster ==
2020–21 Wyoming Cowgirls women's basketball team
Players
Coaches

Pos.	#	Name	Height	Year	Previous school	Hometown
G	0	Iris Tsafara	6 ft 0 in (1.83 m)	RS So	South Florida; First High School of Agia Paraskeui	Athens, GRE
F	4	Grace Ellis	6 ft 0 in (1.83 m)	Fr	St Peters Lutheran College	Brisbane, AUS
F	5	Jaye Johnson	5 ft 10 in (1.78 m)	Sr	Casper College; Natrona County HS	Casper, WY
F	10	Paula Salazar	6 ft 3 in (1.91 m)	Fr	Institute Vilanova del Valles	Barcelona, ESP
G	11	Alba Sanchez Ramos	6 ft 0 in (1.83 m)	Jr	Colegio Torreyilano	Madrid, ESP
G	12	McKinley Bradshaw	5 ft 11 in (1.8 m)	So	Lyman HS	Lyman, WY
G	14	Quinn Weidemann	5 ft 9 in (1.75 m)	Jr	Westside HS	Omaha, NE
F	15	Marta Savic	6 ft 1 in (1.85 m)	Fr	Sport Gymnasium	Zagreb, CRO
G	21	Landri Hudson	5 ft 9 in (1.75 m)	Fr	Grandview HS	Aurora, CO
F	22	Paige Toomer	6 ft 0 in (1.83 m)	So	Cody HS	Cody, WY
G/F	23	Lexi Bull	6 ft 0 in (1.83 m)	Fr	Century HS	Pocatello, ID
G	24	Tommi Olson	5 ft 6 in (1.68 m)	Jr	Highlands Ranch HS	Worland, WY
G	30	Ola Ustowska	5 ft 10 in (1.78 m)	Fr	SMS PZKosz Lomianki	Kartuzy, POL
G	32	Emily Buchanan	5 ft 6 in (1.68 m)	Sr	Eastern Wyoming College; Southeast HS	Yoder, WY
F	33	Dagný Lísa Davíðsdóttir	6 ft 1 in (1.85 m)	Sr	Niagara; Westtown School	Hveragerði, ISL

Head coach

- Gerald Mattinson (Weber State)

Assistant coach(es)

- Heather Ezell (Iowa State)
- Ryan Larsen (MSU Moorhead)
- Fallon Lewis (Wyoming)

Legend

- (C) Team captain
- (S) Suspended
- (I) Ineligible
- (W) Walk-on
- Injured
- Current redshirt

Roster
Last update: October 20, 2020

== Statistics ==
Player	GP	GS	MPG	FG%	3FG%	FT%	RPG	APG	SPG	BPG	PPG
McKinley Bradshaw	22	4	22.8	.462	.427	.768	3.8	1.0	.5	.0	11.7
Lexi Bull	9	0	2.2	.500	.500	—	.3	.2	.1	.0	.3
Dagný Lísa Davíðsdóttir	24	24	24.3	.505	.000	.674	5.4	.6	.4	.7	9.0
Grace Ellis	24	0	10.3	.296	.292	.739	1.5	.5	.0	.1	2.3
Landri Hudson	10	0	2.5	.200	.250	—	.1	.1	.1	.0	.3
Jaye Johnson	24	20	21.3	.327	.282	.750	2.5	1.0	.3	.3	4.3
Tommi Olson	24	24	33.6	.393	.280	.500	5.4	4.2	2.3	.2	5.8
Paula Salazar	14	0	5.5	.212	.083	.250	.9	.2	.1	.4	1.1
Alba Sanchez Ramos	24	24	31.1	.400	.299	.714	6.3	1.9	.6	.4	10.3
Marta Savic	21	0	7.2	.614	—	.500	1.9	.2	.2	.1	3.8
Ola Ustowska	24	0	14.4	.348	.317	.429	1.2	.6	.2	.1	3.5
Quinn Weidemann	24	24	34.9	.364	.398	.897	2.3	2.9	.9	.3	11.0

== Schedule ==
Date time, TV	Rank^{#}	Opponent^{#}	Result	Record	Site (attendance) city, state
Non–Conference
December 5*; 2:00 pm		Denver	W 79–67	1–0	Arena-Auditorium (1,045); Laramie, WY
December 8* TBA		No. 25 Gonzaga	L 50–89	1–1	Arena-Auditorium (1,003); Laramie, WY
December 20*; TBA		at Northern Colorado	W 53–50 ^{OT}	3–2	Bank of Colorado Arena; Greeley, CO
February 24*; 6:30 pm		CSU–Pueblo	Cancelled		Arena-Auditorium; Laramie, WY
Mountain West Conference
December 12; 2:30 pm		at UNLV	L 46–54	1–2 (0–1)	Cox Pavilion; Paradise, NV
December 14; 2:30 pm		at UNLV	W 67–62	2–2 (1–1)	Cox Pavilion; Paradise, NV
January 2; 2:00 pm		Fresno State	W 65–63	4–2 (2–1)	Arena-Auditorium; Laramie, WY
January 4; 6:30 pm		Fresno State	L 80–83 ^{OT}	4–3 (2–2)	Arena-Auditorium; Laramie, WY
January 11; 2:00 pm		at Boise State	L 61–68	4–4 (2–3)	ExtraMile Arena; Boise, ID
January 13; TBA		at Boise State	L 62–68	4–5 (2–4)	ExtraMile Arena; Boise, ID
January 16; TBA		Air Force	W 55–49	5–5 (3–4)	Arena-Auditorium; Laramie, WY
January 18; 6:30 pm		Air Force	W 59–46	6–5 (4–4)	Arena-Auditorium; Laramie, WY
January 22; 6:00 pm		at Nevada	L 52–60	6–6 (4–5)	Lawlor Events Center; Reno, NV
January 24; 1:30 pm		at Nevada	L 50–57	6–7 (4–6)	Lawlor Events Center (50); Reno, NV
January 28; 6:30 pm		San Diego State	W 54–36	7–7 (5–6)	Arena-Auditorium (695); Laramie, WY
January 30; 1:00 pm		San Diego State	W 62–41	8–7 (6–6)	Arena-Auditorium (780); Laramie, WY
February 4; 6:00 pm		at Colorado State	L 61–69	8–8 (6–7)	Moby Arena; Fort Collins, CO
February 6; 1:00 pm		at Colorado State	L 65–68	8–9 (6–8)	Moby Arena; Fort Collins, CO
February 11; 6:30 pm		Utah State	W 68–56	9–9 (7–8)	Arena-Auditorium (844); Laramie, WY
February 13; 2:00 pm		Utah State	W 79–42	10–9 (8–8)	Arena-Auditorium; Laramie, WY
February 17		New Mexico	Canceled		Arena-Auditorium; Laramie, WY
February 19		New Mexico	Canceled		Arena-Auditorium; Laramie, WY
February 25		at San Jose State	Canceled		Provident Credit Union Event Center; San Jose, CA
February 27		at San Jose State	Canceled		Provident Credit Union Event Center; San Jose, CA
Mountain West Women's Tournament
March 7; 5:30 pm	(7)	vs. (10) Utah State; First Round	W 69–41	11–9	Thomas & Mack Center; Paradise, NV
March 8; 6:30 pm	(7)	vs. (2) UNLV; Quarterfinals	W 72–56	12–9	Thomas & Mack Center; Paradise, NV
March 8; 8:30 pm	(7)	vs. (6) Boise State; Semifinals	W 53–38	13–9	Thomas & Mack Center; Paradise, NV
March 9; 9:00 pm, CBSSN	(7)	vs. (4) Fresno State; Championship	W 59–56	14–9	Thomas & Mack Center; Paradise, NV
NCAA tournament
March 22*; 8:00 pm, ESPN	(14 H)	vs. (3 H) No. 9 UCLA; Round of 64	L 48–69	14–10	Alamodome; San Antonio, TX
*Non-conference game. ^{#}Rankings from AP Poll. (#) Tournament seedings in parentheses. All times are in Mountain Time. All dates, times, and TV are tentative and subject to change.
