= 2009–10 Wyoming Cowgirls basketball team =

Intercollegiate basketball season

2009–10 Wyoming Cowgirls basketball
- Conference: Mountain West Conference
- Record: 6-0 (0-0 Mountain West)
- Head coach: Joe Legerski
- Home arena: Arena-Auditorium (Capacity: 15,028)

The 2009–10 Wyoming Cowgirls basketball team represented the University of Wyoming in the 2009–2010 NCAA Division I women's basketball season. The Cowgirls, coached by Joe Legerski, played their home games at the Arena-Auditorium in Laramie, Wyoming. The Cowgirls were a member of the Mountain West Conference.

== Offseason ==
- April 20, 2009: The University of Wyoming Cowgirl announced one addition to this year's recruiting class with the signing of Rebecca Campigli to attend the University of Wyoming beginning in the fall of 2009.

== Exhibition ==
Date	Opponent	Location	Time	Score	Record
11/02/09	vs. Adams State	Laramie, Wyo.	7:00 p.m. MT	72-36	1-0
11/06/09	vs. CSU-Pueblo	Laramie, Wyo.	7:00 p.m. MT	76-53	2-0

== Regular season ==
The Cowgirls will compete in the BlueCross BlueShield of Wyoming Shootout on December 12.

=== Roster ===
Number	Name	Height	Position	Class

=== Schedule ===
Date	Location	Opponent	Time	Score	Record
11/13/09	at Denver	Denver, Colo.	5:30 p.m. MT	65-62	1-0
11/15/09	vs. Montana	Laramie, Wyo.	2:00 p.m. MT	68-38	2-0
11/18/09	at North Dakota	Grand Forks, N.D.	6:00 p.m. MT	85-59	3-0
11/20/09	at North Dakota State	Fargo, N.D.	5:00 p.m. MT	68-60	4-0
11/24/09	vs. Black Hills State	Laramie, Wyo.	7:00 p.m. MT	68-45	5-0
11/30/09	vs. Idaho State	Laramie, Wyo.	7:00 p.m. MT	76-40	6-0
12/03/09	at Idaho	Moscow, Idaho	8:00 p.m. MT		
12/05/09	at Washington State	Pullman, Wash.	3:00 p.m. MT		
12/12/09	vs. Dakota State	Casper, Wyo.	1:00 p.m. MT		
12/18/09	vs. Weber State	Laramie, Wyo.	7:00 p.m. MT		
12/20/09	vs. Oregon	Laramie, Wyo.	2:00 p.m. MT		
12/31/09	at Boise State	Boise, Idaho	2:00 p.m. MT		
01/05/10	at Colorado State*	Fort Collins, Colo.	6:00 p.m. MT		
01/09/10	at San Diego State*	San Diego, Calif.	3:00 p.m. MT		
01/13/10	vs. TCU*	Laramie, Wyo.	7:00 p.m. MT		
01/16/10	at New Mexico*	Albuquerque, N.M.	2:00 p.m. MT		
01/19/10	vs. BYU*	Laramie, Wyo.	6:00 p.m. MT		
01/27/10	at Utah*	Salt Lake City, Utah	7:00 p.m. MT		
01/30/10	vs. Air Force*	Laramie, Wyo.	2:00 p.m. MT		
02/02/10	at UNLV*	Las Vegas, Nev.	9:00 p.m. MT		
02/06/10	vs. Colorado State*	Laramie, Wyo.	2:00 p.m. MT		
02/10/10	vs. San Diego State*	Laramie, Wyo.	7:00 p.m. MT		
02/13/10	at TCU*	Fort Worth, Texas	3:00 p.m. MT		
02/17/10	vs. New Mexico*	Laramie, Wyo.	7:00 p.m. MT		
02/20/10	at BYU*	Provo, Utah	2:00 p.m. MT		
02/28/10	vs. Utah*	Laramie, Wyo.	2:00 p.m. MT		
03/03/10	at Air Force*	Colorado Springs, Colo.	7:00 p.m. MT		
03/06/10	vs. UNLV*	Laramie, Wyo.	2:00 p.m. MT		

== Mountain West tournament ==
Date	Location	Opponent	Time	Score	Record
03/09/10	Las Vegas				

== See also ==
- 2009–10 Wyoming Cowboys basketball team
