= 2021–22 UNLV Lady Rebels basketball team =

Intercollegiate basketball season

2021–22 UNLV Lady Rebels basketball

Mountain West Regular season champion Mountain West tournament champion

NCAA tournament, first round
- Conference: Mountain West Conference
- Record: 26–7 (15–3 Mountain West)
- Head coach: Lindy La Rocque (2nd season)
- Assistant coaches: Roman Owen; Mia Bell; Karlie Burris
- Home arena: Cox Pavilion; Thomas & Mack Center

2021–22 Mountain West Conference women's basketball standings
	Conf.				Overall
Team	W		L	PCT	W		L	PCT
UNLV †	15	–	3	.833	26	–	7	.788
New Mexico	14	–	4	.778	26	–	10	.722
Wyoming	11	–	6	.647	17	–	13	.567
Nevada	11	–	6	.647	20	–	13	.606
Air Force	11	–	7	.611	19	–	14	.576
Colorado State	9	–	9	.500	21	–	12	.636
San Diego State	8	–	10	.444	15	–	16	.484
Fresno State	7	–	10	.412	11	–	18	.379
Utah State	5	–	13	.278	11	–	19	.367
Boise State	4	–	13	.235	8	–	21	.276
San Jose State	2	–	16	.111	5	–	25	.167
† 2022 MW Tournament winner

The 2021–22 UNLV Lady Rebels basketball team represented the University of Nevada, Las Vegas during the 2021–22 NCAA Division I women's basketball season. The Lady Rebels were led by second-year head coach Lindy La Rocque. They played their home games at the Cox Pavilion, attached to the Thomas & Mack Center on UNLV's main campus in Paradise, Nevada. They were a member of the Mountain West Conference. They finished the season 23–6, 15–3 in Mountain West play to win the Mountain West Conference regular season title. They went on to win the Mountain West women's tournament over Colorado State. They lost to Arizona as a 13-seed in the Greensboro region of the first round of the NCAA tournament.

== Roster ==
2021–22 UNLV Lady Rebels women's basketball team
Players
Coaches

Pos.	#	Name	Height	Year	Previous school	Hometown
G	0	Taylin Smith	5 ft 6 in (1.68 m)	Fr	Liberty HS	Beaverton, OR
F	1	Nneka Obiazor	5 ft 10 in (1.78 m)	So	Youngstown State	Eden Prairie, MN
G	2	Kenadee Winfrey	5 ft 11 in (1.8 m)	Fr	Canyon HS	Canyon, TX
G	3	Kiara Jackson	5 ft 7 in (1.7 m)	Fr	South Grand Prairie HS	Grand Prairie
G	5	Jade Thomas	5 ft 10 in (1.78 m)	So	Centennial HS	Las Vegas, NV
G	11	Justice Ethridge	5 ft 9 in (1.75 m)	Sr	Centennial HS	Las Vegas, NV
G	12	Alyssa Durazo-Frescas	5 ft 7 in (1.7 m)	Fr	Mater Dei HS	Newport Beach, CA
C	15	Keyana Wilfred	6 ft 3 in (1.91 m)	Jr	Mitchell HS	Mitchell, NE
F	20	Khayla Rooks	6 ft 1 in (1.85 m)	Sr	Washington	San Marcos, CA
C	23	Desi-Rae Young	6 ft 1 in (1.85 m)	So	Desert Oasis HS	Las Vegas, NV
G	24	Essence Booker	5 ft 8 in (1.73 m)	Jr	Ball State	Las Vegas, NV
F	44	Alyssa Brown	6 ft 1 in (1.85 m)	Fr	Sahuaro HS	Tucson, AZ

Head coach

- Lindy La Rocque (Stanford)

Assistant coach(es)

- Roman Owen (Southwestern Christian)
- Mia Bell (UNLV)
- Karlie Burris (Portland)

Legend

- (C) Team captain
- (S) Suspended
- (I) Ineligible
- (W) Walk-on
- Injured
- Current redshirt

Roster
Last update: March 19, 2022

== Schedule ==
Date time, TV	Rank^{#}	Opponent^{#}	Result	Record	Site (attendance) city, state
Exhibition
November 3*; 6:30 p.m.		Cal State Los Angeles	W 106–45		Cox Pavilion (393); Las Vegas, NV
Non-conference regular season
November 9*; 7:00 p.m.		at Oral Roberts	W 85–81	1–0	Mabee Center (389); Tulsa, OK
November 13*; 1:00 p.m.		Montana State	W 80–42	2–0	Thomas & Mack Center (423); Paradise, NV
November 17*; 6:00 p.m., ESPN+		at Northern Arizona	L 62–84	2–1	Walkup Skydome (325); Flagstaff, AZ
November 20*; 12:00 p.m.		Southern Utah	W 92–59	3–1	Cox Pavilion (588); Las Vegas, NV
November 27*; 12:00 p.m.		UT Arlington; UNLV Thanksgiving Classic	L 72–75	3–2	Cox Pavilion (499); Las Vegas, NV
November 28*; 12:00 p.m.		Grambling State; UNLV Thanksgiving Classic	W 89–49	4–2	Cox Pavilion (471); Las Vegas, NV
December 1*; 3:00 p.m., ESPN+		at Utah Valley	W 77–63	5–2	UCCU Center (894); Orem, UT
December 5*; 1:00 p.m., ESPN+		at CSU Bakersfield	W 71–56	6–2	Icardo Center (382); Bakersfield, CA
December 12*; 12:00 p.m., ESPN+		vs. Texas Tech	L 61–68	6–3	First United Bank Center (2,018); Canyon, TX
December 18*; 2:00 p.m.		Pacific	W 80–79	7–3	Cox Pavilion (558); Las Vegas, NV
December 21*; 2:00 p.m.		Hawaii	W 70–63	8–3	Cox Pavilion (649); Las Vegas, NV
Mountain West regular season
December 28; 6:00 p.m.		at Fresno State	W 73–63	9–3 (1–0)	Save Mart Center (1,545); Fresno, CA
December 31; 2:00 p.m.		Wyoming	W 66–60	10–3 (2–0)	Cox Pavilion (408); Las Vegas, NV
January 3; 6:00 p.m.		at New Mexico	L 68–71	10–4 (2–1)	The Pit (4,202); Albuquerque, NM
January 6; 6:00 p.m.		at Air Force	W 83–67	11–4 (3–1)	Clune Arena (176); Colorado Springs, CO
January 13; 6:30 p.m.		Boise State	W 73–51	12–4 (4–1)	Cox Pavilion (454); Las Vegas, NV
January 15; 4:00 p.m.		Utah State	W 86–68	13–4 (5–1)	Cox Pavilion (442); Las Vegas, NV
January 19; 6:00 p.m.		at San Jose State	W 74–54	14–4 (6–1)	Provident Credit Union Event Center (183); San Jose, CA
January 22; 2:00 p.m.		at Nevada	W 78–75	15–4 (7–1)	Lawlor Events Center (1,365); Reno, NV
January 27; 6:00 p.m.		New Mexico	W 85–79	16–4 (8–1)	Cox Pavilion (818); Las Vegas, NV
January 29; 2:00 p.m.		Air Force	W 72–54	17–4 (9–1)	Cox Pavilion (1,379); Las Vegas, NV
February 5; 7:00 p.m.		at Utah State	W 72–60	18–4 (10–1)	Smith Spectrum (347); Logan, UT
February 9; 5:30 p.m.		at Boise State	W 69–52	19–4 (11–1)	ExtraMile Arena (597); Boise, ID
February 12; 2:00 p.m.		San Diego State	W 76–67	20–4 (12–1)	Cox Pavilion (793); Las Vegas, NV
February 16; 6:30 p.m.		Fresno State	W 69–59	21–4 (13–1)	Cox Pavilion (541); Las Vegas, NV
February 19; 1:00 p.m.		San Jose State	W 104–63	22–4 (14–1)	Cox Pavilion; Las Vegas, NV
February 24; 5:30 p.m.		at Wyoming	L 73–77	22–5 (14–2)	Arena-Auditorium (2,416); Laramie, WY
February 26; 12:00 p.m.		at Colorado State	W 80–69	23–5 (15–2)	Moby Arena (2,454); Fort Collins, CO
March 2; 6:00 p.m.		Nevada	L 64–71	23–6 (15–3)	Cox Pavilion (1,401); Las Vegas, NV
Mountain West tournament
March 7; 12:00 p.m.	(1)	vs. (9) Utah State; Quarterfinal	W 82–69	24–6	Thomas & Mack Center; Paradise, NV
March 8; 5:00 p.m.	(1)	vs. (5) Air Force; Semifinal	W 61–50	25–6	Thomas & Mack Center; Paradise, NV
March 9; 7:00 p.m., CBSSN	(1)	vs. (6) Colorado State; Championship	W 75–65	26–6	Thomas & Mack Center; Paradise, NV
NCAA Women's Tournament
March 19*; 7:00 p.m., ESPN2	(13 G)	vs. (4 G) No. 19 Arizona; First round	L 67–72	26–7	McKale Center (9,573); Tucson, AZ
*Non-conference game. ^{#}Rankings from AP Poll. (#) Tournament seedings in parentheses. All times are in Pacific Time. All dates, times, and TV are tentative and subject to change.

== See also ==
2021–22 UNLV Runnin' Rebels basketball team
