= 2019–20 Boise State Broncos women's basketball team =

American college basketball season

2019–20 Boise State Broncos women's basketball

MWC tournament champions

NCAA tournament, Canceled
- Conference: Mountain West Conference
- Record: 24–9 (13–5 MWC)
- Head coach: Gordy Presnell (15th season)
- Assistant coaches: Cody Butler; Cariann Ramirez; Heather Sower
- Home arena: ExtraMile Arena

2019–20 Mountain West Conference women's basketball standings
	Conf.				Overall
Team	W		L	PCT	W		L	PCT
Fresno State	16	–	2	.889	24	–	6	.800
Boise State †	13	–	5	.722	22	–	9	.710
Wyoming	12	–	6	.667	16	–	11	.593
San Jose State	12	–	6	.667	19	–	11	.633
San Diego State	9	–	9	.500	14	–	17	.452
UNLV	9	–	9	.500	13	–	17	.433
Nevada	7	–	11	.389	15	–	16	.484
Air Force	7	–	11	.389	10	–	21	.323
New Mexico	6	–	12	.333	15	–	17	.469
Colorado State	6	–	12	.333	12	–	18	.400
Utah State	2	–	16	.111	8	–	22	.267
† 2020 MW Tournament winner Rankings from AP poll

The 2019–20 Boise State Broncos women's basketball team represented Boise State University during the 2019–20 NCAA Division I women's basketball season. The Broncos, led by fifteenth-year head coach Gordy Presnell, played their home games at ExtraMile Arena and competed as members of the Mountain West Conference (MWC).

== Previous season ==
The Broncos finished last season with a 28–5 record. They won the MWC regular season and tournament titles. They lost in the First Round of the NCAA tournament at Oregon State.

== Roster ==
2019–20 Boise State Broncos women's basketball team
Players
Coaches
'

Pos.	#	Name	Height	Year	Hometown
G	3	Maggie Freeman	5 ft 11 in (1.8 m)	RS Fr	Beaverton, OR
F	4	Kimora Sykes	6 ft 0 in (1.83 m)	Fr	Rancho Cucamonga, CA
F	5	Laia Soler	6 ft 1 in (1.85 m)	Fr	Mataró, Spain
F	10	Chinma Njoku	6 ft 2 in (1.88 m)	Fr	Pocatello, ID
G	14	Braydey Hodgins	5 ft 8 in (1.73 m)	Sr	Pasco, WA
G	21	Riley Lupfer	5 ft 9 in (1.75 m)	Sr	Spokane, WA
G	22	Ellie Woerner	6 ft 0 in (1.83 m)	RS Sr	Sammamish, WA
G	23	Jayde Christopher	5 ft 8 in (1.73 m)	RS Sr	Federal Way, WA
F	25	Rachel Bowers	6 ft 3 in (1.91 m)	So	Santa Clarita, CA
G	30	Jade Loville	5 ft 10 in (1.78 m)	So	Sammamish, WA
C	31	Marijke Vanderschaaf	6 ft 3 in (1.91 m)		Sammamish, WA
F	42	A'Shanti Coleman	6 ft 2 in (1.88 m)	RS Sr	San Francisco, CA
C	44	Mallory McGwire	6 ft 5 in (1.96 m)	RS Jr	Reno, NV

Head coach

- Gordy Presnell (Northwest Nazarene)

Assistant coach(es)

- Cody Butler (Nevada)
- Cariann Ramirez (Boise State)
- Heather Sower (Boise State)

Legend

- (C) Team captain
- (S) Suspended
- (I) Ineligible
- (W) Walk-on
- Injured
- Current redshirt

Roster

== Schedule ==
Date time, TV	Rank^{#}	Opponent^{#}	Result	Record	Site (attendance) city, state
Exhibition
November 5, 2019*; 7:00 pm		Concordia (OR)	W 79–39		ExtraMile Arena; Boise, ID
Regular season
November 5, 2019*; 5:30 pm		Lewis–Clark State	W 88–34	1–0	ExtraMile Arena (2,884); Boise, ID
November 8, 2019*; 7:00 pm		Portland State; Preseason WNIT	W 82–57	2–0	ExtraMile Arena (964); Boise, ID
November 10, 2019*; 2:00 pm		Missouri State; Preseason WNIT	L 69–72	2–1	ExtraMile Arena (910); Boise, ID
November 15, 2019*; 3:00 pm		at UAB; Preseason WNIT	W 83–81	3–1	Bartow Arena (265); Birmingham, AL
November 20, 2019*; 5:00 pm		Washington State	L 68–80	3–2	ExtraMile Arena (1,257); Boise, ID
November 24, 2019*; 11:00 am		at No. 8 Louisville	L 82–98	3–3	KFC Yum! Center (8,331); Louisville, KY
November 26, 2019*; 7:00 pm		Utah Valley	W 77–69	4–3	ExtraMile Arena (836); Boise, ID
December 1, 2019*; 4:00 pm		at TCU; Maggie Dixon Classic	L 65–77	4–4	Schollmaier Arena (1,500); Fort Worth, TX
December 4, 2019; 7:00 pm		New Mexico	W 83–82 ^{OT}	5–4 (1–0)	ExtraMile Arena (829); Boise, ID
December 8, 2019; 4:00 pm		at Colorado State	W 72–69	6–4 (2–0)	Moby Arena (1,005); Fort Collins, CO
December 11, 2019*; 7:00 pm		BYU	W 66–55	7–4	ExtraMile Arena (1,140); Boise, ID
December 15, 2019*; 2:05 pm		at Eastern Washington	W 63–61	8–4	Reese Court (426); Cheney, WA
December 18, 2019*; 12:00 pm		Western Oregon	W 75–32	9–4	ExtraMile Arena (663); Boise, ID
December 22, 2019*; 2:00 pm		Pepperdine	W 76–74	10–4	ExtraMile Arena (801); Boise, ID
January 1, 2020; 6:30 pm		at Wyoming	L 68–73	10–5 (2–1)	Arena-Auditorium (2,395); Laramie, WY
January 4, 2020; 2:00 pm		Nevada	W 54–40	11–5 (3–1)	ExtraMile Arena (2,212); Boise, ID
January 8, 2020; 1:00 pm		at UNLV	L 65–66	11–6 (3–2)	Cox Pavilion (1,633); Paradise, NV
January 11, 2020; 2:00 pm		San Diego State	W 86–72	12–6 (4–2)	ExtraMile Arena (1,394); Boise, ID
January 15, 2020; 7:00 pm		Air Force	W 70–61	13–6 (5–2)	ExtraMile Arena (795); Boise, ID
January 18, 2020; 2:00 pm		at Utah State	W 65–59	14–6 (6–2)	Smith Spectrum (388); Logan, UT
January 25, 2020; 1:00 pm		Fresno State	L 80–85	14–7 (6–3)	ExtraMile Arena (3,261); Boise, ID
January 29, 2020; 8:00 pm		at San Jose State	L 61–74	14–8 (6–4)	Provident Credit Union Event Center (1,362); San Jose, CA
February 1, 2020; 2:00 pm		at Nevada	W 83–72	15–8 (7–4)	Lawlor Events Center (1,617); Reno, NV
February 5, 2020; 7:00 pm		Wyoming	W 67–48	16–8 (8–4)	ExtraMile Arena (912); Boise, ID
February 8, 2020; 2:00 pm		Utah State	L 56–58	16–9 (8–5)	ExtraMile Arena (1,560); Boise, ID
February 12, 2020; 6:30 pm		at Air Force	W 74–69	17–9 (9–5)	Clune Arena (896); Colorado Springs, CO
February 15, 2020; 2:00 pm		at San Diego State	W 69–67 ^{OT}	18–9 (10–5)	Viejas Arena (880); San Diego, CA
February 19, 2020; 7:00 pm		San Jose State	W 85–67	19–9 (11–5)	ExtraMile Arena (1,120); Boise, ID
February 22, 2020; 2:00 pm		at New Mexico	W 95–76	20–9 (12–5)	The Pit (5,338); Albuquerque, NM
February 24, 2020; 7:00 pm		UNLV	W 81–52	21–9 (13–5)	ExtraMile Arena (1,505); Boise, ID
MWC Tournament
March 2, 2020; 7:00 pm	(2)	vs. (7) Air Force; Quarterfinals	W 73–50	22–9	Thomas & Mack Center; Paradise, NV
March 3, 2020; 9:30 pm	(2)	vs. (3) Wyoming; Semifinals	W 79–71	23–9	Thomas & Mack Center; Paradise, NV
March 4, 2020; 9:00 pm	(2)	vs. (1) Fresno State; Championship	W 80–76 ^{OT}	24–9	Thomas & Mack Center; Paradise, NV
NCAA tournament
Canceled					
*Non-conference game. ^{#}Rankings from AP Poll. (#) Tournament seedings in parentheses. All times are in Mountain Time.
