= 2008–09 Wyoming Cowgirls basketball team =

Intercollegiate basketball season

2008–09 Wyoming Cowgirls basketball

Mountain West Conference Tournament, Lost First Round
- Conference: Mountain West Conference
- Record: 16-14 ( Mountain West)
- Head coach: Joe Legerski
- Home arena: Arena-Auditorium (Capacity: 15,028)

The 2008–09 Wyoming Cowgirls basketball team represented the University of Wyoming in the 2008–2009 NCAA Division I basketball season. The Cowgirls were coached by, as the Cowgirls played their home games at the Arena-Auditorium in Laramie, Wyoming. The Cowgirls were a member of the Mountain West Conference and participated in the Mountain West Conference Tournament.

== Exhibition ==
Nov. 4/08	Laramie	CU – Colorado Springs	93	48	1-0
Nov. 7/08	Laramie	Metro State	79	49	2-0

== Regular season ==
- March 4: Despite giving up a 12-point halftime lead, the Wyoming Cowgirl basketball team (16-12 overall, 8-7 MWC) held on for a 57-55 overtime victory against the BYU Cougars (17-10 overall, 7-8 MWC) on the road in Provo. Emma Langford scored 15 points, five rebounds and three assists. Langford also had five rebounds off the bench. Hillary Carlson had 12 points and three blocked shots. Megan McGuffey recorded a career high 17 rebounds. The Cowgirls shot 21-54 (.389) from the field and 11-16 (.688) from the free throw line, while out rebounding the Cougars 44-42.
- March 7: The Wyoming Cowgirl basketball team (16-13 overall, 8-8 MWC) suffered a 63-45 loss against the New Mexico Lobos (20-9 overall, 9-7 MWC) in Albuquerque. Two Cowgirls finished the game in double-figures. Emma Langford with 12 points in her 25 minutes of play. Megan McGuffey had ten points and seven rebounds. Wyoming shot 15-54 (.278) from the field and 0-15 (.000) from beyond the arc.

=== Roster ===
Number	Name	Height	Position	Class
41	Hillary Carlson	6-3	Forward	Sophomore
45	Mallory Cline	6-4	Center	Junior
33	Elisabeth Dissen	6-1	Center	Senior
15	Leah Fitzgerald	6-2	Center	Freshman
22	Brenna Freeze	5-11	Guard	Freshman
14	Jade Kennedy	6-1	Forward	Sophomore
4	Gemma Koehler	6-1	Forward	Junior
21	Emma Langford	6-2	Forward	Freshman
24	Megan McGuffey	5-11	Guard	Senior
3	Randi Richardson	5-7	Guard	Redshirt Sophomore
12	Kristen Scheffler	5-11	Guard	Freshman
13	Ashley Sickl	6-1	Forward	Freshman
10	Rebecca Vanderjagt	6-3	Forward	Senior
20	Aubrey Vandiver	5-11	Guard	Junior

=== Schedule ===
Date	Location	Opponent	Cowgirls points	Opp. points	Record
Nov. 14/08	Denver, CO	Denver	61	54	1-0
Nov. 16/08	Missoula	Montana	64	71	1-1
Nov. 20/08	Laramie	North Dakota	100	75	2-1
Nov. 23/08	Laramie	Gonzaga	58	68	2-2
Nov. 25/08	Laramie	Boise State	62	55	3-2
Nov. 29/08	Eugene, OR	Oregon	45	51	3-3
Dec. 4/08	Ogden, Utah	Weber State	78	75	4-3
Dec. 6/08	Pocatello, Idaho	Idaho State	61	55	5-3
Dec. 13/08	Casper, Wyo.	North Dakota State	68	51	6-3

== MWC Tournament ==
The Cowgirls opened up play at the Mountain West Conference Tournament Tuesday, March 10, in Las Vegas. Their first-round opponent was the Colorado State Rams. The game started at 5:30 p.m. Mountain Time at the Thomas and Mack Center. The Wyoming Cowgirls basketball team (16-14 overall, 8-8 MWC) lost in the first round of the MWC Tournament by the final of 64-56 to the Colorado State Rams (10-20 overall, 4-12 MWC).

Three players finished the game by scoring in double-figures. Sophomore Hillary Carlson had 17 points and four rebounds. Emma Langford followed with 16 while Megan McGuffey added 13 in her final game as a Cowgirl. Kristen Scheffler had a team high six rebounds. Wyoming shot 19-54 (.352) from the field, 1-14 (.071) from the three-point line and 17-23 (.739) from the free throw line.

Amaka Uzomah, Bonnie Barbee and Zoi Simmon each finished with 11 points, while Uzomah led the way with nine rebounds. The Rams were 23-56 (.411) from the field, 14-21 (.667) from the free throw line and out rebounded the Cowgirls 39-29.

== Player stats ==
Player	Games played	Minutes	Field goals	Three pointers	Free throws	Rebounds	Assists	Blocks	Steals	Points

- Hillary Carlson averaged a team leading 11.6 points and 1.1 blocks, while adding 5.3 rebounds. She ranked among the Top 15 in scoring, blocks, field goal percentage and free throw percentage. She tallied 16 double-figure scoring games and two double-doubles.
- Megan McGuffey led the team with seven rebounds per contest, while adding 10.6 points and 2.52 assists. She ranked eighth in rebounding and 17th in scoring.
- Kristen Scheffler finished the regular season with 10.4 points along with 2.3 rebounds and 1.5 points. She was ranked second in three-point field goals made, 14th in three-point field goal percentage and 18th in scoring.
- Emma Langford came off the bench and averaged 10.3 points, 4.6 rebounds and 2.72 assists per game.

== Awards and honors ==
- Hillary Carlson earned Second Team All-Conference honors
- Megan McGuffey was named Third Team All-Conference
- Kristen Scheffler was selected Honorable Mention All-MWC
- Emma Langford was also given the Sixth Man of the Year Award

== Team players drafted into the WNBA ==
Round	Pick	Player	WNBA club

== See also ==
- 2008–09 Wyoming Cowboys basketball team
