= Mountain West Conference basketball tournament =

The phrase Mountain West Conference basketball tournament may refer to:

- Mountain West Conference men's basketball tournament
- Mountain West Conference women's basketball tournament
