= Gerald Mattinson =

American basketball coach (born 1958)

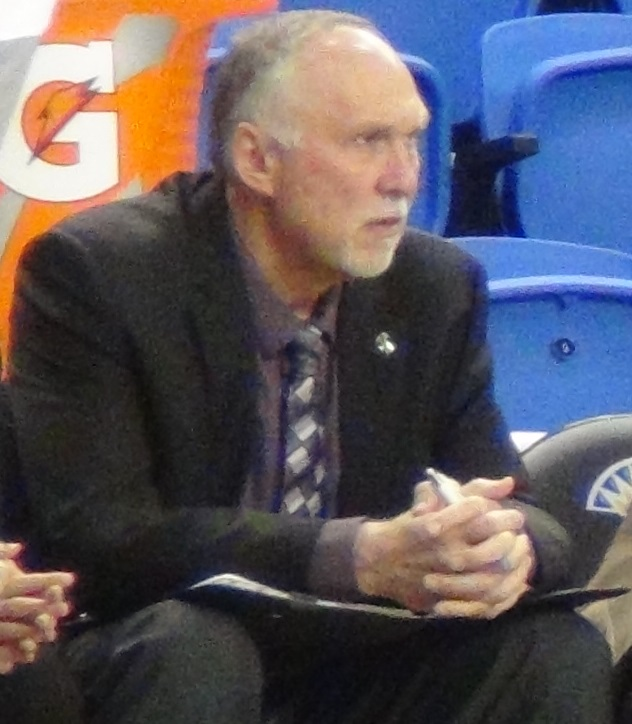
- Mattinson in 2017

Biographical details
- Born: November 6, 1958 (age 66); Rock Springs, Wyoming, U.S.

Playing career
- 1977–1978: Casper
- 1978–1981: Weber State
- Position(s): Forward

Coaching career (HC unless noted)
- 1981–1982: Weber State (men's assistant)
- 1982–1987: Rock Springs HS
- 1987–1990: Western Wyoming CC (men's assistant)
- 1991–1998: Western Wyoming CC (men's)
- 1998–1999: Western Wyoming CC (women's assistant)
- 2003–2019: Wyoming (assistant)
- 2019–2022: Wyoming

Head coaching record
- Overall: 48–35 (.578)
- Tournaments: NCAA: 0–1; WNIT: 2–1

Accomplishments and honors

Championships
- MW Tournament (2021)

Gerald Alan Mattinson (born November 6, 1958) is an American former basketball coach. He was a longtime women's basketball coach at the University of Wyoming, first as an assistant coach from 2003 to 2019 and head coach from 2019 to 2022.

== Early life and college career ==
A football and basketball player in high school, Mattinson graduated from Rock Springs High School in 1977. He then attended and played basketball for Casper College, earning All-American honors in his only season. In 1978, Mattinson transferred to Weber State College (now University) to play for Neil McCarthy. As a senior in 1980–81, Mattinson averaged 8.7 points, 6.2 rebounds, and 1.4 assists. Mattinson earned a bachelor of science degree in business education from Weber State in 1981.

== Coaching career ==
=== Early coaching career (1981–1999) ===
Upon graduation, Mattinson served as a graduate assistant for Weber State for one season. He then returned to Rock Springs High in 1982 to become a business education teacher and boys' basketball head coach; he coached the boys' basketball team through 1987. From 1987 to 1999, Mattinson coached at Western Wyoming Community College in many different capacities, starting as men's assistant coach from 1987 to 1990, men's head coach and assistant athletic director from 1991 to 1998, and women's basketball assistant coach from 1998 to 1999.

In 1999, Mattinson paused his basketball coaching career to become principal at East Junior High School in Rock Springs.

=== Wyoming assistant and head coach (2003–2022) ===
In 2003, Mattinson became an assistant coach under new head coach Joe Legerski at the University of Wyoming. Mattinson stayed on the staff for the entire 16-year tenure of Legerski, during which Wyoming went 314–186 with eight Women's National Invitation Tournament appearances, including the 2007 title, and an appearance in the 2008 NCAA tournament.

Following Legerski's retirement, Mattinson was promoted to head coach on May 7, 2019, with a three-year contract. Mattinson's debut season as head coach in 2019–20 was 17–12 overall including 12–6 in Mountain West Conference games for a third place tie in conference standings. The following season in 2020–21, Wyoming finished 14–10 (8–8 Mountain West). Entering the Mountain West championship tournament as the no. 7 seed, Wyoming won the tournament with a 59–56 win over no. 4 Fresno State on March 10, 2021. Wyoming appeared in the 2021 NCAA tournament on March 22, the program's first appearance in the tournament since 2008.

In 2021–22, Wyoming finished tied for third in Mountain West standings at 11–6 (15–12 overall). Wyoming advanced to the third round of the 2022 Women's National Invitation Tournament, losing 82–81 to UCLA in triple overtime at home on March 24, 2022.

On March 25, Mattinson announced his retirement from coaching. Mattinson completed his tenure with a 48–35 overall record. Heather Ezell, a longtime Wyoming assistant under both Legerski and Mattinson, was promoted to head coach the same day.

== Head coaching record ==
Statistics overview
Season	Team	Overall	Conference	Standing	Postseason
Wyoming Cowgirls (Mountain West Conference) (2019–2022)
2019–20	Wyoming	17–12	12–6	T–3rd	
2020–21	Wyoming	14–10	8–8	7th	NCAA round of 64
2021–22	Wyoming	17–13	11–6	T–3rd	WNIT Third Round
Wyoming:		48–35 (.578)	31–20 (.608)		
Total:		48–35 (.578)			
National champion Postseason invitational champion Conference regular season champion Conference regular season and conference tournament champion Division regular season champion Division regular season and conference tournament champion Conference tournament champion
