= 2019–20 Wyoming Cowgirls basketball team =

Intercollegiate basketball season

2019–20 Wyoming Cowgirls basketball
- Conference: Mountain West Conference
- Record: 18–12 (12–6 Mountain West)
- Head coach: Gerald Mattinson (1st season)
- Assistant coaches: Heather Ezell; Ryan Larsen; Fallon Lewis
- Home arena: Arena-Auditorium

2019–20 Mountain West Conference women's basketball standings
	Conf.				Overall
Team	W		L	PCT	W		L	PCT
Fresno State	16	–	2	.889	24	–	6	.800
Boise State †	13	–	5	.722	22	–	9	.710
Wyoming	12	–	6	.667	16	–	11	.593
San Jose State	12	–	6	.667	19	–	11	.633
San Diego State	9	–	9	.500	14	–	17	.452
UNLV	9	–	9	.500	13	–	17	.433
Nevada	7	–	11	.389	15	–	16	.484
Air Force	7	–	11	.389	10	–	21	.323
New Mexico	6	–	12	.333	15	–	17	.469
Colorado State	6	–	12	.333	12	–	18	.400
Utah State	2	–	16	.111	8	–	22	.267
† 2020 MW Tournament winner Rankings from AP poll

The 2019–20 Wyoming Cowgirls basketball team represented the University of Wyoming in the 2019–20 NCAA Division I women's basketball season. The Cowgirls were led by first-year head coach Gerald Mattinson, hired following the retirement of longtime coach Joe Legerski. The Cowgirls played their home games at the Arena-Auditorium in Laramie, Wyoming and were members of the Mountain West Conference.

The Cowgirls finished the season 17–12, 12–6 in Mountain West play, to finish in third place. They defeated Utah State in the Mountain West tournament before losing to Boise State in the semifinals. They did not play in a postseason tournament.

== Previous season ==
The Cowgirls finished the 2018–19 season 25–9, 13–5 in Mountain West play, to finish in third place. They defeated Utah State and San Diego State in the Mountain West tournament before losing to Boise State in the championship game. They advanced to the quarterfinals of the WNIT before losing to the eventual champion, Arizona. Longtime head coach Joe Legerski retired at the end of the season after 16 years as head coach.

== Offseason ==
Wyoming was picked to finish fourth in the Mountain West Conference by coaches and media.

== Roster ==
2019–20 Wyoming Cowgirls women's basketball team
Players
Coaches

Pos.	#	Name	Height	Year	Previous school	Hometown
G	1	Karla Erjavec	5 ft 10 in (1.78 m)	So	Sport Gymnasium	Zagreb, Croatia
F	2	Tereza Vitulova	6 ft 2 in (1.88 m)	So	Sportovni Gymnazium L Danka	Domašov, Czech Republic
G	3	Elisa Pilli	5 ft 7 in (1.7 m)	RS Sr	Liceo Scientifico Parini	Padova, Italy
F	4	Taylor Rusk	5 ft 11 in (1.8 m)	Sr	ThunderRidge HS	Highlands Ranch, CO
F	5	Jaye Johnson	5 ft 10 in (1.78 m)	Jr	Natrona County HS; Casper College	Casper, WY
F	10	Selale Kepenc	6 ft 2 in (1.88 m)	RS Jr	Bostenci Doga College	Istanbul, Turkey
G	11	Alba Sanchez Ramos	6 ft 0 in (1.83 m)	So	Colegio Torrevilano	Madrid, Spain
G	12	McKinley Bradshaw	5 ft 11 in (1.8 m)	Fr	Lyman HS	Lyman, WY
G	14	Quinn Weidemann	5 ft 9 in (1.75 m)	So	Westside HS	Omaha, NE
F	22	Paige Powell	6 ft 0 in (1.83 m)	Fr	Cody HS	Cody, WY
F	23	Jaeden Vaifanua	6 ft 1 in (1.85 m)	Fr	Corner Canyon HS	Draper, UT
G	24	Tommi Olson	5 ft 6 in (1.68 m)	So	Highlands Ranch HS	Worland, WY
G	32	Emily Buchanan	5 ft 6 in (1.68 m)	Jr	Southeast HS; Eastern Wyoming College	Yoder, WY
F	40	Coreen Labish	6 ft 2 in (1.88 m)	RS Sr	Mead HS	Cheney, WA

Head coach

- Gerald Mattinson (Weber State)

Assistant coach(es)

- Heather Ezell (Iowa State)
- Ryan Larsen (MSU Moorhead)
- Fallon Lewis (Wyoming)

Legend

- (C) Team captain
- (S) Suspended
- (I) Ineligible
- (W) Walk-on
- Injured
- Current redshirt

Roster
Last update: March 18, 2025

== Statistics ==
Player	GP	GS	MPG	FG%	3FG%	FT%	RPG	APG	SPG	BPG	PPG
McKinley Bradshaw	29	0	12.5	.361	.390	.756	2.2	0.7	0.3	0.1	4.7
Emily Buchanan	5	0	5.6	.333	.000	1.000	0.8	1.0	0.2	0.0	0.6
Karla Erjavec	22	18	26.9	.331	.309	.821	3.0	3.2	0.4	0.1	6.3
Jaye Johnson	24	0	7.0	.275	.231	.500	1.2	0.1	0.3	0.1	1.1
Selale Kepenc	27	0	8.6	.426	.378	.818	1.6	0.1	0.1	0.0	3.1
Tommi Olson	29	11	20.4	.350	.107	.250	3.4	2.5	1.2	0.1	1.6
Elisa Pilli	6	0	3.0	.500	.000	.000	0.2	0.5	0.2	0.0	0.7
Paige Powell	3	0	6.7	.714	.500	.000	2.0	0.0	0.0	0.3	3.7
Taylor Rusk	29	29	33.1	.450	.406	.647	4.9	2.6	1.0	0.2	10.2
Alba Sanchez-Ramos	29	29	30.7	.344	.257	.628	4.9	1.6	0.7	0.4	7.2
Jaeden Vaifanua	29	0	12.9	.487	.235	.870	4.1	0.1	0.3	0.6	7.1
Tereza Vitulova	29	29	25.1	.548	.442	.870	5.6	0.5	0.5	0.7	14.2
Quinn Weidemann	29	29	32.0	.421	.397	.878	2.6	1.8	1.0	0.2	10.2

== Schedule ==
Date time, TV	Rank^{#}	Opponent^{#}	Result	Record	Site (attendance) city, state
Exhibition
November 1, 2019*; 6:30 p.m.		Adams State	W 81–45	0–0	Arena-Auditorium (2,384); Laramie, WY
Non-conference regular season
November 6, 2019*; 6:30 p.m.		Colorado Christian	W 70–31	1–0	Arena-Auditorium (2,246); Laramie, WY
November 10, 2019*; 1:00 p.m.		Saint Mary's	W 69–67	2–0	Arena-Auditorium (2,402); Laramie, WY
November 14, 2019*; 7:00 p.m.		at Denver	L 57–71	2–1	Magness Arena; Denver, CO
November 17, 2019*; 1:00 p.m.		Colorado	L 56–66	2–2	Arena-Auditorium (2,531); Laramie, WY
November 23, 2019*; 5:00 p.m.		at South Dakota State	L 40–67	2–3	Frost Arena (1,499); Brookings, SD
November 25, 2019*; 6:00 p.m.		at North Dakota State	W 66–57	3–3	Scheels Center (449); Fargo, ND
November 30, 2019*; 2:00 p.m.		New Mexico Highlands	W 64-56	4-3	Arena-Auditorium; Laramie, WY
December 12, 2019*; 6:30 p.m.		Mississippi Valley State	W 95–22	6–3	Arena-Auditorium (2,270); Laramie, WY
December 15, 2019*; 1:00 p.m.		Northern Colorado	L 44–46	6–4	Arena-Auditorium (2,334); Laramie, WY
December 17, 2019*; 6:30 p.m.		No. 17 Gonzaga	L 54–65	6–5	Arena-Auditorium (2,432); Laramie, WY
Mountain West regular season
December 4, 2019; 6:30 p.m.		at Air Force	W 65–63	4–3 (1–0)	Clune Arena (252); Colorado Springs, CO
December 7, 2019; 2:00 p.m.		at New Mexico	W 73–66	5–3 (2–0)	Dreamstyle Arena (5,495); Albuquerque, NM
January 1, 2020; 6:30 p.m.		Boise State	W 73–68	7–5 (3–0)	Arena-Auditorium (2,395); Laramie, WY
January 4, 2020; 2:00 p.m.		Colorado State; Border War	L 49–56	7–6 (3–1)	Arena-Auditorium (3,257); Laramie, WY
January 8, 2020; 7:30 p.m.		at San Diego State	L 60–67 ^{OT}	7–7 (3–2)	Viejas Arena (347); San Diego, CA
January 11, 2020; 4:00 p.m.		at UNLV	L 53–65	7–8 (3–3)	Cox Pavilion (998); Paradise, NV
January 15, 2020; 6:30 p.m.		Nevada	W 83–59	8–8 (4–3)	Arena-Auditorium (2,270); Laramie, WY
January 18, 2020; 3:00 p.m.		at Fresno State	L 59–89	8–9 (4–4)	Save Mart Center; Fresno, CA
January 22, 2020; 6:30 p.m.		San Diego State	W 81–67	9–9 (5–4)	Arena-Auditorium (2,404); Laramie, WY
January 29, 2020; 7:00 p.m.		at Utah State	W 65–54	10–9 (6–4)	Smith Spectrum (437); Logan, UT
February 1, 2020; 1:00 p.m.		San Jose State	W 80–45	11–9 (7–4)	Arena-Auditorium (2,851); Laramie, WY
February 5, 2020; 7:00 p.m.		at Boise State	L 48–67	11–10 (7–5)	ExtraMile Arena (912); Boise, ID
February 8, 2020; 2:00 p.m.		New Mexico	L 71–74 ^{OT}	11–11 (7–6)	Arena-Auditorium (2,713); Laramie, WY
February 15, 2020; 2:00 p.m.		at Colorado State; Border War	W 43–40	12–11 (8–6)	Moby Arena (2,298); Fort Collins, CO
February 19, 2020; 6:30 p.m.		Utah State	W 64–45	13–11 (9–6)	Arena-Auditorium (2,430); Laramie, WY
February 22, 2020; 2:00 p.m.		Air Force	W 68–52	14–11 (10–6)	Arena-Auditorium (2,838); Laramie, WY
February 24, 2020; 7:30 p.m.		at Nevada	W 84–79	15–11 (11–6)	Lawlor Events Center (998); Reno, NV
February 27, 2020; 6:30 p.m.		Fresno State	W 64–55	16–11 (12–6)	Arena-Auditorium (2,724); Laramie, WY
Mountain West women's tournament
March 2, 2020; 9:30 p.m., MWN	(3)	vs. (11) Utah State; Quarterfinals	W 64–59	17–11	Thomas & Mack Center; Paradise, NV
March 3, 2020; 9:30 p.m., MWN	(3)	vs. (2) Boise State; Semifinals	L 71–79	17–12	Thomas & Mack Center; Paradise, NV
*Non-conference game. ^{#}Rankings from AP poll. (#) Tournament seedings in parentheses. All times are in Mountain.

== See also ==
- 2019–20 Wyoming Cowboys basketball team
