= 2022 Mountain West Conference women's basketball tournament =

- Classification: Division I
- Season: 2021–22
- Teams: 11
- Site: Thomas & Mack Center; Paradise, NV
- Television: Stadium, CBSSN

2021–22 Mountain West Conference women's basketball standings
| | Conf. | | | | Overall |
| Team | W | | L | PCT | W | | L | PCT |
|---|---|---|---|---|---|---|---|---|
| UNLV † | 15 | – | 3 | .833 | 26 | – | 7 | .788 |
| New Mexico | 14 | – | 4 | .778 | 26 | – | 10 | .722 |
| Wyoming | 11 | – | 6 | .647 | 17 | – | 13 | .567 |
| Nevada | 11 | – | 6 | .647 | 20 | – | 13 | .606 |
| Air Force | 11 | – | 7 | .611 | 19 | – | 14 | .576 |
| Colorado State | 9 | – | 9 | .500 | 21 | – | 12 | .636 |
| San Diego State | 8 | – | 10 | .444 | 15 | – | 16 | .484 |
| Fresno State | 7 | – | 10 | .412 | 11 | – | 18 | .379 |
| Utah State | 5 | – | 13 | .278 | 11 | – | 19 | .367 |
| Boise State | 4 | – | 13 | .235 | 8 | – | 21 | .276 |
| San Jose State | 2 | – | 16 | .111 | 5 | – | 25 | .167 |
† 2022 MW Tournament winner

The 2022 Mountain West Conference women's basketball tournament was held between March 6–9, 2022 at the Thomas & Mack Center on the campus of University of Nevada, Las Vegas, in Las Vegas, Nevada.

== Seeds ==
Teams were seeded by conference record, with a ties broken by record between the tied teams followed by record against the regular-season champion, if necessary.

| Seed | School | Conf | Tiebreaker |
|---|---|---|---|
| 1 | UNLV | 15-3 | |
| 2 | New Mexico | 14-4 | |
| 3 | Wyoming | 11-6 | 1–0 vs. Nevada |
| 4 | Nevada | 11-6 | 0-1 vs. Wyoming |
| 5 | Air Force | 11-7 | |
| 6 | Colorado State | 9–9 | |
| 7 | San Diego State | 8-10 | |
| 8 | Fresno State | 7–10 | |
| 9 | Utah State | 5-13 | |
| 10 | Boise State | 4-13 | |
| 11 | San Jose State | 2–16 | |

== Schedule ==
| Session | Game | Time | Matchup | Score | Television | Attendance |
First Round – Sunday, March 6
| 1 | 1 | 2:00 PM | No. 8 Fresno State vs. No. 9 Utah State | 75-80 | Stadium | |
| 1 | 2 | 4:30 PM | No. 7 San Diego State vs. No. 10 Boise State | 65-56 | Stadium | |
| 1 | 3 | 7:00 PM | No. 6 Colorado State vs. No. 11 San Jose State | 82-43 | Stadium | |
Quarterfinals – Monday, March 7
| 2 | 4 | 12:00 PM | No. 1 UNLV vs. No. 9 Utah State | 82-69 | Stadium | |
| 2 | 5 | 2:30 PM | No. 4 Nevada vs. No. 5 Air Force | 60-75 | Stadium | |
| 3 | 6 | 5:30 PM | No. 2 New Mexico vs. No. 7 San Diego State | 63-60 | Stadium | |
| 3 | 7 | 8:00 PM | No. 3 Wyoming vs. No. 6 Colorado State | 38-51 | Stadium | |
Semifinals – Tuesday, March 8
| 4 | 8 | 6:00 PM | No. 1 UNLV vs. No. 5 Air Force | 61-50 | Stadium | |
| 4 | 9 | 8:30 PM | No. 2 New Mexico vs. No. 6 Colorado State | 71-82 | Stadium | |
Championship Game – Wednesday, March 9
| 5 | 10 | 8:00 PM | No. 1 UNLV vs. No. 6 Colorado State | 75-65 | CBSSN | |
*Game Times in PT. ** denotes overtime.

== Bracket ==
First round Sunday, March 6
8 | Fresno State | 76
9 | Utah State | 80
7 | San Diego State | 65
10 | Boise State | 56
6 | Colorado State | 82
11 | San Jose State | 43

Quarterfinals; Monday, March 7
1 | UNLV | 82
9 | Utah State | 69
4 | Nevada | 60
5 | Air Force | 75
2 | New Mexico | 63
7 | San Diego State | 60
3 | Wyoming | 38
6 | Colorado State | 51

Semifinals; Tuesday, March 8
1 | UNLV | 61
5 | Air Force | 50
2 | New Mexico | 71
6 | Colorado State | 82

Championship; Wednesday, March 9
1 | UNLV | 75
6 | Colorado State | 65

* denotes overtime period

== See also ==
- 2022 Mountain West Conference men's basketball tournament
