= Gordy Presnell =

American women's basketball coach

Current position
- Title: Head coach
- Team: Boise State Broncos
- Conference: Pac-12

Biographical details
- Born: July 20, 1960 (age 65); Lapwai, Idaho, U.S.

Gordy Presnell (born July 20, 1960) is the women's basketball coach for Boise State University since 2005. Before joining Boise State, Presnell coached boys basketball teams for Lapwai High School and Kendrick High School during the 1980s. After joining Seattle Pacific University as a graduate assistant in 1986, Presnell became their women's basketball coach in 1987. With Seattle Pacific, Presnell's team won three Pacific West Conference events and reached the final of the 2005 NCAA Division II women's basketball tournament. Upon leaving the team in 2005, Presnell had 396 wins and 127 losses.

Presnell became the head coach of the women's basketball team at Boise State University in 2005. From 2007 to 2020, Presnell's team won the WAC women's basketball tournament once and the Mountain West Conference women's basketball tournament five times. In between this time period, Presnell and his team reached the second round of the 2008 Women's National Invitation Tournament and the 2014 Women's Basketball Invitational. With the two schools, Presnell received nine conference Coach of the Year awards from the 1990s to 2019. For Division II schools, Presnell won the WBCA National Coach of the Year Award in 2003 and 2004. As a women's basketball coach, Presnell won his 700th game in 2021.

== Early life and education ==
Presnell was born in Lapwai, Idaho on July 20, 1960. He started his basketball experience as a child while living at the Nez Perce Reservation. During his studies at Northwest Nazarene University, Presnell continued to play basketball throughout the early 1980s. He also briefly attended the University of Idaho in 1986. In the late 1980s, Presnell completed his education at Seattle Pacific University.

== Career ==
=== Early career ===
In the mid-1980s, Presnell was an assistant coach with Lapwai High School and Kendrick High School when they won Idaho championships in boys basketball. During this time period, Lapwai was the A-3 division winner in 1984 and Kendrick was the A-4 division winner in 1985. As the boys basketball coach for Kendrick, Presnell and his team were fifth at the A-4 division of the 1986 Idaho championships.

=== Seattle Pacific ===
In 1986, Presnell worked for Seattle Pacific in men's basketball as a graduate assistant. Starting in 1987, Presnell was the women's basketball coach for Seattle Pacific when they competed in the NAIA. While working as a coach for Seattle Pacific, Presnell also stocked ice cream trucks until 1989.

In 1991, Presnell's team began playing in the NCAA Division II. During the early 1990s, Seattle Pacific played in the Continental Divide Conference before joining the Pacific West Conference upon its creation in 1992. While in the Pacific West, Presnell's team won the conference in 1997 and 1998. Seattle Pacific won an additional Pacific West title in women's basketball during 2001.

That year, Seattle Pacific was scheduled to move into the newly established Great Northwest Athletic Conference. While part of the GNAC, Presnell and Seattle Pacific reached the final of the 2005 NCAA Division II women's basketball tournament in March 2005. Upon leaving the team in June 2005, Presnell had accumulated 396 wins and 127 losses, won six conference championships and reached the postseason 14 times with Seattle Pacific.

=== Boise State ===
Presnell became the coach of the women's basketball team at Boise State University in 2005. While with Boise State, Presnell and the team were the 2007 WAC women's basketball tournament champions. In 2011, the school joined the Mountain West Conference. Between 2015 and 2020, Presnell and his team won the Mountain West Conference women's basketball tournament five times. At the NCAA Division I women's basketball tournament, Presnell and his team reached the first round in 2007.

In the early 2010s, Presnell considered taking a sabbatical to look after his ill mother. From 2015 to 2019, Presnell and Boise State appeared in four more NCAA Tournaments. Presnell's team had received a spot in the 2020 edition before the COVID-19 pandemic stopped the NCAA event from happening. During this time period, Boise State reached the second round of the 2008 Women's National Invitation Tournament and the 2014 Women's Basketball Invitational. By 2023, Presnell had 334 wins and 227 losses with Boise State and entered the 2023-24 season with the 10th most wins among active Division I women's basketball head coaches.

== Head coaching record ==
Pacific West Basketball championships record book, NCAA Coaching records, NCAA DII, Mountain West standings, Boise State Schedule, Western Athletic Conference record book

Record table
Season	Team	Overall	Conference	Standing	Postseason
Seattle Pacific Falcons (Independent) (1987–1990)
1987–88	Seattle Pacific	16–11			
1988–89	Seattle Pacific	24–6			NAIA district tournament second round
1989–90	Seattle Pacific	21–9			NAIA district tournament second round
1990–91	Seattle Pacific	18–11			
Seattle Pacific (NAIA):		79–37			
Seattle Pacific Falcons (Continental Divide Conference) (1991–1992)
1991–92	Seattle Pacific	17–13			
Seattle Pacific (Division II):		17–13			
Seattle Pacific Falcons (Pacific West Conference) (1922–2001)
1992–93	Seattle Pacific	17–10			
1993–94	Seattle Pacific	17–10			
1994–95	Seattle Pacific	21–8			NCAA DII Second Round
1995–96	Seattle Pacific	17–10			
1996–97	Seattle Pacific	26–3			NCAA DII Sweet Sixteen
1997–98	Seattle Pacific	27–3			NCAA DII Elite Eight
1998–99	Seattle Pacific	19–10			NCAA DII First Round
1999–00	Seattle Pacific	21–7			NCAA DII First Round
2000–01	Seattle Pacific	24–5			NCAA DII Sweet Sixteen
Seattle Pacific (Division II):		189–66			
Seattle Pacific Falcons (Great Northwest Athletic Conference) (2001–2005)
2001–02	Seattle Pacific	22–6			NCAA DII First Round
2002–03	Seattle Pacific	29–1			NCAA DII Sweet Sixteen
2003–04	Seattle Pacific	30–1			NCAA DII Elite Eight
2004–05	Seattle Pacific	30–3			NCAA DII Runner-up
Seattle Pacific (Division II):		61–26 (.701)			
Seattle Pacific (Division II):		346–142 (.709)			
Boise State Broncos (Western Athletic Conference) (2005–2011)
2005–06	Boise State	15–15	6–10	6th	
2006–07	Boise State	24–9	12–4	1st	NCAA First Round
2007–08	Boise State	24–8	14–2	1st	
2008–09	Boise State	16–15	9–7	T-5th	
2009–10	Boise State	19–12	8–8	T-4th	
2010–11	Boise State	12–19	3–13	8th	
Boise State (Western Athletic Conference):		110–78 (.585)	52–44 (.542)		
Boise State Broncos (Mountain West Conference) (2011–2026)
2011–12	Boise State	15–16	5–9	6th	
2012–13	Boise State	12–19	4–12	7th	
2013–14	Boise State	18–14	12–6	3rd	WBI Second Round
2014–15	Boise State	22–11	10–7	T-4th	NCAA First Round
2015–16	Boise State	27–16	19–11	2nd	
2016–17	Boise State	27–8	13–6	3rd	NCAA First Round
2017–18	Boise State	23–10	14–4	1st	NCAA First Round
2018–19	Boise State	28–5	16–2	1st	NCAA First Round
2019–20	Boise State	24–9	13–5	2nd	
2020–21	Boise State	14–9	10–8	6th	
2021–22	Boise State	8–21	4–13	10th	
2022–23	Boise State	17–16	11–7	6th	
2023–24	Boise State	21–13	10–8	T-5th	WNIT First round
2024–25	Boise State	18–15	7–11	T–7th	
2025–26	Boise State	25–9	14–6	T–4th	
2026–27	Boise State	0–0	0–0		
Boise State (Mountain West):		299–167 (.642)	162–115 (.585)		
Total:		409–269 (.603)	214–159 (.574)		
National champion Postseason invitational champion Conference regular season champion Conference regular season and conference tournament champion Division regular season champion Division regular season and conference tournament champion Conference tournament champion

== Awards ==
In women's basketball, Presnell was Coach of the Year three times for Seattle Pacific as a member of the Pacific West Conference during the 1990s. He received an additional Coach of the Year award from the PWC in 2001. In the GNAC, Presnell was named Coach of the Year consecutively from 2003 to 2005.

During this time period, he won the WBCA National Coach of the Year Award in 2003 and 2004 for Division II schools. While at Boise State, Presnell received the 2007 Coach of the Year award with the Western Athletic Conference. He also was named Coach of the Year for the Mountain West Conference in 2019.

== Overall performance and personal life ==
Overall, Presnell won his 600th women's basketball game in 2016. In 2021, he won his 700th game. In May 2024, his alma mater, Northwest Nazarene, awarded him an honorary doctorate degree. Presnell has two kids and is married.

== See also ==
- List of college women's basketball career coaching wins leaders
