= 2021–22 Colorado State Rams women's basketball team =

Intercollegiate basketball season

2021–22 Colorado State Rams women's basketball

WNIT, First Round
- Conference: Mountain West Conference
- Record: 21–12 (9–9 Mountain West)
- Head coach: Ryun Williams (10th season)
- Assistant coaches: Rico Burkett; Kyley Bachand; Amber Cunningham
- Home arena: Moby Arena

2021–22 Mountain West Conference women's basketball standings
	Conf.				Overall
Team	W		L	PCT	W		L	PCT
UNLV †	15	–	3	.833	26	–	7	.788
New Mexico	14	–	4	.778	26	–	10	.722
Wyoming	11	–	6	.647	17	–	13	.567
Nevada	11	–	6	.647	20	–	13	.606
Air Force	11	–	7	.611	19	–	14	.576
Colorado State	9	–	9	.500	21	–	12	.636
San Diego State	8	–	10	.444	15	–	16	.484
Fresno State	7	–	10	.412	11	–	18	.379
Utah State	5	–	13	.278	11	–	19	.367
Boise State	4	–	13	.235	8	–	21	.276
San Jose State	2	–	16	.111	5	–	25	.167
† 2022 MW Tournament winner

The 2021–22 Colorado State Rams women's basketball team represented Colorado State University in the 2021–22 NCAA Division I women's basketball season. The Rams, led by tenth year head coach Ryun Williams, played their home games at Moby Arena, and are members of the Mountain West Conference. They finished the season 21–12, 9–9 in Mountain West play to finish in 6th place in the conference. The Rams advanced to the championship game of the Mountain West women's basketball tournament, beating 11 seed San Jose State, and upsetting 3 seed Wyoming and 2 seed New Mexico, before falling short to 1 seed UNLV 75–65 in the championship. The Rams earned an invite to the 2022 WNIT, where they fell to Portland in the 1st round, 72–63.

== Roster ==
2021–22 Colorado State Rams women's basketball team
Players
Coaches

Pos.	#	Name	Height	Year	Previous school	Hometown
F	0	Kendyll Kinzer	6 ft 1 in (1.85 m)	Jr	Lewiston HS; Fresno State	Lewiston, ID
F	3	Jess Moors	6 ft 0 in (1.83 m)	Fr	Westlake Girls HS	Auckland, NZ
G	4	McKenna Hofschild (C)	5 ft 2 in (1.57 m)	Jr	Prior Lake HS; Seton Hall	Prior Lake, MN
G	5	Upe Atosu	5 ft 9 in (1.75 m)		Scholars Imperial; Butler	Edo State, Nigeria
G/F	11	Petra Farkas	5 ft 11 in (1.8 m)	Sr	Kecskemet TE; College of Southern Idaho	Kecskemét, Hungary
F	12	Clara Gomez	6 ft 1 in (1.85 m)	Fr	Segle XXI	Sabadell, Spain
F	22	Cali Clark	6 ft 3 in (1.91 m)	So	Cherry Creek HS	Centennial, CO
G	23	Anna Prim	5 ft 6 in (1.68 m)	Fr	Segle XXI	Lleida, Spain
G/F	24	Sydney Mech	6 ft 2 in (1.88 m)	RS Jr	Cherry Creek HS; DU	Englewood, CO
G/F	32	Makayla Hemingway	5 ft 11 in (1.8 m)	So	Cherokee Trail HS	Aurora, CO
G	33	Bengisu Alper	5 ft 11 in (1.8 m)	RS Jr	Florya Doga Anataolian - Fenerbahce S.K. Maine	Istanbul, Turkey
F	42	Karly Murphy (C)	6 ft 1 in (1.85 m)		River Falls HS; Wisconsin Green Bay	River Falls, WI

Head coach

- Ryun Williams (South Dakota)

Assistant coach(es)

- Rico Burkett (North Dakota)
- Kyley Bachand (Illinois)
- Amber Cunningham (South Dakota)

Legend

- (C) Team captain
- (S) Suspended
- (I) Ineligible
- (W) Walk-on
- Injured
- Current redshirt

Roster

== Statistics ==
Player	GP	GS	MPG	FG%	3FG%	FT%	RPG	APG	SPG	BPG	PPG
Kendyll Kinzer	33	33	34.2	.434	.408	.600	6.5	2.3	.6	.9	9.5
Jess Moors	13	0	6.2	.250	.250	.500	1.6	0.2	0.0	.2	0.5
McKenna Hofschild	33	33	36.2	.423	.320	.795	4.0	6.5	.5	.1	16.9
Upe Atosu	33	32	33.2	.382	.375	.803	2.5	1.7	1.0	0.0	14.8
Petra Farkas	33	18	23.2	.339	.265	.889	2.3	.7	.7	.2	4.9
Clara Gomez	23	0	6.2	.250	.000	1.000	1.1	.3	.2	.0	.5
Cali Clark	32	3	13.3	.478	.391	.741	5.0	0.4	.5	.4	4.9
Anna Prim	23	0	7.8	.308	.238	.833	0.7	0.8	0.3	.0	1.5
Sydney Mech	22	16	28.6	.492	.422	.588	2.7	1.0	.5	1.7	7.1
Makayla Hemingway	10	0	4.1	.250	.200	.000	0.7	0.3	.2	.1	0.7
Bengisu Alper	15	0	8.5	.200	.143	.538	1.5	0.5	.1	.0	1.3
Karly Murphy	32	30	25.5	.480	.111	.768	8.8	0.9	.7	.2	11.3

== Schedule ==
Date time, TV	Rank^{#}	Opponent^{#}	Result	Record	Site (attendance) city, state
Exhibition
11/03/2021*; 6:00 pm		Chadron State	W 78–43		Moby Arena (919); Fort Collins, CO
Non-conference regular season
11/09/2021*; 5:00 pm		CCU	W 77-42	1–1	Moby Arena; Fort Collins, CO
11/12/2021*; 5:30 pm		Northern Colorado	W 61–50	2–0	Moby Arena; Fort Collins, CO
11/15/2021*; 6:00 pm		Oral Roberts	W 71–56	3–0	Moby Arena (862); Fort Collins, CO
11/18/2021*; 7:00 pm		at Denver	W 67–43	4–0	Hamilton Gymnasium (376); Denver, CO
11/21/2021*; 12:00 pm		Lipscomb	W 81–55	5–0	Moby Arena (902); Fort Collins, CO
11/28/2021*; 12:00 pm	No. 10	Louisville	L 56–71	5-1	Moby Arena (1,336); Fort Collins, CO
12/04/2021*; 3:30 pm		vs. Harvard	W 59–52	6–1	Desert Financial Arena (1,700); Tempe, AZ
12/05/2021*; 2:30 pm		vs. UTSA	W 52–48	7–1	Desert Financial Arena (1,530); Tempe, AZ
12/08/2021*; 6:00 pm		Weber State	W 73–60	8–1	Moby Arena (830); Fort Collins, CO
12/12/2021*; 12:00 pm		CSU-Pueblo	W 64–45	9–1	Moby Arena (1,009); Fort Collins, CO
Mountain West regular season
12/28/2021; 6:00 pm		Boise State	W 81–77	10–1 (1-0)	Moby Arena (1,209); Fort Collins, CO
01/03/2022; 7:00 pm		at San Diego State	L 63–73	10–2 (1–1)	Viejas Arena (254); San Diego, CA
01/09/2022; 12:00 pm		San José State	W 90–64	11–2 (2–1)	Moby Arena (931); Fort Collins, CO
01/13/2022; 6:00 pm		Air Force	L 52–77	11–3 (2–2)	Moby Arena (838); Fort Collins, CO
01/15/2022; 1:00 pm		New Mexico	L 74–85	11–4 (2–3)	Moby Arena (1,166); Fort Collins, CO
01/19/2022; 6:00 pm		at Utah State	W 88–72	12–4 (3–3)	Smith Spectrum (398); Logan, UT
01/22/2022; 2:00 pm		at Boise State	L 64–69	12–5 (3–4)	ExtraMile Arena (796); Boise, ID
01/24/2022; 7:00 pm		at Fresno State	W 78–67	13–5 (4–4)	Save Mart Center (789); Fresno, CA
01/27/2022; 6:00 pm		Nevada	W 66–55	14–5 (5–4)	Moby Arena (1,542); Fort Collins, CO
02/02/2022; 7:00 pm		at New Mexico	L 73–81	14–6 (5–5)	The Pit; Albuquerque, NM
02/05/2022; 1:00 pm		at Air Force	L 63–67	14–7 (5–6)	Clune Arena (468); Colorado Springs, CO
02/09/2022; 6:00 pm		Utah State; Orange Out	W 86–83	15–7 (6-6)	Moby Arena (1,124); Fort Collins, CO
02/12/2022; 3:00 pm		at San Jose State	W 84–70	16–7 (7–6)	Provident Credit Union Event Center (274); San Jose, CA
02/17/2022; 6:00 pm		Wyoming	W 56–45	17–7 (8–6)	Moby Arena (1,433); Fort Collins, CO
02/20/2022; 3:00 pm		at Nevada	W 62–55	18–7 (9–6)	Lawlor Events Center (1,481); Reno, NV
02/24/2022; 6:00 pm		San Diego State	L 61–69	18–8 (9–7)	Moby Arena (1,081); Fort Collins, CO
02/26/2022; 1:00 pm		UNLV	L 69–80	18–9 (9–8)	Moby Arena (2,454); Fort Collins, CO
03/02/2022; 6:30 pm		at Wyoming	L 63–69 ^{OT}	18–10 (9–9)	Arena-Auditorium (2,375); Laramie, WY
Mountain West Women's Tournament
03/06/2022; 8:00 pm	(6)	vs. (11) San Jose State; First Round	W 82–43	19–10	Thomas & Mack Center; Paradise, NV
03/07/2022; 9:30 pm	(6)	vs. (3) Wyoming; Quarterfinals	W 51–38	20–10	Thomas & Mack Center; Paradise, NV
03/08/2022; 8:30 pm	(6)	vs. (2) New Mexico; Semifinals	W 82–71	21–10	Thomas & Mack Center; Paradise, NV
03/09/2022; 8:00 pm	(6)	vs. (1) UNLV; Championship	L 65–75	21–11	Thomas & Mack Center; Paradise, NV
WNIT
03/18/2022*; 8:00 pm		at Portland; First Round	L 63–72	21–12	Chiles Arena (602); Portland, OR
*Non-conference game. ^{#}Rankings from AP Poll. (#) Tournament seedings in parentheses. All times are in Mountain Time.
