= 1975 AIAW National Large College Basketball Championship =

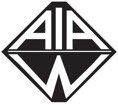

Tournament information
- Dates: March 19, 1975–March 22, 1975
- Administrator: Association for Intercollegiate Athletics for Women
- Host(s): Madison College
- Venue(s): Harrisonburg, Virginia
- Participants: 16

Final positions
- Champions: Delta State (1st title)
- Runner-up: Immaculata

Tournament statistics
- Matches played: 27

The 1975 AIAW women's basketball tournament was held from March 19 to 22, 1975, at Madison College in Harrisonburg, Virginia. Sixteen teams participated and Delta State University, coached by Hall of Famer Margaret Wade, was crowned national champion. It finished the season undefeated (28–0), becoming the second undefeated national champion.

== Brackets ==
=== Main ===
First round* March 19, 1975
Immaculata | 63
Kansas State | 54
Wayland Baptist | 93
Boise State | 37
William Penn | 43
Cal State Fullerton | 59
Queens College | 83
Madison College | 50
Delta State | 77†
Federal City | 75
Tennessee Tech | 91
Utah State | 45
S. Connecticut St. | 68
Stephen F. Austin | 51
Ohio State | 72
West Georgia | 59

Quarterfinals*; March 20, 1975
Immaculata | 68
Wayland Baptist | 58
Cal State Fullerton | 64
Queens College | 58
Delta State | 88
Tennessee Tech | 66
S. Connecticut St. | 73
Ohio State | 50

Semifinals; March 21, 1975
Immaculata | 63
Cal State Fullerton | 54
Delta State | 71
S. Connecticut St. | 68

Final; March 22, 1975
Immaculata | 81
Delta State | 90
Third place
Cal State Fullerton | 63
S. Connecticut St. | 46

*Losers in the first round and quarterfinals continued in the consolation bracket (below)

† Overtime

=== Consolation ===
First round March 20, 1975
Kansas State | 65
Boise State | 37
William Penn | 76
Madison College | 40
Federal City | 89
Utah State | 34
Stephen F. Austin | 82
West Georgia | 62

Second round March 20, 1975
Ohio State | 51
Kansas State | 61
Tennessee Tech | 65
William Penn | 67†
Queens College | 97
Federal City | 99‡
Wayland Baptist | 50
Stephen F. Austin | 46

Third round March 21, 1975
Kansas State | 54
William Penn | 43
Federal City | 46
Wayland Baptist | 67†

Fifth place game March 22, 1975
Kansas State | 55
Wayland Baptist | 63

† Overtime

‡ Double-overtime
