= Mike Bradbury =

American basketball coach (born 1969)

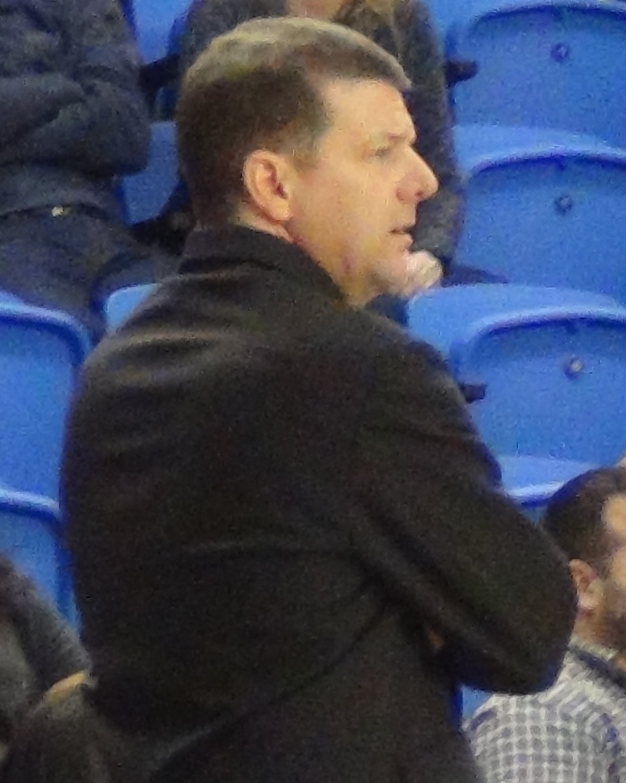
- Bradbury in 2017

Current position
- Title: Assistant coach
- Team: Louisville
- Conference: ACC

Biographical details
- Born: 1969 (age 56–57); Chattanooga, Tennessee, U.S.
- Education: Chattanooga ('93)

Coaching career (HC unless noted)
- 1994–1995: East Tennessee State (assistant)
- 1995–1996: VCU (assistant)
- 1996–2002: Cincinnati (assistant)
- 2002–2007: Xavier (assistant)
- 2007–2010: Morehead State
- 2010–2016: Wright State
- 2016–2026: New Mexico
- 2026–present: Louisville (assistant)

Head coaching record
- Overall: 380–230 (.623)
- Tournaments: 0–1 (NCAA); 4–6 (WNIT); 2–3 (WBI)

Accomplishments and honors

Championships
- Horizon League Tournament (2014); Mountain West regular season (2021)

Awards
- Mountain West Coach of the Year (2024)

Michael Downs Bradbury (born 1969) is an American college basketball coach who the head coach of the New Mexico Lobos women's basketball team from 2016 to 2026, Wright State from 2010 to 2016, and Morehead State from 2007 to 2010.

== Coaching history ==
Bradbury served as an assistant coach at Xavier from 2002 until 2007, Cincinnati from 1996 until 2002, and VCU from 1995 until 1996 after beginning his career as an assistant coach at ETSU from 1994 until 1995. He spent the 1991–92 and 1992–93 seasons as a student assistant coach at Chattanooga before his first full-time assistant coaching assignment.

From 2007 to 2010, Bradbury led Morehead State to a 50–44 record over the course of three seasons, including a 22–11 record and a bid to the WBI in his final season as head coach. The 22-win mark set the school's NCAA-era record for victories in a season, and the 14–4 conference mark in the same year set the school's single season conference wins record and was also the highest conference winning percentage in a season in school history.

At Wright State from 2010 to 2016, Bradbury had five seasons with 20 or more wins and led the school to its first NCAA Tournament appearance in 2014, in addition to WBI appearances in 2011 and 2012 and WNIT appearances in 2015 and 2016.

On March 31, 2016, New Mexico hired Bradbury as head women's basketball coach. Bradbury was fired in March 2026 following the conclusion of the 2025–26 season.

== Personal life ==
Bradbury was born in Chattanooga, Tennessee. He is married and has two sons, Alex and Chris, and a daughter, Sena Nicole. Sena was adopted from Ethiopia in April 2010, shortly after Bradbury accepted the head coaching position at Wright State.

== Head coaching record ==
Record table
Season	Team	Overall	Conference	Standing	Postseason
Morehead State Eagles (Ohio Valley Conference) (2007–2010)
2007–08	Morehead State	11–19	9–11	T–6th	
2008–09	Morehead State	17–14	11–7	4th	
2009–10	Morehead State	22–11	14–4	2nd	WBI first round
Morehead State:		50–44 (.532)	34–22 (.607)		
Wright State Raiders (Horizon League) (2010–2016)
2010–11	Wright State	20–13	11–7	4th	WBI second round
2011–12	Wright State	21–13	12–6	3rd	WBI second round
2012–13	Wright State	12–18	6–10	5th	
2013–14	Wright State	26–9	12–4	2nd	NCAA first round
2014–15	Wright State	25–9	12–4	2nd	WNIT first round
2015–16	Wright State	24–11	12–6	T–2nd	WNIT first round
Wright State:		128–73 (.637)	53–31 (.631)		
New Mexico Lobos (Mountain West Conference) (2016–2026)
2016–17	New Mexico	15–15	10–8	5th	
2017–18	New Mexico	25–11	10–8	6th	WNIT third round
2018–19	New Mexico	24–7	14–4	2nd	WNIT first round
2019–20	New Mexico	15–17	6–12	T–9th	
2020–21	New Mexico	15–5	11–3	1st	WNIT first round
2021–22	New Mexico	26–10	14–4	2nd	WNIT third round
2022–23	New Mexico	21–13	12–6	T–3rd	WNIT second round
2023–24	New Mexico	21–11	12–6	2nd	
2024–25	New Mexico	18–14	11–7	4th	
2025–26	New Mexico	22–10	14–6	4th	
New Mexico:		202–113 (.641)	114–64 (.640)		
Total:		380–230 (.623)			
National champion Postseason invitational champion Conference regular season champion Conference regular season and conference tournament champion Division regular season champion Division regular season and conference tournament champion Conference tournament champion
