= Dagný Lísa Davíðsdóttir =

Icelandic basketball player

Personal information
- Born: 2 January 1997 (age 29)
- Listed height: 185 cm (6 ft 1 in)

Career information
- High school: Westtown (West Chester, Pennsylvania)
- College: Niagara (2016–2020); Wyoming (2020–2021)
- Playing career: 2011–2024
- Position: Center

Career history
- 2010–2014: Hamar
- 2021: Hamar/Þór
- 2021–2023: Fjölnir
- 2024: Grindavík

Career highlights
- Úrvalsdeild Domestic Player of the Year (2022); Úrvalsdeild Domestic All-First Team (2022); 1. deild kvenna winner (2013)

Dagný Lísa Davíðsdóttir (born 2 January 1997) is an Icelandic former basketball player. She played college basketball for Niagara University and later the University of Wyoming. She was named the Úrvalsdeild Domestic Player of the Year in 2022 after leading Fjölnir to its best record in history.

== Playing career ==
=== Early career ===
Dagný grew up in Hveragerði, Iceland, and started playing basketball with Hamar's junior teams at the age of six. At the age of 11, she started practicing with the boys team as there where not enough girls her age to practice with. Two years later, she was brought into the senior team where she played until 2014, winning the 1. deild kvenna in 2013.

=== High school ===
In 2014, she moved to the United States where she attended and played basketball for Westtown School in Pennsylvania for two years. During her senior season, she appeared in 13 games and averaged 8.6 points, 4.6 rebounds and 1.3 assists per game.

=== College ===
In 2016, she received a full basketball scholarship to attend Niagara University. She played four seasons at Niagara, serving as a captain her final season while earning her bachelor's degree, as well as a master's degree. As she had redshirted her junior season due to an injury, she had one year of college eligibility when she graduated from Niagara. For her last season she decided to transfer to the University of Wyoming. During the 2020–21 season, she helped the Wyoming Cowgirls to the Mountain West Conference Tournament championship. In March 2021, she became the second Icelandic woman, after Helena Sverrisdóttir, to appear in the NCAA March Madness. There, the Cowgirls lost in the first round against UCLA. During the season, she averaged 8.8 points and 5.7 rebounds per game.

=== Return to Iceland ===
Following her college season, she returned to Iceland and joined the joint team of Hamar/Þór in the 1. deild kvenna. She appeared in four regular season games, averaging 20.0 points and 11.8 rebounds per game. In the playoffs, Hamar/Þór lost to Ármann in the first round with Dagný averaging 41.5 points and 17.5 rebounds in the two games.

In June 2021, Dagný signed with Úrvalsdeild kvenna club Fjölnir. In her debut, she had 18 points and 17 rebounds in an 83–55 victory against Breiðablik in the Icelandic Cup. On 15 September she helped Fjölnir to a 65–60 victory against Njarðvík in the Cup semi-finals. In the Cup Final, she posted 18 points and 12 rebounds in Fjölnir's 89–94 loss to Haukar. On December 1, she scored a season high 30 points in a victory against Keflavík. The following game, she had 25 points and a season high 20 rebounds in a victory against Haukar. Following the season, she was named the Úrvalsdeild Domestic Player of the Year and to the Úrvalsdeild Domestic All-First Team.

On 7 December 2022, Dagný Lísa suffered a broken arm in a game against Haukar and missed the rest of the season. In 12 games, she averaged 12.3 points and 8.1 rebounds per game. Despite the break healing in a few weeks, a damaged ligament kept her from returning the following season.

On 16 January 2024, it was announced that Dagný had signed with Grindavík.

In September 2024, Dagný announced her retirement from basketball.

== Trophies and awards ==
=== Trophies ===
- 1. deild kvenna :
  - 2013
- Mountain West Conference Tournament champion:
  - 2021

== Personal life ==
Dagný's mother is politician Guðrún Hafsteinsdóttir.
