= 2019–20 New Mexico Lobos women's basketball team =

American college basketball season

2019–20 New Mexico Lobos women's basketball
- Conference: Mountain West Conference
- Record: 15-17 (6-12 MW)
- Head coach: Mike Bradbury (4th season)
- Assistant coaches: Valerie King; Bill Ferrara; Symone Denham
- Home arena: Dreamstyle Arena

2019–20 Mountain West Conference women's basketball standings
	Conf.				Overall
Team	W		L	PCT	W		L	PCT
Fresno State	16	–	2	.889	24	–	6	.800
Boise State †	13	–	5	.722	22	–	9	.710
Wyoming	12	–	6	.667	16	–	11	.593
San Jose State	12	–	6	.667	19	–	11	.633
San Diego State	9	–	9	.500	14	–	17	.452
UNLV	9	–	9	.500	13	–	17	.433
Nevada	7	–	11	.389	15	–	16	.484
Air Force	7	–	11	.389	10	–	21	.323
New Mexico	6	–	12	.333	15	–	17	.469
Colorado State	6	–	12	.333	12	–	18	.400
Utah State	2	–	16	.111	8	–	22	.267
† 2020 MW Tournament winner Rankings from AP poll

The 2019–20 New Mexico Lobos women's basketball team represented the University of New Mexico during the 2018–19 NCAA Division I women's basketball season. The Lobos were led by fourth year head coach Mike Bradbury. They played their home games at Dreamstyle Arena and are a member of the Mountain West Conference.

== Previous season ==
They finished the previous season 24–7, 14–4 in Mountain West play to finish in second place. They lost in the quarterfinals of the Mountain West Conference women's basketball tournament to San Diego State. They received an automatic bid to the Women's National Invitation Tournament where they got upset by Denver in the first round.

== Roster ==
2019–20 New Mexico Lobos women's basketball team
Players
Coaches

Pos.	#	Name	Height	Year	Previous school	Hometown
G	0	Andriana Avent	5 ft 10 in (1.78 m)	Fr	Sacramento HS	Sacramento, CA
PG	1	Corina Carter	5 ft 6 in (1.68 m)	RS Fr	Judson HS	San Antonio, TX
G/F	3	Ahlise Hurst	5 ft 9 in (1.75 m)	So	Bendigo Senior Secondary College	Bendigo, Australia
G	4	Jayla Everett	5 ft 10 in (1.78 m)	So	Kirkwood HS	St. Louis, MO
F	5	Jordan Hosey	6 ft 1 in (1.85 m)	Sr	Manvel HS; Texas	Houston, TX
F	12	Bride Kennedy-Hopoate	6 ft 4 in (1.93 m)	RS Sr	Northwest Florida State College; Hutchinson Community College; Iowa State	Brisbane, Australia
F	13	Shaiquel Robertson	5 ft 8 in (1.73 m)	So	Trotwood-Madison HS	Trotwood, OH
G	14	Najala Howell	5 ft 8 in (1.73 m)	RS Sr	DeSoto HS; UTEP	DeSoto, TX
G	15	Aisia Robertson	5 ft 8 in (1.73 m)	RS Sr	Bishop O'Dowd HS; Kansas	San Francisco, CA
G	23	Jaedyn De La Cerda	5 ft 6 in (1.68 m)	Jr	Roswell HS	Roswell, NM
F	24	Autumn Watts	6 ft 1 in (1.85 m)	Fr	Highlands Ranch HS	Centennial, CO
F	25	Azaria Robinson	6 ft 2 in (1.88 m)	Fr	West HS	Anchorage, AK
G/F	32	Antonia Anderson	6 ft 2 in (1.88 m)	Jr	Byron P. Steele II HS	Cibolo, TX

Head coach

- Mike Bradbury (Chattanooga)

Assistant coach(es)

- Valerie King (Cincinnati)
- Erin Grant (Texas Tech)
- Bill Ferrara (Florida)

Legend

- (C) Team captain
- (S) Suspended
- (I) Ineligible
- (W) Walk-on
- Injured
- Current redshirt

Roster

== Schedule and results ==
Date time, TV	Rank^{#}	Opponent^{#}	Result	Record	Site (attendance) city, state
Exhibition
Oct 27, 2019*; 7:00 pm		Colorado–Colorado Springs	W 103-54		Dreamstyle Arena (4015); Albuquerque, NM
Oct 30, 2019*; 2:00 pm		Eastern New Mexico	W 99-56		Dreamstyle Arena (4129); Albuquerque, NM
Non-conference regular season
Nov 5, 2019*; 7:00 pm		UC Riverside	W 80-70	1-0	Dreamstyle Arena (4349); Albuquerque, NM
Nov 8, 2019*; 7:00 pm		Northern Arizona	W 83-76	2-0	Dreamstyle Arena (4856); Albuquerque, NM
Nov 12, 2019*; 7:00 pm		Houston	W 81-71	3-0	Dreamstyle Arena (4825); Albuquerque, NM
Nov 17, 2019*; 2:00 pm		at New Mexico State; Rio Grande Rivalry	W 86-67	4-0	Pan American Center (944); Las Cruces, NM
Nov 19, 2019*; 11:00 am		at UTEP	W 93-78	5-0	Don Haskins Center (1352); El Paso, TX
Nov 28, 2019*; 2:00 pm		vs. Missouri; Cancun Challenge	W 71-68	6-0	Hard Rock Hotel Riviera Maya (302); Cancun, Mexico
Nov 29, 2019*; 2:00 pm		vs. No. 23 West Virginia; Cancun Challenge	L 60-73	6-1	Hard Rock Hotel Riviera Maya; Cancun, Mexico
Dec 4, 2019; 7:00 p.m.		at Boise State	L 82-83 ^{OT}	6-2 (0-1)	ExtraMile Arena (829); Boise, ID
Dec 7, 2019; 2:00 pm		Wyoming	L 66-73	6-3 (0-2)	Dreamstyle Arena (5495); Albuquerque, NM
Dec 10, 2019*; 7:00 pm		Northern New Mexico	W 92-44	7-3	Dreamstyle Arena (3996); Albuquerque, NM
Dec 14, 2019*; 2:00 p.m.		at Arizona State	L 47-84	7-4	Wells Fargo Arena (2037); Tempe
Dec 16, 2019*; 7:00 p.m.		New Mexico State; Rio Grande Rivalry	W 107-53	8-4	Dreamstyle Arena (5092); Albuquerque, NM
Dec 18, 2019*; 7:00 pm		Providence; Lobo Invitational	W 86-68	9-4	Dreamstyle Arena (4574); Albuquerque, NM
Dec 19, 2019*; 7:00 pm		Loyola Marymount; Lobo Invitational	L 72-73	9-5	Dreamstyle Arena (4535); Albuquerque, NM
Dec 20, 2019*; 7:00 pm		Ball State; Lobo Invitational	L 57-70	9-6	Dreamstyle Arena (4728); Albuquerque, NM
Jan 1, 2020; 7:00 pm		San José State	L 80-81	9-7 (0-3)	Dreamstyle Arena (4918); Albuquerque, NM
Jan 8, 2020; 7:00 p.m.		at Fresno State	L 81-84 ^{OT}	9-8 (0-4)	Save Mart Center (2228); Fresno, CA
Jan 11, 2020; 2:00 p.m.		at Air Force	W 75-53	10-8 (1-4)	Clune Arena (401); Colorado Springs, CO
Jan 15, 2020; 7:00 pm		Colorado State	W 73-62	11-8 (2-4)	Dreamstyle Arena (5306); Albuquerque, NM
Jan 18, 2020; 2:00 pm		UNLV	L 51-68	11-9 (2-5)	Dreamstyle Arena (5326); Albuquerque, NM
Jan 22, 2020; 12:00 p.m.		at San José State	L 85-89	11-10 (2-6)	Event Center Arena (1863); San Jose, CA
Jan 25, 2020; 1:00 pm		Nevada	W 87-67	12-10 (3-6)	Dreamstyle Arena (4856); Albuquerque, NM
Jan 29, 2020; 12:00 p.m.		at San Diego State	L 74-75	12-11 (3-7)	Viejas Arena (5320); San Diego, CA
Feb 1, 2020; 2:00 pm		Fresno State	L 78-84	12-12 (3-8)	Dreamstyle Arena (5242); Albuquerque, NM
Feb 8, 2020; 2:00 p.m.		at Wyoming	W 74-71 ^{OT}	13-12 (4-8)	Arena-Auditorium (2713); Laramie, WY
Feb 12, 2020; 7:00 pm		San Diego State	L 58-67	13-13 (4-9)	Dreamstyle Arena (4753); Albuquerque, NM
Feb 15, 2020; 2:00 pm		at UNLV	W 80-64	14-13 (5-9)	Cox Pavilion (864); Paradise, NV
Feb 19, 2020; 7:30 p.m.		at Nevada	L 78-86 ^{OT}	14-14 (5-10)	Lawlor Events Center (956); Reno, NV
Feb 22, 2020; 2:00 pm		Boise State	L 76-95	14-15 (5-11)	Dreamstyle Arena (5338); Albuquerque, NM
Feb 24, 2020; 7:00 pm		Air Force	L 66-79	14-16 (5-12)	Dreamstyle Arena (4728); Albuquerque, NM
Feb 27, 2020		at Utah State	W 54-52	15-16 (6-12)	Smith Spectrum (388); Logan, UT
Mountain West Women's Tournament
Mar 1, 2020	(9)	(8) Nevada	L 64-74	15-17	Thomas & Mack Center (N/A); Paradise, NV
*Non-conference game. ^{#}Rankings from AP Poll. (#) Tournament seedings in parentheses. All times are in Mountain Time.

== See also ==
2019-20 New Mexico Lobos men's basketball team
