= 2021 Mountain West Conference women's basketball tournament =

2021 women's college basketball tournament

- Classification: Division I
- Season: 2020–21
- Teams: 10
- Site: Thomas & Mack Center; Paradise, Nevada
- Champions: Wyoming (1st title)
- Winning coach: Gerald Mattinson (1st title)
- MVP: Quinn Weidemann (Wyoming)
- Television: Stadium/MWN, CBSSN

2020–21 Mountain West Conference women's basketball standings
	Conf.				Overall
Team	W		L	PCT	W		L	PCT
New Mexico	11	–	3	.786	15	–	5	.750
UNLV	13	–	5	.722	15	–	9	.625
Colorado State	11	–	5	.688	15	–	6	.714
Fresno State	12	–	6	.667	17	–	11	.607
Nevada	9	–	7	.563	13	–	9	.591
Boise State	10	–	8	.556	14	–	9	.609
Wyoming†	8	–	8	.500	14	–	10	.583
San Jose State	1	–	2	.333	2	–	3	.400
San Diego State	5	–	12	.294	7	–	17	.292
Air Force	4	–	14	.222	8	–	18	.308
Utah State	2	–	16	.111	4	–	20	.167
† 2021 MW Tournament winner San Jose State suspended their season on January 14, 2021; As of July 7, 2024; Rankings from AP poll

The 2021 Mountain West women's basketball tournament (officially known as the 2021 Air Force Reserve Mountain West Women's Basketball Championship due to sponsorship reasons) was the postseason women's basketball tournament for the 2020–21 season in the Mountain West Conference. The tournament was held March 11–13, 2021 at the Thomas & Mack Center on the campus of University of Nevada, Las Vegas, in Las Vegas, Nevada. The tournament winner received an automatic invitation to the 2021 NCAA Division I women's basketball tournament. Wyoming won the conference tournament championship game over Fresno State, 59–56.

== Seeds ==
All remaining ten MW schools were eligible to participate in the tournament. Teams were seeded by conference record with a tiebreaker system to seed teams with identical percentages. The top four teams received byes into the tournament quarterfinals. The remaining teams played in the first round. Tie-breaking procedures remained unchanged from the 2020 tournament.

- Head-to-head record between the tied teams
- Record against the highest-seeded team not involved in the tie, going down through the seedings as necessary
- Higher NET

Seed	School	Conference	Tiebreaker 1
1	New Mexico	11–3	
2	UNLV	13–5	
3	Colorado State	11–5	
4	Fresno State	12–6	
5	Nevada	9–7	
6	Boise State	10–8	
7	Wyoming	8–8	
8	San Diego State	5–12	
9	Air Force	4–14	
10	Utah State	2–16	

== Schedule ==
Game	Time*	Matchup^{#}	Score	Television
First Round – Sunday, March 7, 2021
1	2:00 p.m.	No. 8 San Diego State vs. No. 9 Air Force	48-56	Stadium/MWN
2	4:30 p.m.	No. 7 Wyoming vs. No. 10 Utah State	69-41	Stadium/MWN
Quarterfinals – Monday, March 8, 2021
3	12:00 p.m.	No. 1 New Mexico vs. No. 9 Air Force	67-51	Stadium/MWN
4	2:30 p.m.	No. 4 Fresno State vs. No. 5 Nevada	70-46	Stadium/MWN
5	5:30 p.m.	No. 2 UNLV vs. No. 7 Wyoming	56-72	Stadium/MWN
6	8:00 p.m.	No. 3 Colorado State vs. No. 6 Boise State	65-78	Stadium/MWN
Semifinals – Tuesday, March 9, 2021
7	5:00 p.m.	No. 1 New Mexico vs. No. 4 Fresno State	72-77	Stadium/MWN
8	7:30 p.m.	No. 6 Boise State vs. No. 7 Wyoming	38-53	Stadium/MWN
Championship – Wednesday, March 10, 2021
9	8:00 p.m.	No. 4 Fresno State vs. No. 7 Wyoming	56-59	CBSSN
*All times Pacific. ^{#}Rankings denote tournament seeding.

== Bracket ==
First Round; Sunday, March 7 Stadium/MWN
8	San Diego State	48
9	Air Force	56
7	Wyoming	69
10	Utah State	41

Quarterfinals; Monday, March 8 Stadium/MWN
1	New Mexico	67
9	Air Force	51
4	Fresno State	70
5	Nevada	46
2	UNLV	56
7	Wyoming	72
3	Colorado State	65
6	Boise State	78

Semifinals; Tuesday, March 9 Stadium/MWN
1	New Mexico	72
4	Fresno State	77
6	Boise State	38
7	Wyoming	53

Final; Wednesday, March 10; CBSSN
4	Fresno State	56
7	Wyoming	59

== See also ==
- 2021 Mountain West Conference men's basketball tournament
- Mountain West Conference women's basketball tournament
