= Mountain West Conference women's basketball tournament =

- Conference basketball championship
- Sport: Basketball
- Conference: Mountain West Conference
- Number of teams: 10
- Format: Single-elimination tournament
- Current stadium: Thomas & Mack Center
- Current location: Las Vegas, Nevada
- Played: 2000–present
- Last contest: 2026
- Current champion: Colorado State Rams (3)
- Most championships: Boise State Broncos, New Mexico Lobos (5)
- Official website: Mountain West Conference Women's Basketball

The Mountain West Conference women's basketball tournament is the conference championship tournament in women's basketball for the Mountain West Conference. It is a single-elimination tournament involving all of the 11 league schools, and seeding is based on regular-season records with head-to-head match-up as a tie-breaker. The winner receives the conference's automatic bid to the NCAA women's basketball tournament.

In the first round, the #8 seed plays the #9 seed, the #7 seed plays the #10 seed, and the #6 seed plays the #11 seed, with the 3 top seeds (ranked by conference record) play the winners of those respective games, while the #4 and #5 seed play each other. The winners of the four games play each other in the Semifinals, and the winner of those two games play off against each other to determine the champion.

== Results ==
Year	Champion	Score	Runner-up	Location
2000	Utah (1)	61–47	BYU	Las Vegas, NV (Thomas & Mack Center)
2001	Colorado State (1)	59–56	BYU	Las Vegas, NV (Thomas & Mack Center)
2002	BYU (1)	61–46	UNLV	Las Vegas, NV (Thomas & Mack Center)
2003	New Mexico (1)	52–46	BYU	Las Vegas, NV (Thomas & Mack Center)
2004	New Mexico (2)	71–50	Utah	Denver, CO (Pepsi Center)
2005	New Mexico (3)	47–37	Utah	Denver, CO (Pepsi Center)
2006	Utah (2)	84–60	BYU	Denver, CO (Pepsi Center)
2007	New Mexico (4)	63–49	BYU	Las Vegas, NV (Thomas & Mack Center)
2008	New Mexico (5)	62–59	San Diego State	Las Vegas, NV (Thomas & Mack Center)
2009	Utah (3)	63–58	San Diego State	Las Vegas, NV (Thomas & Mack Center)
2010	San Diego State (1)	70–60 (OT)	Utah	Las Vegas, NV (Thomas & Mack Center)
2011	Utah (4)	52–47 (OT)	TCU	Las Vegas, NV (Thomas & Mack Center)
2012	San Diego State (2)	57–43	Utah	Las Vegas, NV (Thomas & Mack Center)
2013	Fresno State (1)	76–70	San Diego State	Las Vegas, NV (Thomas & Mack Center)
2014	Fresno State (2)	77–68	Colorado State	Las Vegas, NV (Thomas & Mack Center)
2015	Boise State (1)	66–60	Colorado State	Las Vegas, NV (Thomas & Mack Center)
2016	Colorado State (2)	55–54	Fresno State	Las Vegas, NV (Thomas & Mack Center)
2017	Boise State (2)	66–53	Fresno State	Las Vegas, NV (Thomas & Mack Center)
2018	Boise State (3)	62–60	Nevada	Las Vegas, NV (Thomas & Mack Center)
2019	Boise State (4)	68–51	Wyoming	Las Vegas, NV (Thomas & Mack Center)
2020	Boise State (5)	80–76 (OT)	Fresno State	Las Vegas, NV (Thomas & Mack Center)
2021	Wyoming (1)	59–56	Fresno State	Las Vegas, NV (Thomas & Mack Center)
2022	UNLV (1)	75–65	Colorado State	Las Vegas, NV (Thomas & Mack Center)
2023	UNLV (2)	71-60	Wyoming	Las Vegas, NV (Thomas & Mack Center)
2024	UNLV (3)	66–49	San Diego State	Las Vegas, NV (Thomas & Mack Center)
2025	San Diego State (3)	72–68 (3OT)	UNLV	Las Vegas, NV (Thomas & Mack Center)
2026	Colorado State (3)	56–42	Air Force	Las Vegas, NV (Thomas & Mack Center)

== Champions ==
School	Championships	Championship Years
Boise State	5	2015, 2017, 2018, 2019, 2020
New Mexico	5	2003, 2004, 2005, 2007, 2008
Utah	4	2000, 2006, 2009, 2011
Colorado State	3	2001, 2016, 2026
San Diego State	3	2010, 2012, 2025
UNLV	3	2022, 2023, 2024
Fresno State	2	2013, 2014
BYU	1	2002
Wyoming	1	2021

- Air Force, Grand Canyon, Nevada, and San José State have not yet won a Mountain West tournament.
- TCU and Utah State never won a Mountain West tournament as conference members.
- Schools highlighted in light purple are former members of the Mountain West.

== See also ==
- Mountain West Conference men's basketball tournament
