= Joe Legerski =

Basketball coach

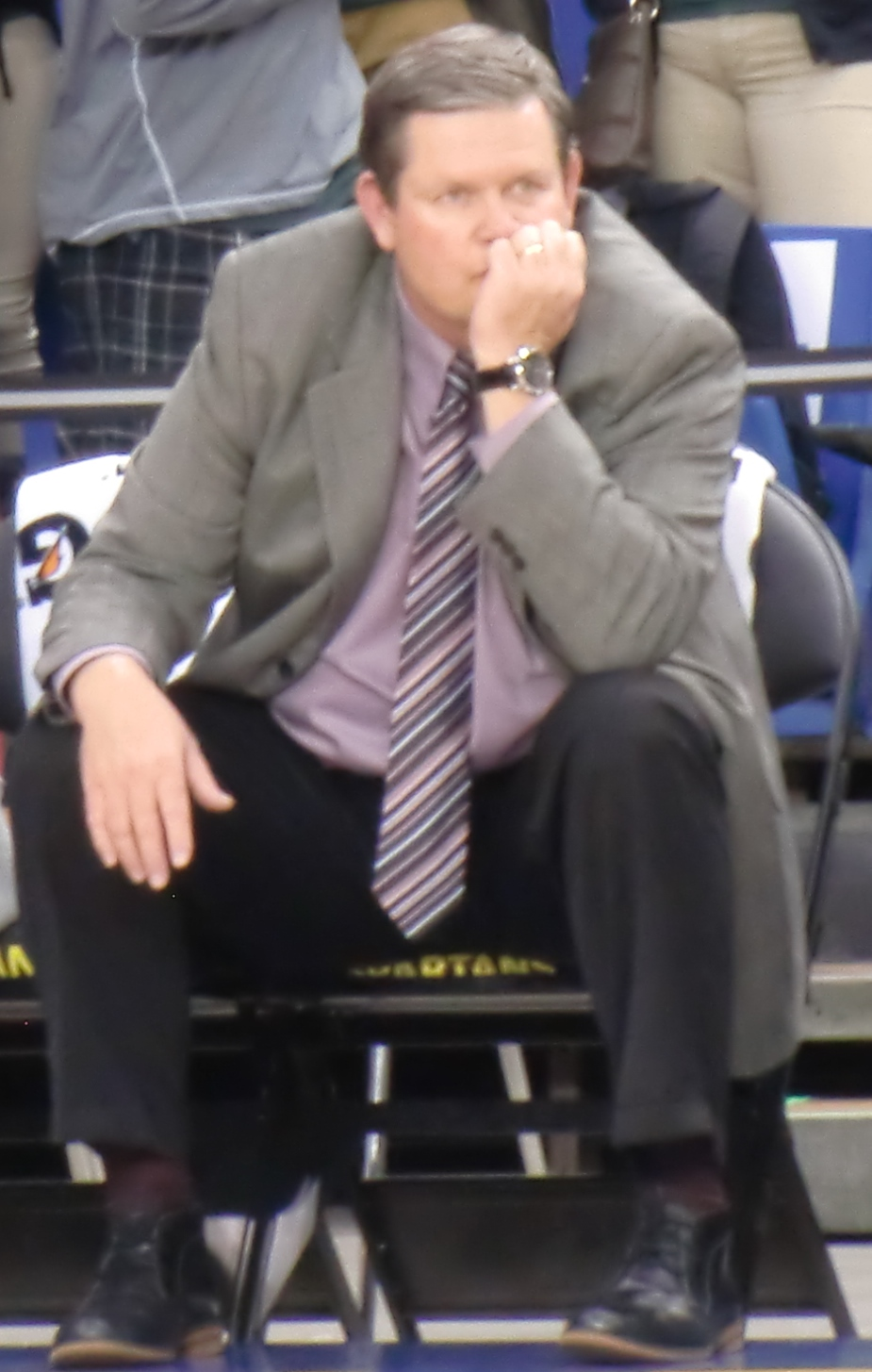
- Legerski at the Event Center in 2016

Biographical details
- Born: July 24, 1957 (age 69); Rock Springs, Wyoming, U.S.
- Education: University of Wyoming

Coaching career (HC unless noted)
- 1979–1984: Rock Springs HS (boys' asst.)
- 1984–1986: Rock Springs HS (girls')
- 1986–1987: Western Wyoming CC
- 1987–1991: Wyoming (asst.)
- 1991–1998: Utah (asst.)
- 1998–2003: Utah (assoc. HC)
- 2003–2019: Wyoming

Head coaching record
- Overall: 314–186 (.628)
- Tournaments: NCAA: 0–1; WNIT: 16–7

Accomplishments and honors

Championships
- WNIT (2007)

Awards
- 3× MWC Coach of the Year (2004, 2017, 2018)

Joseph Julius Legerski (born July 24, 1957) is the retired former head women's basketball coach at the University of Wyoming.

== Coaching career ==
Legerski earned a Bachelor of Science degree in business education from the University of Wyoming in 1979. After graduating from Wyoming, Legerski became a boys' varsity basketball assistant coach at Rock Springs High School, a position he would hold for five seasons. From 1984 to 1986, Legerski was the head women's basketball coach at Rock Springs High School. Following one season as head women's basketball coach at Western Wyoming Community College, Legerski was an assistant with the Wyoming Cowgirls basketball team from 1987 through 1991.

From 1992 to 2003, Legerski was assistant coach at the University of Utah under Elaine Elliott; he was associate head coach from 1998 to 2003. During his time as an assistant, Utah won three conference tournament championships between the Western Athletic Conference (1991 and 1995) and Mountain West Conference (2000).

Named head coach at Wyoming on May 1, 2003, Legerski was the sixth head coach in team history and is the winningest coach in Wyoming history. He led the Cowgirls to ten 20+ winning seasons, 8 appearances in the WNIT, and 1 appearance in the NCAA tournament. He also led the Cowgirls to the only postseason tournament championship in program history, the 2007 WNIT.

During the 2018–2019 season Legerski won his 300th career game as the head coach of the Cowgirls. He was the first coach in program history to reach 300 career wins. He also took the team to their first ever Mountain West Tournament Championship appearance in the 2018–2019 season.

He won 3 Mountain West Conference coach of the year awards, in the 2003–04, 2016–17, and 2017–18 seasons.

On April 24, 2019, Legerski announced that he would not be returning for the next season, as he planned to retire from coaching after 16 years.

== Personal life ==
Legerski is married and has three children, including stepson Zane Beadles, a former NFL offensive guard.

== Head coaching record ==
Record table
Season	Team	Overall	Conference	Standing	Postseason
Wyoming Cowgirls (Mountain West Conference) (2003–2019)
2003–04	Wyoming	11–18	6–8	5th	
2004–05	Wyoming	16–12	7–7	4th	
2005–06	Wyoming	21–9	10–6	5th	WNIT Second Round
2006–07	Wyoming	27–9	11–5	T–2nd	WNIT Champions
2007–08	Wyoming	24–7	12–4	3rd	NCAA first round
2008–09	Wyoming	16–14	8–8	T–5th	
2009–10	Wyoming	21–12	9–7	T–5th	WNIT Third Round
2010–11	Wyoming	24–9	12–4	3rd	WNIT Third Round
2011–12	Wyoming	12–17	7–7	5th	
2012–13	Wyoming	24–8	12–4	3rd	WNIT First Round
2013–14	Wyoming	20–11	10–8	5th	
2014–15	Wyoming	16–14	10–8	T–5th	
2015–16	Wyoming	13–16	6–12	T–8th	
2016–17	Wyoming	22–10	13–5	2nd	WNIT Second Round
2017–18	Wyoming	22–11	13–5	3rd	WNIT Second Round
2018–19	Wyoming	25–9	13–5	3rd	WNIT Quarterfinals
Wyoming:		314–186 (.628)	161–103 (.610)		
Total:		314–186 (.628)			
National champion Postseason invitational champion Conference regular season champion Conference regular season and conference tournament champion Division regular season champion Division regular season and conference tournament champion Conference tournament champion
