= 2020 Mountain West Conference women's basketball tournament =

- Classification: Division I
- Season: 2019–20
- Teams: 11
- Site: Thomas & Mack Center; Paradise, NV
- Champions: Boise State (5th title)
- Winning coach: Gordy Presnell (5th title)
- MVP: A’Shanti Coleman (Boise State)
- Attendance: 7,305
- Television: Stadium, CBSSN

2019–20 Mountain West Conference women's basketball standings
	Conf.				Overall
Team	W		L	PCT	W		L	PCT
Fresno State	16	–	2	.889	24	–	6	.800
Boise State †	13	–	5	.722	22	–	9	.710
Wyoming	12	–	6	.667	16	–	11	.593
San Jose State	12	–	6	.667	19	–	11	.633
San Diego State	9	–	9	.500	14	–	17	.452
UNLV	9	–	9	.500	13	–	17	.433
Nevada	7	–	11	.389	15	–	16	.484
Air Force	7	–	11	.389	10	–	21	.323
New Mexico	6	–	12	.333	15	–	17	.469
Colorado State	6	–	12	.333	12	–	18	.400
Utah State	2	–	16	.111	8	–	22	.267
† 2020 MW Tournament winner Rankings from AP poll

The 2020 Mountain West Conference women's basketball tournament was held between March 1–4, 2020 at the Thomas & Mack Center on the campus of University of Nevada, Las Vegas, in Las Vegas, Nevada.

Boise State was the winner, earning the conference's automatic bid to the 2020 NCAA Division I women's basketball tournament.

== Seeds ==
Teams were seeded by conference record, with a ties broken by record between the tied teams followed by record against the regular-season champion, if necessary.

Seed	School	Conf	Tiebreaker
1	Fresno State	16–2	
2	Boise State	13–5	
3	Wyoming	12–6	1–0 vs. San Jose State
4	San Jose State	12–6	0–1 vs. Wyoming
5	UNLV	9–9	1–1 vs. San Diego State, 0–1 vs. Fresno State
6	San Diego State	9–9	1–1 vs. San Diego State, 0–2 vs. Fresno State
7	Air Force	7–11	1–1 vs. Nevada, 1–1 vs. Fresno State
8	Nevada	7–11	1–1 vs. Air Force, 0–1 vs. Fresno State
9	New Mexico	6–12	1–0 vs. Colorado State
10	Colorado State	6–12	0–1 vs. New Mexico
11	Utah State	2–16	

== Schedule ==
Session	Game	Time*	Matchup^{#}	Television	Attendance
First Round – Sunday, March 1
1	1	2:00 PM	#8 Nevada, 74 vs. #9 New Mexico, 64	Stadium	1,320
1	2	4:30 PM	#7 Air Force 60 vs. #10 Colorado State 48	Stadium	1,320
1	3	7:00 PM	#6 San Diego State 79, vs. #11 Utah State 81	Stadium	1,320
Quarterfinals – Monday, March 2
2	4	12:00 PM	#1 Fresno State 75 vs. #8 Nevada 71	Stadium	1,287
2	5	2:30 PM	#4 San Jose State 67 vs. #5 UNLV 48	Stadium	1,287
3	6	5:30 PM	#2 Boise State 73 vs. #7 Air Force 50	Stadium	1,366
3	7	8:00 PM	#3 Wyoming 64 vs. #11 Utah State 59	Stadium	1,366
Semifinals – Tuesday, March 3
4	8	6:00 PM	#1 Fresno State 94 vs. #4 San Jose State 68	Stadium	1,718
4	9	8:30 PM	#2 Boise State 79 vs. #3 Wyoming 71	Stadium	1,718
Championship Game – Wednesday, March 4
5	10	8:00 PM	#1 Fresno State 76 vs. #2 Boise State 80**	CBSSN	1,614
*Game Times in PT. ** denotes overtime.

== Bracket ==
First round Sunday, March 1
8	Nevada	74
9	New Mexico	64
7	Air Force	60
10	Colorado State	48
6	San Diego State	79
11	Utah State	81*

Quarterfinals; Monday, March 2
1	Fresno State	75
8	Nevada	71
4	San Jose State	67
5	UNLV	48
2	Boise State	73
7	Air Force	50
3	Wyoming	64
11	Utah State	59

Semifinals; Tuesday, March 3
1	Fresno State	94
4	San Jose State	68
2	Boise State	79
3	Wyoming	71

Championship; Wednesday, March 4
1	Fresno State	76
2	Boise State	80*

* denotes overtime period

== See also ==
- 2020 Mountain West Conference men's basketball tournament
