= Boise State Broncos women's basketball =

Boise State Broncos
2026–27 Boise State Broncos women's basketball team
- University: Boise State University
- Head coach: Gordy Presnell (22nd season)
- Location: Boise, Idaho
- Arena: ExtraMile Arena (capacity: 12,820)
- Conference: Pac-12
- Nickname: Broncos
- Colors: Blue and orange
- Student section: The Corral

NCAA Division I tournament appearances
- 1994, 2007, 2015, 2017, 2018, 2019

AIAW tournament appearances
- 1975

Conference tournament champions
- 2007, 2015, 2017, 2018, 2019, 2020

Conference regular-season champions
- 1992, 1994, 2007, 2008, 2018, 2019

Uniforms
Home	Away	Alternate

The Boise State Broncos women's basketball is the team that is representing Boise State University in Boise, Idaho, United States. The school's team currently competes in the Pac-12 Conference. They play their home games at ExtraMile Arena.

== History ==
The Broncos played in the Northwest Women's Basketball League from 1977 to 1982, then moved to Mountain West Athletic Conference from 1982 to 1988, followed by the Big Sky Conference from 1988 to 1995, next it was the Big West Conference from 1996 to 2001, the Western Athletic Conference from 2001 to 2010, before joining the Mountain West Conference in 2011.

Season	Record	Conference record	Postseason finish	Coach
1970–71	8–1	n/a	AIAW NW Region Tournament “B” Champions	Connie Thorngren
1971–72	15–2	n/a	n/a	Connie Thorngren
1972–73	9–4	n/a	n/a	Connie Thorngren
1973–74	14–1	n/a	n/a	Connie Thorngren
1974–75	22–3	n/a	AIAW NW Region Tournament Champions, AIAW National Top 16	Connie Thorngren
1975–76	15–6	n/a	AIAW NW Region Tournament 2nd place	Connie Thorngren
1976–77	18–4	n/a	AIAW NW Region Tournament 2nd place	Connie Thorngren
1977–78	17–6	11–2 (T-1st Mountain Division)	NWBL Tournament	Connie Thorngren
1978–79	8–15	3–8 (4th Mountain Division)	n/a	Connie Thorngren
1979–80	9–15	3–10 (T-4th Mountain Division)	n/a	Connie Thorngren
1980–81	8–19	3–9 (5th Mountain Division)	n/a	Connie Thorngren
1981–82	15–13	7–5 (4th AIAW Division)	n/a	Connie Thorngren
1982–83	10–16	4–10 (7th)	n/a	Connie Thorngren
1983–84	11–16	4–10 (6th)	n/a	Connie Thorngren
1984–85	13–14	5–9 (T-4th)	n/a	Tony Oddo
1985–86	13–13	5–9 (T-5th)	n/a	Tony Oddo
1986–87	10–17	2–10 (7th)	n/a	Tony Oddo
1987–88	18–10	10–6 (4th)	MWAC Semifinals	Tony Oddo
1988–89	18–10	10–6 (T-3rd)	BSC Semifinals	Tony Oddo
1989–90	19–12	11–5 (T-2nd)	BSC Semifinals	June Daugherty
1990–91	12–15	8–8 (5th)	n/a	June Daugherty
1991–92	22–7	14–2 (1st)	BSC Final – 2nd place	June Daugherty
1992–93	19–8	9–5 (3rd)	BSC Semifinals	June Daugherty
1993–94	23–6	12–2 (T-1st)	BSC Final – 2nd place NCAA 1st Round	June Daugherty
1994–95	16–11	10–4 (2nd)	BSC Semifinals	June Daugherty
1995–96	12–15	9–5 (T-2nd)	BSC Quarterfinals	June Daugherty
1996–97	9–17	7–7 (4th Eastern Division)	BWC Quarterfinals	Trisha Stevens
1997–98	19–11	11–3 (1st Eastern Division)	BWC Final – 2nd place WNIT 1st Round	Trisha Stevens
1998–99	13–14	7–7 (3rd Eastern Division)	BWC Quarterfinals	Trisha Stevens
1999-00	14–14	7–7 (3rd Eastern Division)	BWC Quarterfinals	Trisha Stevens
2000–01	12–17	7–7 (T-4th)	BWC Semifinals	Trisha Stevens
2001–02	10–20	5–13 (8th)	WAC Quarterfinals	Trisha Stevens
2002–03	10–20	6–12 (8th)	WAC Quarterfinals	Jen Warden
2003–04	9–20	5–13 (9th)	WAC Quarterfinals	Jen Warden
2004–05	10–19	4–14 (9th)	WAC Quarterfinals	Jen Warden
2005–06	15–15	6–10 (6th)	WAC Semifinals	Gordy Presnell
2006–07	24–9	12–4 (T-1st)	WAC Tournament Champions; NCAA 1st Round	Gordy Presnell
2007–08	24–8	14–2 (T-1st)	WAC Semifinals; WNIT 2nd Round	Gordy Presnell
2008–09	16–15	9–7 (T-5th)	WAC Quarterfinals	Gordy Presnell
2009–10	19–12	8–8 (T-4th)	WAC Quarterfinals	Gordy Presnell
2010–11	12–19	3–13 (8th)	WAC First Round	Gordy Presnell
2011–12	15–16	5–9 (6th)	MWC Semifinals	Gordy Presnell
2012–13	11–19	4–12 (7th)	MWC Quarterfinals	Gordy Presnell
2013–14	18–14	12–6 (T-3rd)	MWC Quarterfinals; WBI Second Round	Gordy Presnell
2014–15	22–11	11–7	Mountain West Tournament Champions; NCAA First Round	Gordy Presnell
2015–16	19–11	12–6	Mountain West Quarterfinals	Gordy Presnell
2016–17	25–8	12–6	Mountain West Tournament Champions; NCAA First Round	Gordy Presnell
2017–18	23–10	14–4	Mountain West Tournament Champions; NCAA First Round	Gordy Presnell
2018–19	28–5	16–2	Mountain West Tournament Champions; NCAA First Round	Gordy Presnell
2019–20	24–9	13–5	Mountain West Tournament Champions	Gordy Presnell
2020–21	14–9	10–8	Mountain West Semifinals	Gordy Presnell
2021–22	8–21	4–13	Mountain West First Round	Gordy Presnell
2022–23	17–16	11–7	Mountain West Quarterfinals	Gordy Presnell
2023–24	21–14	10–8	Mountain West Semifinals; WNIT First Round	Gordy Presnell
2024–25	18–15	7–11	Mountain West Quarterfinals	Gordy Presnell

== Postseason results ==
=== NCAA Division I ===
Year	Seed	Round	Opponent	Result
1994	#9	First Round	#8 Washington	L 61–89
2007	#12	First Round	#5 George Washington	L 67–76
2015	#15	First Round	#2 Tennessee	L 61–72
2017	#13	First Round	#4 UCLA	L 56–83
2018	#16	First Round	#1 Louisville	L 42–74
2019	#13	First Round	#4 Oregon State	L 75–80 ^{OT}

=== AIAW Division I ===
The Broncos made one appearance in the AIAW National Division I basketball tournament, with a combined record of 0–2.

Year	Round	Opponent	Result
1975	First Round; Consolation First Round	Wayland Baptist; Kansas State	L, 37–93; L, 37–65
