= Wyoming Cowgirls basketball =

Women's college basketball team

2026–27 Wyoming Cowgirls basketball team
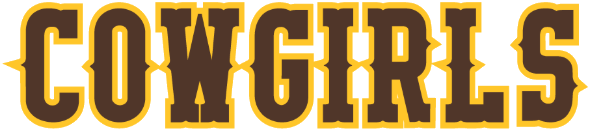
- University: University of Wyoming
- Head coach: Heather Ezell (5th season)
- Location: Laramie, Wyoming
- Arena: Arena-Auditorium (capacity: 11,612)
- Conference: Mountain West
- Nickname: Cowgirls
- Colors: Brown and gold

NCAA Division I tournament appearances
- 2008, 2021

Conference tournament champions
- 2021

Conference regular-season champions
- 1990

Uniforms
Home	Away

The Wyoming Cowgirls basketball team is the official women's college basketball team held at the University of Wyoming in Laramie, Wyoming. They are currently competing in the Mountain West Conference, the organization has a tradition dating back to 1973.

== History ==
The program began in 1973, with Bonnie Hulstrand as head coach. Following Hulstrand's leaving for the Idaho Vandals, Margie Hunt McDonald led the team for 9 seasons, finishing her coaching career with over 100 wins and a winning record at Wyoming. When McDonald left coaching to become the executive director of the High Country Athletic Conference, Dan Richards coached the team for three seasons. Chad Lavin was hired as head coach in 1986 and coached the Cowgirls for 12 seasons, including the 1989–90 season, in which the Cowgirls won their only conference regular season title. In 1998, Cheyenne, Wyoming native Cindy Fisher was hired as the head coach of the Cowgirls, and coached the team for five seasons, including the 2003 season, in which the Cowgirls appeared in the WNIT for the first time. In 2003, Fisher resigned her position, citing personal reasons.

On May 1, 2003, Wyoming announced the hiring of Utah assistant Joe Legerski as head coach. At the end of his first season, Legerski won the Mountain West Conference coach of the year award after leading a team with 7 freshman and 10 underclassman to a 5th place finish in the conference. In 2006, the Cowgirls achieved both the second 20–win season in the program's history and the program's second appearance in the WNIT. The next season, the team continued to improve, again winning over 20 games and making the WNIT tournament for 2007. The Cowgirls made it to the championship game and defeated Wisconsin 72–56 to win the tournament in front of a record crowd of 15,462 in the Arena-Auditorium. The 27 wins recorded by the 2006–07 team remain a program record. The Cowgirls continued to see improving results, finishing 24–7 and earning the program's first berth into the NCAA tournament, although the team lost in the first round to Pittsburgh. Over the next 11 seasons, the Cowgirls recorded 7 more 20–win seasons and 6 more appearances in the WNIT. At the conclusion of the 2018–19 season, Joe Legerski announced he was retiring as head coach after 16 years. Legerski won Mountain West conference coach of the year three times (2003–04, 2016–17, 2017–18) and retired as the program's winningest coach with a record of 314–186 (.628).

On May 7, 2019, longtime Cowgirl assistant Gerald Mattinson was named the seventh head coach in program history. In Mattinson's first season as the head coach, the Cowgirls went 17–12, and reached the semifinals of the Mountain West tournament. In Mattinson's second season, the Cowgirls went 14–10, but won the Mountain West tournament, the first in program history. The Cowgirls lost to UCLA in the Round of 64 of the NCAA tournament.

== Coaching records ==
Tenure	Coach	Seasons	Record	Win Pct.
1973–1974	Bonnie Hulstrand	1	11–4	.733
1974–1983	Margie McDonald	9	123–114	.519
1983–1986	Dan Richards	3	23–60	.277
1986–1998	Chad Lavin	12	175–161	.521
1998–2003	Cindy Fisher	5	59–81	.421
2003–2019	Joe Legerski	16	314–186	.628
2019–2022	Gerald Mattinson	3	48–35	.578
2022–present	Heather Ezell	3	63-38	.624
Totals	8 coaches	52 seasons	816-679	.546

== Postseason ==
=== NCAA tournament ===
The Cowgirls have appeared in the NCAA tournament two times. Their record is 0–2.

Year	Seed	Round	Opponent	Result/Score
2008	11	First round	(6) Pittsburgh	L 58–63
2021	14	First round	(3) #9 UCLA	L 48–69

=== WNIT ===
The Cowgirls have appeared in the WNIT 12 times. Their combined record is 22–11. They won the tournament in 2007.

Year	Round	Opponent	Result/Score
2003	First round Second round	Montana; Colorado State	W 76–74 ^{OT} L 64–73
2006	Second round Third round	Oregon State; Nebraska	W 67–49; L 67–72
2007	First round Second round Third round Quarterfinal; Semifinal; Championship	Nevada; Missouri; Oregon; South Dakota State; Kansas State; Wisconsin	W 84–56; W 73–67; W 64–62; W 70–59; W 89–79 ^{3OT} W 72–56
2010	First round Second round Third round	Nevada; Texas Tech; BYU	W 74–53; W 68–57 ^{OT} L 63–67
2011	First round Second round Third round	Portland State; Oklahoma State; Colorado	W 79–44; W 75–71; L 58–70
2013	First round	Northern Colorado	L 63–71
2017	First round Second round	Seattle; Washington State	W 68–52; L 68–67 ^{OT}
2018	First round Second round	New Mexico State; U.C. Davis	W 67–59; L 72–64
2019	First round Second round Third round Quarterfinal	Northern Colorado; South Alabama; Pepperdine; Arizona	W 68–60; W 78–71; W 61–60; L 47–67
2022	First round Second round Third round	Idaho State; Tulsa; UCLA	W 76–73^{OT} W 97–90^{3OT} L 81–82^{3OT}
2023	First round Second round	Texas A&M–Corpus Christi; Kansas State	W 75–41; L 55-71
2024	Second round Super 16; Great 8	UTSA; South Dakota; Minnesota	W 80–64; W 84–52; L 54–65

=== NWIT ===
The Cowgirls appeared in the NWIT 1 time. Their record is 0–3.

Year	Opponent	Result/Score
1990	Toledo; Fresno State; Maine	L 58–75; L 63–67; L 48–68

== Team records ==
As of 2022–23 season

=== Career leaders ===
Career Scoring Leaders
Seasons	Player	Points
1985–89	Christine Fairless	1933
1984–87	Michele Hoppes	1842
1992–95	Amy Burnett	1782
2012–15	Kayla Woodward	1769
2005–08	Hanna Zavecz	1746
1999–2003	Carrie Bacon	1692
2007–11	Aubrey Vandiver	1654
1980–83	Rita Makovicka	1578
1989–92	Marie Kauffman	1526
1979–82	Lori Kline	1521

Career Rebounding Leaders
Seasons	Player	Rebounds
1984–87	Michele Hoppes	1104
1980–83	Rita Makovicka	1006
1979–82	Lori Kline	947
2007–11	Aubrey Vandiver	936
1976–79	Linda Gilpin	890
1989–92	Marie Kauffman	872
1992–95	Amy Burnett	829
2012–15	Kayla Woodward	812
2010–13	Chaundra Sewell	785
1977–79	Dale Ann Meeker	770

Career Assists Leaders
Seasons	Player	Assists
1985–88	Lisa Daniels	573
2013–16	Marquelle Dent	514
2005–08	Hanna Zavecz	432
1991–94	Anna Knight	396
2017–19	Clara Tapia	394
2001–04	Brenda Pickup	391
2018–23	Tommi Olson	375
1983–86	Jenny Przekwas	374
1988–90	Mickey Alexander	352
2002–05	Ashley Elliott	330

Career Blocks Leaders
Seasons	Player	Blocks
1979–82	Lori Kline	322
2008–11	Hillary Carlson	212
2005–08	Hanna Zavecz	162
1984–87	Michele Hoppes	134
1994–97	Jessica Thompson	117
2021-present	Allyson Fertig	97
2006–09	Rebecca Vanderjagt	94
2010–13	Chaundra Sewell	81
1987–91	Yvette Plumlee	79
2009–13	Ashley Sickles	77

Career Steals Leaders
Seasons	Player	Steals
1985–88	Lisa Daniels	279
2005–08	Hanna Zavecz	226
2001–04	Brenda Pickup	209
2002–05	Ashley Elliott	187
1987–91	Yvette Plumlee	187
2013–16	Marquelle Dent	181
2018–23	Tommi Olson	172
1999–2003	Carrie Bacon	169
2007–11	Aubrey Vandiver	156
1983–86	Jenny Przkewas	155

Career Games played Leaders
Seasons	Player	Games
2018–23	Quinn Weidemann	149
2007–11	Aubrey Vandiver	133
2018–23	Tommi Olson	128
2017–20	Taylor Rusk	128
2016–19	Marta Gomez	128
2005–08	Dominique Sisk	125
2006–09	Megan McGuffey	125
2005–08	Hanna Zavecz	124
2005–08	Jodi Bolerjack	124
2010–13	Chaundra Sewell	124

=== Single-season leaders ===
Single–Season Scoring Leaders
Season	Player	Points
2010–11	Aubrey Vandiver	625
1994–95	Amy Burnett	614
2010–11	Hillary Carlson	572
1993–94	Amy Burnett	568
1986–87	Michele Hoppes	566
1988–89	Christine Fairless	551
2014–15	Marquelle Dent	531
2018–19	Marta Gomez	530
1987–88	Christine Fairless	523
2013–14	Kayla Woodward	519

Single–Season Rebounding Leaders
Season	Player	Rebounds
2009–10	Aubrey Vandiver	323
2012–13	Chaundra Sewell	310
2013–14	Fallon Lewis	305
2010–11	Aubrey Vandiver	303
1984–85	Michele Hoppes	298
2022–23	Allyson Fertig	296
2018–19	Bailee Cotton	293
1993–94	Amy Burnett	286
1981–82	Rita Makovicka	285
1979–80	Sue Owens	281

Single–Season Assists Leaders
Season	Player	Assists
1986–87	Lisa Daniels	249
1991–92	Valerie Harrison	195
1989–90	Mickey Alexander	190
2014–15	Marquelle Dent	180
1985–86	Jenny Przekwas	163
1988–89	Mickey Alexander	162
2015–16	Marquelle Dent	161
1984–85	Jenny Przekwas	157
1987–88	Lisa Daniels	156
2016–17	Clara Tapia	145

Single–Season Blocks Leaders
Season	Player	Blocks
2009–10	Hillary Carlson	98
1981–82	Lori Kline	93
1980–81	Lori Kline	85
1982–83	Lori Kline	80
2010–11	Hillary Carlson	73
2022–23	Allyson Fertig	69
1979–80	Lori Kline	64
2007–08	Hanna Zavecz	51
2006–07	Hanna Zavecz	49
1994–95	Jessica Thompson	45

Single–Season Steals Leaders
Season	Player	Steals
2000–01	Jessica Gibbs	78
2003–04	Brenda Pickup	75
1984–85	Jenny Przekwas	75
2004–05	Ashley Elliott	74
2005–06	Hanna Zavecz	69
1989–90	Yvette Plumlee	68
1982–83	Kristy Bennett	68
1979–80	Sara St. Clair	68
1979–80	Kellie Cardona	67
1981–82	Kristy Bennett	66
2014–15	Marquelle Dent	66
