= 2018–19 Colorado State Rams women's basketball team =

Intercollegiate basketball season

2018–19 Colorado State Rams women's basketball
- Conference: Mountain West Conference
- Record: 8–22 (2–16 Mountain West)
- Head coach: Ryun Williams (7th season)
- Assistant coaches: Rico Burkett; Kellie Lewis; Amber Cunningham
- Home arena: Moby Arena

2018–19 Mountain West Conference women's basketball standings
	Conf.				Overall
Team	W		L	PCT	W		L	PCT
Boise State †	16	–	2	.889	28	–	5	.848
New Mexico	14	–	4	.778	24	–	7	.774
Wyoming	13	–	5	.722	25	–	9	.735
Fresno State	11	–	7	.611	19	–	13	.594
Utah State	10	–	8	.556	17	–	15	.531
UNLV	10	–	8	.556	12	–	18	.400
Nevada	7	–	11	.389	12	–	19	.387
San Diego State	7	–	11	.389	14	–	18	.438
San Jose State	5	–	13	.278	6	–	24	.200
Air Force	4	–	14	.222	8	–	22	.267
Colorado State	2	–	16	.111	8	–	22	.267
† 2019 MW tournament winner Rankings from AP poll

The 2018–19 Colorado State Rams women's basketball team represented Colorado State University in the 2018–19 NCAA Division I women's basketball season. The Rams, led by seventh year head coach Ryun Williams, played their home games at Moby Arena, and were members of the Mountain West Conference. They finished the season 8–22, 2–16 in Mountain West play to finish in last place. They lost in the first round of the Mountain West Conference women's basketball tournament to Utah State.

== Roster ==
2018–19 Colorado State Rams women's basketball team
Players
Coaches

Pos.	#	Name	Height	Year	Previous school	Hometown
G/F	0	Taylor Mole	6 ft 2 in (1.88 m)	Fr	Australian Institute of Sport	Hobart, Australia
G	2	Tori Williams (redshirt)	5 ft 9 in (1.75 m)	So	Centennial HS; Utah	Boise, ID
G/F	3	Megan Jacobs (redshirt)	6 ft 1 in (1.85 m)	Jr	Bishop Gorman HS; Utah	Las Vegas, NV
G	4	Roichelle Marble	5 ft 7 in (1.7 m)	RS Sr	East HS; Wisconsin	Des Moines, IA
C	11	Lena Svanholm	6 ft 6 in (1.98 m)	So	Horsholm	Horsholm, Denmark
G/F	12	Jamie Bonnarens (redshirt)	6 ft 0 in (1.83 m)	Jr	Cache HS; Cameron	Cache, OK
G/F	21	Myanne Hamm	5 ft 11 in (1.8 m)	RS Sr	Poudre HS	Fort Collins, CO
G/F	22	Lauren Brocke	6 ft 3 in (1.91 m)	RS Fr	Centennial HS	Boise, ID
G	23	Grace Colaivalu	5 ft 7 in (1.7 m)	RS So	Rosemont HS	Sacramento, CA
G	24	Mollie Mounsey	5 ft 10 in (1.78 m)	Jr	Follett HS; Seward County CC	Follett, TX
F	32	Andrea Brady	6 ft 1 in (1.85 m)	Sr	Cottonwood HS; Salt Lake CC	Salt Lake City, UT
F	34	Liah Davis	6 ft 2 in (1.88 m)	RS So	Sand Creek	Colorado Springs, CO
F	35	Lore Devos	6 ft 0 in (1.83 m)	So	Stedelijk	Kortrijk, Belgium
F	44	Tatum Neubert	6 ft 2 in (1.88 m)	RS Sr	Elizabeth; LSU	Elizabeth, CO

Head coach

- Ryun Williams (South Dakota)

Assistant coach(es)

- Rico Burkett (North Dakota)
- Kellie Lewis (Boise State)
- Amber Cunningham (South Dakota)

Legend

- (C) Team captain
- (S) Suspended
- (I) Ineligible
- (W) Walk-on
- Injured
- Current redshirt

Roster

== Schedule ==
Date time, TV	Rank^{#}	Opponent^{#}	Result	Record	Site (attendance) city, state
Exhibition
Nov 1, 2018*; 7:00 pm		South Dakota Mines	W 77–55		Moby Arena; Fort Collins, CO
Nov 2, 2018*; 7:00 pm		Colorado Christian	W 73–60		Moby Arena; Fort Collins, CO
Non-conference regular season
Nov 6, 2018*; 7:00 pm		Eastern New Mexico	W 72–46	1–0	Moby Arena (881); Fort Collins, CO
Nov 14, 2018*; 7:00 pm		at Colorado	L 40–59	1–1	CU Events Center (1,394); Boulder, CO
Nov 20, 2018*; 7:00 pm		Northern Colorado	L 47–53	1–2	Moby Arena (1,145); Fort Collins, CO
Nov 25, 2018*; 12:00 pm		Cornell	W 56–53	2–2	Moby Arena (1,401); Fort Collins, CO
Nov 28, 2018*; 7:00 pm		at Gonzaga	L 39–50	2–3	McCarthey Athletic Center (5,065); Spokane, WA
Dec 2, 2018*; 12:00 pm		North Florida	W 61–59	3–3	Moby Arena (941); Fort Collins, CO
Dec 5, 2018*; 11:30 am		Northern Arizona	W 65–54	4–3	Moby Arena (2,434); Fort Collins, CO
Dec 9, 2018*; 2:00 pm, Stadium		No. 17 Arizona State	L 39–70	4–4	Moby Arena (1,120); Fort Collins, CO
Dec 15, 2018*; 2:00 pm, BYUtv		at BYU	L 42–51	4–5	Marriott Center (500); Provo, UT
Dec 21, 2018*; 12:00 pm		Denver	W 84–79	5–5	Moby Arena (1,069); Fort Collins, CO
Dec 29, 2018*; 2:00 pm		Chadron State	W 91–38	6–5	Moby Arena (1,187); Fort Collins, CO
Mountain West regular season
Jan 2, 2019; 7:00 pm		UNLV	W 52–49	7–5 (1–0)	Moby Arena (987); Fort Collins, CO
Jan 5, 2019; 2:00 pm		Fresno State	L 55–66	7–6 (1–1)	Moby Arena (1,235); Fort Collins, CO
Jan 9, 2019; 7:00 pm		at Air Force	L 48–63	7–7 (1–2)	Clune Arena (462); Colorado Springs, CO
Jan 12, 2019; 2:00 pm		at New Mexico	L 58–70	7–8 (1–3)	Dreamstyle Arena (5,809); Albuquerque, NM
Jan 19, 2019; 2:00 pm		Utah State	L 53–72	7–9 (1–4)	Moby Arena (1,270); Fort Collins, CO
Jan 23, 2019; 7:00 pm		Nevada	L 38–62	7–10 (1–5)	Moby Arena (955); Fort Collins, CO
Jan 26, 2019; 3:00 pm		at Fresno State	L 54–57	7–11 (1–6)	Save Mart Center (2,187); Fresno, CA
Jan 30, 2019; 7:00 pm		at Boise State	L 57–70	7–12 (1–7)	Taco Bell Arena (1,181); Boise, ID
Feb 2, 2019; 2:00 pm		Air Force	W 55–48	8–12 (2–7)	Moby Arena (1,436); Fort Collins, CO
Feb 6, 2019; 7:30 pm		at Nevada	L 57–68	8–13 (2–8)	Lawlor Events Center (1,125); Reno, NV
Feb 9, 2019; 2:00 pm		Wyoming; Border War	L 49–60	8–14 (2–9)	Moby Arena (1,807); Fort Collins, CO
Feb 13, 2019; 7:30 pm		at San Diego State	L 45–54	8–15 (2–10)	Viejas Arena (409); San Diego, CA
Feb 20, 2019; 7:00 pm		San Jose State	L 70–78	8–16 (2–11)	Moby Arena (1,031); Fort Collins, CO
Feb 23, 2019; 2:00 pm		at Wyoming; Border War	L 32–56	8–17 (2–12)	Arena-Auditorium (4,361); Laramie, WY
Feb 27, 2019; 7:00 pm		Boise State	L 63–72 ^{OT}	8–18 (2–13)	Moby Arena (1,110); Fort Collins, CO
Mar 2, 2019; 2:00 pm		New Mexico	L 56–79	8–19 (2–14)	Moby Arena (1,531); Fort Collins, CO
Mar 4, 2019; 7:00 pm		at Utah State	L 59–70	8–20 (2–15)	Smith Spectrum (656); Logan, UT
Mar 7, 2019; 7:00 pm		at UNLV	L 45–60	8–21 (2–16)	Cox Pavilion (1,402); Paradise, NV
Mountain West Women's Tournament
Mar 10, 2019; 8:00 pm, Stadium	(11)	vs. (6) Utah State; First Round	L 59–62	8–22	Thomas & Mack Center (1,550); Paradise, NV
*Non-conference game. ^{#}Rankings from AP Poll. (#) Tournament seedings in parentheses. All times are in Mountain Time.

== See also ==
- 2018–19 Colorado State Rams men's basketball team
