= 2018–19 Wyoming Cowgirls basketball team =

Intercollegiate basketball season

2018–19 Wyoming Cowgirls basketball

WNIT, quarterfinals
- Conference: Mountain West Conference
- Record: 25–9 (13–5 Mountain West)
- Head coach: Joe Legerski (16th season)
- Assistant coaches: Gerald Mattinson; Bojan Janković; Heather Ezell
- Home arena: Arena-Auditorium

2018–19 Mountain West Conference women's basketball standings
	Conf.				Overall
Team	W		L	PCT	W		L	PCT
Boise State †	16	–	2	.889	28	–	5	.848
New Mexico	14	–	4	.778	24	–	7	.774
Wyoming	13	–	5	.722	25	–	9	.735
Fresno State	11	–	7	.611	19	–	13	.594
Utah State	10	–	8	.556	17	–	15	.531
UNLV	10	–	8	.556	12	–	18	.400
Nevada	7	–	11	.389	12	–	19	.387
San Diego State	7	–	11	.389	14	–	18	.438
San Jose State	5	–	13	.278	6	–	24	.200
Air Force	4	–	14	.222	8	–	22	.267
Colorado State	2	–	16	.111	8	–	22	.267
† 2019 MW tournament winner Rankings from AP poll

The 2018–19 Wyoming Cowgirls basketball team represented the University of Wyoming in the 2018–19 NCAA Division I women's basketball season. The Cowgirls were led by head coach Joe Legerski in his 16th and final season. They played their home games at the Arena-Auditorium in Laramie, Wyoming and were members of the Mountain West Conference. They finished the season 25–9, 13–5 in Mountain West play, to finish in third place. They advanced to the championship game of the Mountain West tournament, where they lost to Boise State. They received an at-large bid to the WNIT, where they defeated Northern Colorado, South Alabama and Pepperdine in the first, second and third rounds, before losing to Arizona in the quarterfinals.

== Roster ==
2018–19 Wyoming Cowgirls women's basketball team
Players
Coaches

Pos.	#	Name	Height	Year	Previous school	Hometown
F	1	Karla Erjavec	5 ft 10 in (1.78 m)	Fr	Sport Gymnasium	Zagreb, Croatia
F	2	Tereza Vitulova	6 ft 2 in (1.88 m)	Fr	Sportovni Gymnazium L Danka	Domašov, Czech Republic
G	3	Elisa Pilli	5 ft 7 in (1.7 m)	RS Jr	Liceo Scientifico Parini	Padova, Italy
F	4	Taylor Rusk	5 ft 11 in (1.8 m)	Jr	ThunderRidge HS	Highlands Ranch, CO
F	5	Sladjana Rakovic	6 ft 0 in (1.83 m)	Sr	Western Nebraska; Prva Tehnicka Skola HS	Bijelo Polje, Montenegro
F	10	Selale Kepenc (injured)	6 ft 2 in (1.88 m)	Jr	Bostenci Doga College	Istanbul, Turkey
G	11	Alba Sanchez Ramos	6 ft 0 in (1.83 m)	Fr	Colegio Torrevilano	Madrid, Spain
F	12	Marta Gomez	6 ft 1 in (1.85 m)	Sr	INS Joaquim Blume	Valles, Spain
G	14	Quinn Weidemann	5 ft 9 in (1.75 m)	Fr	Westside HS	Omaha, NE
G	22	Clara Tapia	5 ft 7 in (1.7 m)	Sr	Universitat Pompeu Fabra	Barcelona, Spain
F	23	Bailee Cotton	6 ft 2 in (1.88 m)	RS Sr	Denver School of Science and Technology	Denver, CO
G	24	Tommi Olson	5 ft 6 in (1.68 m)	Fr	Highlands Ranch HS	Worland, WY
F	32	Tijana Raca	6 ft 0 in (1.83 m)	Sr	Aristoteleio College	Pyles, Greece
F	40	Coreen Labish	6 ft 2 in (1.88 m)	RS Jr	Mead HS	Cheney, WA
F	44	Rachelle Tucker	6 ft 2 in (1.88 m)	Sr	Pierce HS	Pierce, NE

Head coach

- Joe Legerski (Wyoming)

Assistant coach(es)

- Gerald Mattinson (Weber State)
- Bojan Janković (Ozarks)
- Heather Ezell (Iowa State)

Legend

- (C) Team captain
- (S) Suspended
- (I) Ineligible
- (W) Walk-on
- Injured
- Current redshirt

Roster
Last update: September 12, 2024

== Statistics ==
Player	GP	GS	MPG	FG%	3FG%	FT%	RPG	APG	BPG	SPG	PPG
Bailee Cotton	34	34	29.1	.444	.300	.761	8.6	1.6	1.1	1.4	11.6
Karla Erjavec	34	34	31.6	.394	.333	.761	2.6	3.6	0.2	0.8	8.9
Marta Gomez	34	34	30.6	.523	.474	.927	4.7	1.1	0.3	1.0	15.6
Tommi Olson	11	0	6.1	.143	.000	.500	0.6	0.9	0.0	1.1	0.3
Elisa Pilli	8	0	5.9	.500	.750	.667	0.5	0.4	0.0	0.4	1.9
Tijana Raca	12	0	5.1	.357	.375	.000	0.7	0.6	0.0	0.3	1.1
Sladjana Rakovic	25	0	13.5	.581	.556	.750	4.2	0.9	0.0	0.5	5.5
Taylor Rusk	34	34	32.7	.438	.323	.656	3.4	3.2	0.2	0.9	9.1
Alba Sanchez Ramos	7	0	7.9	.522	.467	.800	0.4	0.4	0.1	0.4	5.0
Clara Tapia	34	34	26.9	.366	.238	.592	2.0	3.1	0.1	0.8	3.9
Rachelle Tucker	21	0	6.4	.551	.000	.867	1.9	0.1	0.1	0.4	3.2
Tereza Vitulova	27	0	8.7	.491	.357	.773	2.0	0.1	0.3	0.1	4.7
Quinn Weidemann	34	0	23.0	.405	.426	.760	1.5	1.3	0.1	0.5	6.6

== Schedule ==
Date time, TV	Rank^{#}	Opponent^{#}	Result	Record	Site (attendance) city, state
Exhibition
November 2, 2018*; 6:30 p.m.		Western State Colorado	W 64–28	0–0	Arena-Auditorium (2,058); Laramie, WY
Non-conference regular season
November 7, 2018*; 6:30 p.m.		Chadron State	W 80–33	1–0	Arena-Auditorium (2,119); Laramie, WY
November 9, 2018*; 7:00 p.m.		at Saint Mary's	L 84–90	1–1	McKeon Pavilion (482); Moraga, CA
November 13, 2018*; 6:30 p.m.		UC Colorado Springs	W 98–37	2–1	Arena-Auditorium (2,062); Laramie, WY
November 23, 2018*; 1:30 p.m.		vs. North Texas; Tiger Turkey Tip-Off	W 53–49	3–1	Alex G. Spanos Center (132); Stockton, CA
November 24, 2018*; 4:00 p.m.		at Pacific; Tiger Turkey Tip-Off	L 64–70	3–2	Alex G. Spanos Center (325); Stockton, CA
November 27, 2018*; 6:30 p.m.		Montana State	W 66–58	4–2	Arena-Auditorium (2,381); Laramie, WY
December 4, 2018*; 6:30 p.m.		Denver	W 78–74	5–2	Arena-Auditorium (2,374); Laramie, WY
December 8, 2018*; 1:00 p.m.		Idaho	W 64–61	6–2	Arena-Auditorium (2,551); Laramie, WY
December 20, 2018*; 6:30 p.m.		South Dakota State	W 77–70	7–2	Arena-Auditorium (2,837); Laramie, WY
Mountain West regular season
January 2, 2019; 7:00 p.m.		at Boise State	L 64–72	7–3 (0–1)	Taco Bell Arena (1,097); Boise, ID
January 5, 2019; 2:00 p.m.		UNLV	W 90–62	8–3 (1–1)	Arena-Auditorium (3,879); Laramie, WY
January 9, 2019; 6:30 p.m.		San Diego State	W 87–45	9–3 (2–1)	Arena-Auditorium (2,290); Laramie, WY
January 12, 2019; 2:00 p.m.		at Utah State	L 42–50	9–4 (2–2)	Smith Spectrum (265); Logan, UT
January 19, 2019; 2:00 p.m.		New Mexico	L 75–78	9–5 (2–3)	Arena-Auditorium (2,590); Laramie, WY
January 23, 2019; 8:00 p.m.		at San Jose State	W 70–56	10–5 (3–3)	Event Center Arena (418); San Jose, CA
January 26, 2019; 2:00 p.m.		Boise State	W 64–52	11–5 (4–3)	Arena-Auditorium (3,621); Laramie, WY
January 30, 2019; 8:00 p.m.		at Fresno State	W 63–56	12–5 (5–3)	Save Mart Center (1,994); Fresno, CA
February 6, 2019; 6:30 p.m.		Air Force	W 80–60	13–5 (6–3)	Arena-Auditorium (2,460); Laramie, WY
February 9, 2019; 2:00 p.m.		at Colorado State; Border War	W 60–49	14–5 (7–3)	Moby Arena (1,807); Fort Collins, CO
February 13, 2019; 6:30 p.m.		Utah State	W 53–35	15–5 (8–3)	Arena-Auditorium (2,400); Laramie, WY
February 16, 2019; 3:00 p.m.		at Nevada	W 55–51	16–5 (9–3)	Lawlor Events Center (2,371); Reno, NV
February 20, 2019; 7:00 p.m.		at UNLV	W 64–49	17–5 (10–3)	Cox Pavilion (782); Paradise, NV
February 23, 2019; 2:00 p.m.		Colorado State; Border War	W 56–32	18–5 (11–3)	Arena-Auditorium (4,361); Laramie, WY
February 27, 2019; 6:30 p.m.		Fresno State	L 64–66	18–6 (11–4)	Arena-Auditorium (2,560); Laramie, WY
March 2, 2019; 2:00 p.m.		at Air Force	W 59–56 ^{OT}	19–6 (12–4)	Clune Arena (742); Colorado Springs, CO
March 4, 2019; 6:30 p.m.		San Jose State	W 85–56	20–6 (13–4)	Arena-Auditorium (2,932); Laramie, WY
March 7, 2019; 7:00 p.m.		at New Mexico	L 50–57	20–7 (13–5)	The Pit (8,152); Albuquerque, NM
Mountain West women's tournament
March 11, 2019; 9:30 p.m., Stadium	(3)	vs. (6) Utah State; Quarterfinals	W 64–41	21–7	Thomas & Mack Center (2,231); Paradise, NV
March 12, 2019; 9:30 p.m., Stadium	(3)	vs. (7) San Diego State; Semifinals	W 75–70 ^{OT}	22–7	Thomas & Mack Center (1,934); Paradise, NV
March 13, 2019; 8:00 p.m., CBSSN	(3)	vs. (1) Boise State; Championship game	L 51–68	22–8	Thomas & Mack Center (2,011); Paradise, NV
WNIT
March 21, 2019*; 6:30 p.m.		Northern Colorado; First round	W 68–60	23–8	Arena-Auditorium (2,685); Laramie, WY
March 24, 2019*; 2:00 p.m.		South Alabama; Second round	W 78–71	24–8	Arena-Auditorium (3,405); Laramie, WY
March 28, 2019*; 6:30 p.m.		Pepperdine; Third round	W 61–60	25–8	Arena-Auditorium (5,134); Laramie, WY
March 31, 2019*; 2:00 p.m.		at Arizona; Quarterfinals	L 45–67	25–9	McKale Center (7,717); Tucson, AZ
*Non-conference game. ^{#}Rankings from AP poll. (#) Tournament seedings in parentheses. All times are in Mountain.

== See also ==
- 2018–19 Wyoming Cowboys basketball team
