= Bourgeois party =

German political party description

"Bourgeois party" (German: bürgerliche Partei) or "bourgeois camp" (German: bürgerliche Lager) is a political term used in Europe, which can refer to a conservative or right-leaning liberal party, and is in contrast to the socialistic "left-wing camp" (German: linken Lager). The term is mainly used when the main left-leaning forces are social democrats and socialists, and the main right-leaning forces against them are liberals and conservatives; it is rarely used when the main left-leaning forces include liberals. In the political landscape of the Germanic language region, traditional bourgeois parties are as follows:

- Germany: Christian Democratic Union of Germany, Christian Social Union in Bavaria, Free Democratic Party
- Austria: Austrian People's Party, NEOS – The New Austria and Liberal Forum
- Switzerland: FDP.The Liberals, Swiss People's Party, The Centre

Parties that adopted term in their name include:

- Switzerland: Bourgeois Party of Switzerland (German: Bürgerlich-Demokratische Partei Schweiz)
- Austria: Bourgeois Democrats (German: Bürgerliche Demokraten)
- Denmark: New Bourgeois (Danish: Nye Borgerlige), Bourgeois Alternative (Danish: Borgerligt Alternativ), Bourgeois Centre (Danish: Borgerligt Centrum)

== In Germany ==
In the German-speaking media, conservative and right-liberal as well as liberal-conservative parties abroad are often referred to as "bourgeois parties" (bürgerliche Parteien). In the mid-1980s, Heiner Geißler, then secretary-general of the CDU, introduced the camp theory to the West Germany. Within the newly formed four-party system, Geißler described the center-right parties CDU/CSU, and FDP as the bourgeois camp, and the SPD and Greens as the "left-wing camp". In Germany, the opposite expression of "left-wing camp" is preferred as "bourgeois party" rather than "right-wing camp" in order to exclude far-right politics from the mainstream right-leaning forces. The Alternative for Germany (AfD), a far-right political party founded in 2013, calls itself a "bourgeois [party]", which is criticized and generally unacceptable.

== See also ==
- Bürgerblock-Regierung
- Centre-right politics
- Conservatism in Germany
- Liberalism in Germany
- List of major liberal parties considered right
