= 2018–19 Boise State Broncos women's basketball team =

American college basketball season

2018–19 Boise State Broncos women's basketball

Husky Classic Champions Mountain West regular season and tournament champions

NCAA Women's Tournament, first round
- Conference: Mountain West Conference
- Record: 28–5 (16–2 MWC)
- Head coach: Gordy Presnell (14th season)
- Assistant coaches: Cody Butler; Heather Sower; Cariann Ramirez
- Home arena: Taco Bell Arena

2018–19 Mountain West Conference women's basketball standings
	Conf.				Overall
Team	W		L	PCT	W		L	PCT
Boise State †	16	–	2	.889	28	–	5	.848
New Mexico	14	–	4	.778	24	–	7	.774
Wyoming	13	–	5	.722	25	–	9	.735
Fresno State	11	–	7	.611	19	–	13	.594
Utah State	10	–	8	.556	17	–	15	.531
UNLV	10	–	8	.556	12	–	18	.400
Nevada	7	–	11	.389	12	–	19	.387
San Diego State	7	–	11	.389	14	–	18	.438
San Jose State	5	–	13	.278	6	–	24	.200
Air Force	4	–	14	.222	8	–	22	.267
Colorado State	2	–	16	.111	8	–	22	.267
† 2019 MW tournament winner Rankings from AP poll

The 2018–19 Boise State Broncos women's basketball team represented Boise State University during the 2018–19 NCAA Division I women's basketball season. The Broncos, led by 14th-year head coach Gordy Presnell, played their home games at Taco Bell Arena as a member of the Mountain West Conference. They finished the season 28–5, 14–4 in Mountain West play to win the Mountain West regular season title. Boise State won the 2019 Air Force Reserve Mountain West Women’s Basketball Championship, which earned them the automatic bid to the NCAA tournament. They lost in the first round to Oregon State in overtime. With 28 wins, they finish with the most wins in the regular season in school history.

== Roster ==
2018–19 Boise State Broncos women's basketball team
Players
Coaches

Pos.	#	Name	Height	Year	Previous school	Hometown
F	3	Sofia Galeron	6 ft 2 in (1.88 m)	RS Fr		Burgos, Spain
G	14	Braydey Hodgins	5 ft 8 in (1.73 m)	Jr	Chiawana HS	Pasco, WA
F	15	Tess Amundsen	6 ft 1 in (1.85 m)	So	Clovis West HS	Fresno, CA
G	20	Marta Hermida	5 ft 11 in (1.8 m)	Sr	Margarita Salas HS	Madrid, Spain
G	21	Riley Lupfer	5 ft 9 in (1.75 m)	Jr	Lewis and Clark HS	Spokane, WA
G/F	22	Ellie Woerner	6 ft 0 in (1.83 m)	RS Jr	Eastlake HS; Portland	Sammamish, WA
G	23	Jayde Christopher	5 ft 8 in (1.73 m)	RS Jr	Cleveland HS; Kansas	Federal Way, WA
F	25	Rachel Bowers	6 ft 3 in (1.91 m)	Fr	Canyon HS	Santa Clarita, CA
G	30	Jade Loville	5 ft 10 in (1.78 m)	Fr	Skyline HS	Sammamish, WA
C	31	Marijke Vanderschaaf	6 ft 3 in (1.91 m)	RS Sr	Eastlake HS	Sammamish, WA
F	32	Mallory McGwire (redshirt)	6 ft 5 in (1.96 m)	Jr	Reno HS; Oregon	Reno, NV
F	33	Joyce Harrell	6 ft 0 in (1.83 m)	Sr	Cleveland HS	Seattle, WA
G	35	Maggie Freeman	5 ft 11 in (1.8 m)	Fr	Southridge HS	Beaverton, OR
F	42	A'Shanti Coleman	6 ft 2 in (1.88 m)	RS Jr	Sacred Heart Cathedral Prep; Arizona	San Francisco, CA
F	44	Emerald Toth	6 ft 1 in (1.85 m)	Jr	Bozeman HS	Bozeman, MT

Head coach

- Gordy Presnell (Northwest Nazarene)

Assistant coach(es)

- Cody Butler (Nevada)
- Heather Sower (Boise State)
- Cariann Ramirez (Boise State)

Legend

- (C) Team captain
- (S) Suspended
- (I) Ineligible
- (W) Walk-on
- Injured
- Current redshirt

Roster

== Schedule ==
Date time, TV	Rank^{#}	Opponent^{#}	Result	Record	Site (attendance) city, state
Exhibition
Nov 2, 2018*; 7:00 pm		Concordia (OR)	W 99–68		Taco Bell Arena (592); Boise, ID
Non-conference regular season
Nov 8, 2018*; 5:00 pm		Cal State Northridge	W 74–63	1–0	Taco Bell Arena (419); Boise, ID
Nov 10, 2018*; 4:30 pm		Southern Oregon	W 91–46	2–0	Taco Bell Arena (903); Boise, ID
Nov 16, 2018*; 5:30 pm		Northwest Christian	W 93–26	3–0	Taco Bell Arena (749); Boise, ID
Nov 19, 2018*; 7:00 pm		No. 5 Louisville	L 55–74	3–1	Taco Bell Arena (4,125); Boise, ID
Nov 23, 2018*; 6:00 pm		vs. Idaho; Beach Classic	W 91–85	4–1	Walter Pyramid; Long Beach, CA
Nov 24, 2018*; 3:00 pm		vs. Northern Iowa; Beach Classic	W 61–60	5–1	Walter Pyramid; Long Beach, CA
Dec 1, 2018*; 2:00 pm		at Washington State	L 71–95	5–2	Beasley Coliseum (547); Pullman, WA
Dec 7, 2018*; 7:00 pm		Eastern Washington	W 67–55	6–2	Taco Bell Arena (625); Boise, ID
Dec 15, 2018*; 5:00 pm		vs. Saint Francis (PA); Husky Classic semifinals	W 78–64	7–2	Alaska Airlines Arena (1,600); Seattle, WA
Dec 16, 2018*; 5:00 pm		at Washington; Husky Classic championship	W 73–69	8–2	Alaska Airlines Arena (1,417); Seattle, WA
Dec 19, 2018*; 5:30 pm		Southern Utah	W 88–53	9–2	Taco Bell Arena; Boise, ID
Mountain West regular season
Jan 2, 2019; 7:00 pm		Wyoming	W 72–64	10–2 (1–0)	Taco Bell Arena (1,097); Boise, ID
Jan 5, 2019; 2:00 pm		at San Diego State	W 69–66	11–2 (2–0)	Viejas Arena (662); San Diego, CA
Jan 12, 2019; 1:00 pm		San Jose State	W 99–68	12–2 (3–0)	Taco Bell Arena (1,284); Boise, ID
Jan 16, 2019; 7:30 pm		at Nevada	W 75–74	13–2 (4–0)	Lawlor Events Center (872); Reno, NV
Jan 19, 2019; 2:00 pm		at Fresno State	W 72–60	14–2 (5–0)	Save Mart Center (2,294); Fresno, CA
Jan 23, 2019; 7:00 pm		Air Force	W 79–48	15–2 (6–0)	Taco Bell Arena (738); Boise, ID
Jan 26, 2019; 2:00 pm		at Wyoming	L 52–64	15–3 (6–1)	Arena-Auditorium (3,621); Laramie, WY
Jan 30, 2019; 7:00 pm		Colorado State	W 70–57	16–3 (7–1)	Taco Bell Arena (1,181); Boise, ID
Feb 2, 2019; 2:00 pm		Nevada	W 80–65	17–3 (8–1)	Taco Bell Arena (1,627); Boise, ID
Feb 6, 2019; 7:00 pm		at UNLV	W 64–57	18–3 (9–1)	Cox Pavilion (1,003); Paradise, NV
Feb 9, 2019; 3:00 pm		at San Jose State	W 83–69	19–3 (10–1)	Event Center Arena (402); San Jose, CA
Feb 13, 2019; 7:00 pm		Fresno State	W 83–76	20–3 (11–1)	Taco Bell Arena (1,230); Boise, ID
Feb 16, 2019; 2:00 pm		San Diego State	W 91–67	21–3 (12–1)	Taco Bell Arena (1,875); Boise, ID
Feb 23, 2019; 2:00 pm		at Utah State	L 68–81	21–4 (12–2)	Smith Spectrum (451); Logan, UT
Feb 27, 2019; 7:00 pm		at Colorado State	W 72–63 ^{OT}	22–4 (13–2)	Moby Arena (1,110); Fort Collins, CO
Mar 2, 2019; 2:00 pm		UNLV	W 53–38	23–4 (14–2)	Taco Bell Arena (1,339); Boise, ID
Mar 4, 2019; 7:00 pm		New Mexico	W 70–66	24–4 (15–2)	Taco Bell Arena (2,682); Boise, ID
Mar 7, 2019; 7:00 pm		at Air Force	W 80–60	25–4 (16–2)	Clune Arena (368); Colorado Springs, CO
Mountain West Women's Tournament
Mar 11, 2019; 1:00 pm, Stadium	(1)	vs. (8) Nevada; Quarterfinals	W 72–67	26–4	Thomas & Mack Center; Paradise, NV
Mar 12, 2019; 7:00 pm, Stadium	(1)	vs. (4) Fresno State; Semifinals	W 89–77	27–4	Thomas & Mack Center; Paradise, NV
Mar 13, 2019; 8:00 pm, CBSSN	(1)	vs. (3) Wyoming; Championship Game	W 68–51	28–4	Thomas & Mack Center (2,011); Paradise, NV
NCAA Women's Tournament
Mar 23, 2019*; 4:00 pm, ESPN2	(13 A)	at (4 A) No. 11 Oregon State; First Round	L 75–80 ^{OT}	28–5	Gill Coliseum (5,089); Corvallis, OR
*Non-conference game. ^{#}Rankings from AP Poll. (#) Tournament seedings in parentheses. A=Albany Region. All times are in Mountain Time.

== Rankings ==
2018–19 NCAA Division I women's basketball rankings

Regular season polls
Poll	Pre- Season	Week 2	Week 3	Week 4	Week 5	Week 6	Week 7	Week 8	Week 9	Week 10	Week 11	Week 12	Week 13	Week 14	Week 15	Week 16	Week 17	Week 18	Week 19	Final
AP				RV								RV			RV	RV			RV	N/A
Coaches		N/A	RV									RV				RV	RV	RV	RV	RV

Legend
	Increase in ranking
	Decrease in ranking
	Not ranked previous week
(RV)	Received Votes
(NR)	Not Ranked

== See also ==
2018–19 Boise State Broncos men's basketball team
