= 2018–19 New Mexico Lobos women's basketball team =

Intercollegiate basketball season

2018–19 New Mexico Lobos women's basketball

WNIT, First Round
- Conference: Mountain West Conference
- Record: 24–7 (14–4 MW)
- Head coach: Mike Bradbury (3rd season)
- Assistant coaches: Valerie King; Bill Ferrara; Symone Denham
- Home arena: Dreamstyle Arena

2018–19 Mountain West Conference women's basketball standings
	Conf.				Overall
Team	W		L	PCT	W		L	PCT
Boise State †	16	–	2	.889	28	–	5	.848
New Mexico	14	–	4	.778	24	–	7	.774
Wyoming	13	–	5	.722	25	–	9	.735
Fresno State	11	–	7	.611	19	–	13	.594
Utah State	10	–	8	.556	17	–	15	.531
UNLV	10	–	8	.556	12	–	18	.400
Nevada	7	–	11	.389	12	–	19	.387
San Diego State	7	–	11	.389	14	–	18	.438
San Jose State	5	–	13	.278	6	–	24	.200
Air Force	4	–	14	.222	8	–	22	.267
Colorado State	2	–	16	.111	8	–	22	.267
† 2019 MW tournament winner Rankings from AP poll

The 2018–19 New Mexico Lobos women's basketball team represented the University of New Mexico during the 2018–19 NCAA Division I women's basketball season. The Lobos, led by third year head coach Mike Bradbury. They played their home games at Dreamstyle Arena and were a member of the Mountain West Conference. They finished the season 24–7, 14–4 in Mountain West play to finish in second place. They lost in the quarterfinals of the Mountain West Conference women's basketball tournament to San Diego State. They received an automatic bid to the Women's National Invitation Tournament where they got upset by Denver in the first round.

== Roster ==
2018–19 New Mexico Lobos women's basketball team
Players
Coaches

Pos.	#	Name	Height	Year	Previous school	Hometown
G	1	Quincy Noble	5 ft 10 in (1.78 m)	Fr	McKinney HS	McKinney, TX
F	2	Bre’Asiajah Mathews	6 ft 0 in (1.83 m)	Fr	Lakeview Centennial HS	Garland, TX
G/F	3	Ahlise Hurst	5 ft 9 in (1.75 m)	Fr	Bendigo Senior Secondary	Bendigo, Australia
G	4	Jayla Everett	5 ft 10 in (1.78 m)	Fr	Kirkwood HS	St. Louis, MO
G	11	Emily Lines	6 ft 1 in (1.85 m)	Sr	First Baptist Academy	Naples, FL
F	12	Bride Kennedy-Hopoate (redshirt)	6 ft 4 in (1.93 m)	Sr	Iowa State	Brisbane, Australia
F	13	Shaiquel McGruder	6 ft 0 in (1.83 m)	Fr	Trotwood-Madison HS	Trotwood, OH
G	14	Najala Howell (redshirt)	5 ft 10 in (1.78 m)	Sr	DeSoto HS; UTEP	DeSoto, TX
G	15	Aisia Robertson	5 ft 8 in (1.73 m)	RS Jr	Bishop O'Dowd HS; Kansas	San Francisco, CA
F	21	Nike McClure	6 ft 3 in (1.91 m)	RS Sr	W. F. West HS; Washington State	Tenino, WA
G	23	Jaedyn De La Cerda	5 ft 6 in (1.68 m)	So	Roswell HS	Roswell, NM
C	24	Erica Moore	6 ft 2 in (1.88 m)	RS Sr	Mount Vernon HS; Purdue	Fortville, IN
F	32	Antonia Anderson	6 ft 2 in (1.88 m)	So	Byron P. Steele II HS	Cibolo, TX
G	35	Madi Washington	5 ft 9 in (1.75 m)	So	Red Oak HS	Red Oak, TX
C	44	Jaisa Nunn	6 ft 3 in (1.91 m)	Sr	Juanita HS	Kirkland, WA

Head coach

- Mike Bradbury (Chattanooga)

Assistant coach(es)

- Valerie King (Cincinnati)
- Bill Ferrara (Florida)
- Symone Denham (Wright State)

Legend

- (C) Team captain
- (S) Suspended
- (I) Ineligible
- (W) Walk-on
- Injured
- Current redshirt

Roster

== Schedule and results ==
Date time, TV	Rank^{#}	Opponent^{#}	Result	Record	Site (attendance) city, state
Exhibition
Oct 30, 2018*; 7:00 pm		Lubbock Christian	W 62–55		Dreamstyle Arena (4,240); Albuquerque, NM
Nov 4, 2018*; 2:00 pm		Eastern New Mexico	W 91–43		Dreamstyle Arena (4,275); Albuquerque, NM
Non-conference regular season
Nov 9, 2018*; 7:00 pm		Texas State; Preseason WNIT First Round	W 82–51	1–0	Dreamstyle Arena (4,585); Albuquerque, NM
Nov 11, 2018*; 2:00 pm		Auburn; Preseason WNIT Quarterfinals	L 76–79	1–1	Dreamstyle Arena (4,419); Albuquerque, NM
Nov 18, 2018*; 2:00 pm		Hartford; Preseason WNIT Consolation round	W 72–65	2–1	Dreamstyle Arena (4,330); Albuquerque, NM
Nov 24, 2018*; 1:00 pm		at Houston	W 89–84 ^{OT}	3–1	H&PE Arena (4,330); Houston, TX
Nov 28, 2018*; 7:00 pm		Oklahoma	W 84–80	4–1	Dreamstyle Arena (5,152); Albuquerque, NM
Dec 1, 2018*; 2:00 pm		New Mexico State; Rio Grande Rivalry	W 83–58	5–1	Dreamstyle Arena (5,327); Albuquerque, NM
Dec 5, 2018*; 7:00 pm		UTEP	W 69–51	6–1	Dreamstyle Arena (4,490); Albuquerque, NM
Dec 8, 2018*; 2:00 pm		at Northern Arizona	W 84–55	7–1	Walkup Skydome (406); Flagstaff, AZ
Dec 15, 2018*; 2:00 pm, AggieVision		at New Mexico State; Rio Grande Rivalry	W 75–50	8–1	Pan American Center (889); Las Cruces, NM
Dec 19, 2018*; 7:00 pm		Sacramento State; Lobo Invitational	W 85–53	9–1	Dreamstyle Arena (4,708); Albuquerque, NM
Dec 20, 2018*; 7:00 pm		Stephen F. Austin; Lobo Invitational	W 74–33	10–1	Dreamstyle Arena (4,702); Albuquerque, NM
Dec 29, 2018*; 3:00 pm		at Long Beach State	Canceled		Walter Pyramid; Long Beach, CA
Mountain West regular season
Jan 2, 2019; 7:00 pm		Air Force	W 78–57	11–1 (1–0)	Dreamstyle Arena (4,608); Albuquerque, NM
Jan 5, 2019; 3:00 pm, Stadium		at Nevada	W 66–64	12–1 (2–0)	Lawlor Events Center (1,058); Reno, NV
Jan 9, 2019; 7:00 pm		at UNLV	L 57–66	12–2 (2–1)	Cox Pavilion (774); Paradise, NV
Jan 12, 2019; 2:00 pm		Colorado State	W 70–58	13–2 (3–1)	Dreamstyle Arena (5,809); Albuquerque, NM
Jan 16, 2019; 7:00 pm		San Diego State	W 70–62	14–2 (4–1)	Dreamstyle Arena (4,976); Albuquerque, NM
Jan 19, 2019; 2:00 pm		at Wyoming	W 78–75	15–2 (5–1)	Arena-Auditorium (2,590); Laramie, WY
Jan 23, 2019; 7:00 pm		UNLV	W 80–77 ^{OT}	16–2 (6–1)	Dreamstyle Arena (5,009); Albuquerque, NM
Jan 26, 2019; 2:00 pm		at Utah State	W 68–64	17–2 (7–1)	Smith Spectrum (597); Logan, UT
Feb 2, 2019; 2:00 pm		Fresno State	W 82–73	18–2 (8–1)	Dreamstyle Arena (8,068); Albuquerque, NM
Feb 6, 2019; 12:00 pm		at San Diego State	L 59–61	18–3 (8–2)	Viejas Arena (4,272); San Diego, CA
Feb 9, 2019; 1:00 pm		Nevada	W 85–74	19–3 (9–2)	Dreamstyle Arena (6,316); Albuquerque, NM
Feb 13, 2019; 8:00 pm		at San Jose State	W 79–60	20–3 (10–2)	Event Center Arena (603); San Jose, CA
Feb 16, 2019; 3:00 pm		at Fresno State	L 70–77	20–4 (10–3)	Save Mart Center (2,228); Fresno, CA
Feb 20, 2019; 7:00 pm		Utah State	W 74–56	21–4 (11–3)	Dreamstyle Arena (4,749); Albuquerque, NM
Feb 27, 2019; 7:00 pm		San Jose State	W 110–72	22–4 (12–3)	Dreamstyle Arena (5,974); Albuquerque, NM
Mar 2, 2019; 2:00 pm		at Colorado State	W 79–56	23–4 (13–3)	Moby Arena (1,531); Fort Collins, CO
Mar 4, 2019; 7:00 pm		at Boise State	L 66–70	23–5 (13–4)	Taco Bell Arena (2,682); Boise, ID
Mar 7, 2019; 7:00 pm		Wyoming	W 57–50	24–5 (14–4)	Dreamstyle Arena (8,152); Albuquerque, NM
Mountain West Women's Tournament
Mar 11, 2019; 6:30 pm, Stadium	(2)	vs. (7) San Diego State; Quarterfinals	L 61–70	24–6	Thomas & Mack Center; Paradise, NV
WNI
Mar 21, 2019*; 7:00 pm		Denver; First Round	L 75–83	24–7	Dreamstyle Arena (2,875); Albuquerque, NM
*Non-conference game. ^{#}Rankings from AP Poll. (#) Tournament seedings in parentheses. All times are in Mountain Time.

== Rankings ==
2018–19 NCAA Division I women's basketball rankings

Regular season polls
Poll	Pre- season	Week 2	Week 3	Week 4	Week 5	Week 6	Week 7	Week 8	Week 9	Week 10	Week 11	Week 12	Week 13	Week 14	Week 15	Week 16	Week 17	Week 18	Week 19	Final
AP													RV	RV						N/A
Coaches				RV	RV	RV	RV	RV	RV	RV	RV	RV	RV	RV	RV	RV	RV			

Legend
	Increase in ranking
	Decrease in ranking
	Not ranked previous week
(RV)	Received Votes
(NR)	Not Ranked

== See also ==
2018–19 New Mexico Lobos men's basketball team
