= 2018–19 Air Force Falcons women's basketball team =

Intercollegiate basketball season

2018–19 Air Force Falcons women's basketball
- Conference: Mountain West Conference
- Record: 8–22 (4–14 Mountain West)
- Head coach: Chris Gobrecht (4th season)
- Assistant coaches: Stacy McIntyre; Erin Mills-Reid; Clare Fitzpatrick; Rynae Rasley
- Home arena: Clune Arena

2018–19 Mountain West Conference women's basketball standings
	Conf.				Overall
Team	W		L	PCT	W		L	PCT
Boise State †	16	–	2	.889	28	–	5	.848
New Mexico	14	–	4	.778	24	–	7	.774
Wyoming	13	–	5	.722	25	–	9	.735
Fresno State	11	–	7	.611	19	–	13	.594
Utah State	10	–	8	.556	17	–	15	.531
UNLV	10	–	8	.556	12	–	18	.400
Nevada	7	–	11	.389	12	–	19	.387
San Diego State	7	–	11	.389	14	–	18	.438
San Jose State	5	–	13	.278	6	–	24	.200
Air Force	4	–	14	.222	8	–	22	.267
Colorado State	2	–	16	.111	8	–	22	.267
† 2019 MW tournament winner Rankings from AP poll

The 2018–19 Air Force Falcons women's basketball team represented the United States Air Force Academy during the 2018–19 NCAA Division I women's basketball season. The Falcons, led by fourth-year head coach Chris Gobrecht, played their home games at the Clune Arena on the Air Force Academy's main campus in Colorado Springs, Colorado and were members of the Mountain West Conference (MVC). They finished the season 8–22, 4–14 in Mountain West play, to finish in tenth place. They lost in the first round of the Mountain West women's tournament to San Diego State.

== Roster ==
2018–19 Air Force Falcons women's basketball team
Players
Coaches

Pos.	#	Name	Height	Year	Previous school	Hometown
G	0	Haley Jones	6 ft 0 in (1.83 m)	Fr	West	Torrance, CA
G	1	Briana Autrey	5 ft 5 in (1.65 m)	Fr	Nansemond River	Suffolk, VA
G	2	Audrey Gadison	5 ft 7 in (1.7 m)	Fr	St. Croix Lutheran Academy	Blaine, MN
G	3	Cierra Winters	5 ft 7 in (1.7 m)	Fr	Franklin	El Paso, TX
G	5	Kennedy Beale	5 ft 6 in (1.68 m)	So	Cape Henry Collegiate	Norfolk, VA
G	10	Venessannah Itugbu	5 ft 9 in (1.75 m)	Sr	Mesa Ridge	Colorado Springs, CO
G	11	Sarah Pierce	5 ft 7 in (1.7 m)	Jr	Community	Unionville, TN
C	12	Jenna Adams	6 ft 1 in (1.85 m)	Fr	Bishop Fenwick	Lebanon, OH
G	13	Emily Conroe	5 ft 10 in (1.78 m)	So	FHSAA	Fredericksburg, VA
G	14	Noelle Tomes	5 ft 8 in (1.73 m)	So	East Ridge	Woodbury, MN
G	15	Tanisha Elbourne	5 ft 8 in (1.73 m)	Fr	Punahou School	Honolulu, HI
F	21	Michaela McFalls	5 ft 11 in (1.8 m)	So	Lenoir City	Lenoir City, TN
F	23	Riley Snyder	6 ft 0 in (1.83 m)	Fr	Fruita Monument	Fruita, CO
G	24	Alexis Springfield	5 ft 6 in (1.68 m)	So	Mesquite	Gilbert, AZ
F	25	Audrey Weiner	6 ft 0 in (1.83 m)	Fr	Buford	Buford, GA
F	30	Naomi Hughes	6 ft 0 in (1.83 m)	So	Grovetown	Grovetown, GA
G	32	Kaelin Immel	5 ft 9 in (1.75 m)	So	Southridge	Beaverton, OR
G	35	Coco Kuchins	5 ft 9 in (1.75 m)	Fr	Winston Churchill	Chevy Chase, MD
G	41	Natalie Nicks	5 ft 7 in (1.7 m)	Fr	West Florida	Pensacola, FL
F	55	Kassady Huffman	6 ft 2 in (1.88 m)	Jr	Air Academy	Colorado Springs, CO

Head coach

- Chris Gobrecht (USC)

Assistant coach(es)

- Stacy McIntyre (Kentucky)
- Erin Mills-Reid (Fairleigh Dickinson)
- Clare Fitzpatrick (Cornell)
- Rynae Rasley (CCNY)

Legend

- (C) Team captain
- (S) Suspended
- (I) Ineligible
- (W) Walk-on
- Injured
- Current redshirt

Roster
Last update: October 25, 2024

== Schedule and results ==
Date time, TV	Rank^{#}	Opponent^{#}	Result	Record	Site (attendance) city, state
Non-conference regular season
November 6, 2018*; 7:15 p.m.		Western Colorado	W 72–54	1–0	Clune Arena (376); Colorado Springs, CO
November 9, 2018*; 12:00 p.m.		George Mason	L 71–78	1–1	Clune Arena (991); Colorado Springs, CO
November 11, 2018*; 1:00 p.m.		at Denver	L 66–92	1–2	Hamilton Gymnasium (386); Denver, CO
November 16, 2018*; 7:00 p.m.		Fairleigh Dickinson	W 85–37	2–2	Clune Arena (376); Colorado Springs, CO
November 21, 2018*; 3:00 p.m.		at Army	W 71–60	3–2	Christl Arena (913); West Point, NY
November 24, 2018*; 11:00 a.m.		at Northeastern	L 41–54	3–3	Cabot Center (255); Boston, MA
November 28, 2018*; 5:00 p.m.		Northern Colorado	W 69–57	4–3	Clune Arena (446); Colorado Springs, CO
December 2, 2018*; 2:00 p.m.		at No. 20 Minnesota	L 50–67	4–4	Williams Arena (3,642); Minneapolis, MN
December 7, 2018*; 4:30 p.m.		Navy	L 47–54	4–5	Clune Arena (1,013); Colorado Springs, CO
December 18, 2018*; 8:00 p.m.		at Portland	L 60–79	4–6	Chiles Center (286); Portland, OR
December 20, 2018*; 12:00 p.m.		at No. 7 Oregon	L 36–82	4–7	Matthew Knight Arena (7,967); Eugene, OR
Mountain West regular season
January 2, 2019; 7:00 p.m.		at New Mexico	L 57–78	4–8 (0–1)	Dreamstyle Arena (4,608); Albuquerque, NM
January 5, 2019; 2:00 p.m.		Utah State	L 44–49	4–9 (0–2)	Clune Arena (509); Colorado Springs, CO
January 9, 2019; 7:00 p.m.		Colorado State	W 63–48	5–9 (1–2)	Clune Arena (462); Colorado Springs, CO
January 12, 2019; 2:00 p.m.		at San Diego State	L 61–70	5–10 (1–3)	Viejas Arena (566); San Diego, CA
January 16, 2019; 1:00 p.m.		at UNLV	L 56–66	5–11 (1–4)	Thomas & Mack Center (3,149); Paradise, NV
January 19, 2019; 2:00 p.m.		Nevada	W 79–74 ^{OT}	6–11 (2–4)	Clune Arena (747); Colorado Springs, CO
January 23, 2019; 7:00 p.m.		at Boise State	L 48–79	6–12 (2–5)	Taco Bell Arena (738); Boise, ID
January 26, 2019; 2:00 p.m.		San Jose State	W 70–56	7–12 (3–5)	Clune Arena (418); Colorado Springs, CO
January 30, 2019; 7:00 p.m.		San Diego State	W 75–66	8–12 (4–5)	Clune Arena (337); Colorado Springs, CO
February 2, 2019; 2:00 p.m.		at Colorado State	L 48–55	8–13 (4–6)	Moby Arena (1,436); Fort Collins, CO
February 6, 2019; 6:30 p.m.		at Wyoming	L 60–80	8–14 (4–7)	Arena-Auditorium (1,071); Laramie, WY
February 13, 2019; 7:00 p.m.		UNLV	L 47–62	8–15 (4–8)	Clune Arena (523); Colorado Springs, CO
February 16, 2019; 2:00 p.m.		at Utah State	L 55–64	8–16 (4–9)	Smith Spectrum (643); Logan, UT
February 20, 2019; 7:00 p.m.		Fresno State	L 70–77	8–17 (4–10)	Clune Arena (597); Colorado Springs, CO
February 23, 2019; 3:00 p.m.		at San Jose State	L 63–70	8–18 (4–11)	Event Center Arena (516); San Jose, CA
March 2, 2019; 2:00 p.m.		Wyoming	L 56–59 ^{OT}	8–19 (4–12)	Clune Arena (742); Colorado Springs, CO
March 4, 2019; 6:30 p.m.		at Nevada	L 54–79	8–20 (4–13)	Lawlor Events Center (978); Reno, NV
March 7, 2019; 7:00 p.m.		Boise State	L 60–80	8–21 (4–14)	Clune Arena (368); Colorado Springs, CO
Mountain West women's tournament
March 10, 2019; 5:30 p.m., Stadium	(10)	vs. (7) San Diego State; First round	L 55–63	8–22	Thomas & Mack Center; Paradise, NV
*Non-conference game. ^{#}Rankings from AP poll. (#) Tournament seedings in parentheses. All times are in Mountain.

== See also ==
- 2018–19 Air Force Falcons men's basketball team
