= 2018–19 Utah State Aggies women's basketball team =

Intercollegiate basketball season

2018–19 Utah State Aggies women's basketball

WBI, quarterfinals
- Conference: Mountain West Conference
- Record: 17–16 (10–8 Mountain West)
- Head coach: Jerry Finkbeiner (7th season)
- Assistant coaches: Ben Finkbeiner; Ashley Gill; Paris Johnson
- Home arena: Smith Spectrum

2018–19 Mountain West Conference women's basketball standings
	Conf.				Overall
Team	W		L	PCT	W		L	PCT
Boise State †	16	–	2	.889	28	–	5	.848
New Mexico	14	–	4	.778	24	–	7	.774
Wyoming	13	–	5	.722	25	–	9	.735
Fresno State	11	–	7	.611	19	–	13	.594
Utah State	10	–	8	.556	17	–	15	.531
UNLV	10	–	8	.556	12	–	18	.400
Nevada	7	–	11	.389	12	–	19	.387
San Diego State	7	–	11	.389	14	–	18	.438
San Jose State	5	–	13	.278	6	–	24	.200
Air Force	4	–	14	.222	8	–	22	.267
Colorado State	2	–	16	.111	8	–	22	.267
† 2019 MW tournament winner Rankings from AP poll

The 2018–19 Utah State Aggies women's basketball team represented Utah State University in the 2018–19 NCAA Division I women's basketball season. The Aggies were led by seventh-year head coach Jerry Finkbeiner. The Aggies played their home games at the Smith Spectrum in Logan, Utah as members of the Mountain West Conference. They finished the season 17–16, 10–8 in Mountain West play, to finish in a tie for fifth place. They advanced to the quarterfinals of the Mountain West women's tournament, where they lost to Wyoming. They received an invitation to the WBI, where they defeated UC Riverside before losing to North Texas in the quarterfinals.

== Roster ==
2018–19 Utah State Aggies women's basketball team
Players
Coaches

Pos.	#	Name	Height	Year	Previous school	Hometown
G	1	Eliza West	5 ft 5 in (1.65 m)	Jr	Peninsula School	Mount Martha, Australia
G	3	Olivia West	5 ft 5 in (1.65 m)	Jr	Templestowe College	Launceston, Australia
G	4	Stephanie Gorman	5 ft 10 in (1.78 m)	Fr	Wodonga Senior Secondary College	Wodonga, Australia
G/F	5	Shannon Dufficy	6 ft 1 in (1.85 m)	Jr	Our Lady of Mercy College	Preston, Australia
G	11	Lindsey Jensen-Baker	5 ft 9 in (1.75 m)	RS Jr	Sky View	Smithfield, UT
G/F	12	Hailey Bassett-Meacham	6 ft 2 in (1.88 m)	Jr	Layton	Layton, UT
F	14	Roxani Bounouka	6 ft 2 in (1.88 m)	Fr	Hellenic College of Thessaloniki	Thessaloniki, Greece
C	15	Laura Daulton	6 ft 2 in (1.88 m)	So	Oak Ridge	Spring, TX
G	22	Rachel Brewster	5 ft 11 in (1.8 m)	Sr	Rowville Secondary College	Melbourne, Australia
F	24	Marlene Aniambossou	6 ft 1 in (1.85 m)	Jr	Notre Dame Des Apôtres; Frank Phillips College	Cotonou, Benin
G	32	Emmie Harris	5 ft 10 in (1.78 m)	So	Boyle County	Danville, KY
F	34	Emma Dudley	6 ft 1 in (1.85 m)	Fr	Sana Fe Christian	Rancho Santa Fe, CA
F	41	Taylor Franson	6 ft 1 in (1.85 m)	So	American Fork	American Fork, UT
C	44	Deja Mason	6 ft 4 in (1.93 m)	Sr	Brennan HS	San Antonio, TX

Head coach

- Jerry Finkbeiner (Southern Nazarene)

Assistant coach(es)

- Ben Finkbeiner (Oral Roberts)
- Ashley Gill (Washington State)
- Paris Johnson (San Diego State)

Legend

- (C) Team captain
- (S) Suspended
- (I) Ineligible
- (W) Walk-on
- Injured
- Current redshirt

Roster
Last update: January 20, 2025

== Schedule ==
Date time, TV	Rank^{#}	Opponent^{#}	Result	Record	Site (attendance) city, state
Exhibition
November 2, 2018*; 7:00 p.m.		Westminster (Utah)	W 77–56		Smith Spectrum (602); Logan, UT
Non-conference regular season
November 6, 2018*; 8:00 p.m.		at Washington State	W 72–61	1–0	Beasley Coliseum (526); Pullman, WA
November 9, 2018*; 2:00 p.m.		Northern New Mexico	W 106–35	2–0	Smith Spectrum (397); Logan, UT
November 14, 2018*; 7:00 p.m.		No. 3 Oregon	L 58–88	2–1	Smith Spectrum (718); Logan, UT
November 20, 2018*; 7:00 p.m.		BYU; Old Oquirrh Bucket	L 57–62 ^{OT}	2–2	Smith Spectrum (730); Logan, UT
November 23, 2018*; 5:30 p.m.		vs. USC; Nugget Classic	L 46–55	2–3	Lawlor Events Center (1,070); Reno, NV
November 25, 2018*; 12:00 p.m.		vs. Colorado; Nugget Classic	L 58–68	2–4	Lawlor Events Center (137); Reno, NV
November 28, 2018*; 8:00 p.m.		at Portland	L 54–61	2–5	Chiles Center (359); Portland, OR
December 5, 2018*; 6:00 p.m.		at UTSA	W 62–56	3–5	Convocation Center (344); San Antonio, TX
December 8, 2018*; 2:00 p.m.		at North Texas	W 57–41	4–5	The Super Pit (597); Denton, TX
December 15, 2018*; 2:00 p.m.		Utah Valley; Old Oquirrh Bucket	W 67–62	5–5	Smith Spectrum (357); Logan, UT
December 22, 2018*; 2:00 p.m.		Long Beach State	L 48–50	5–6	Smith Spectrum (285); Logan, UT
Mountain West regular season
January 2, 2019; 7:00 p.m.		at Nevada	W 79–76 ^{2OT}	6–6 (1–0)	Smith Spectrum (247); Logan, UT
January 5, 2019; 2:00 p.m.		at Air Force	W 49–44	7–6 (2–0)	Clune Arena (509); Colorado Springs, CO
January 9, 2019; 8:00 p.m.		at Fresno State	L 59–70	7–7 (2–1)	Save Mart Center (1,931); Fresno, CA
January 12, 2019; 2:00 p.m.		Wyoming	W 50–42	8–7 (3–1)	Smith Spectrum (265); Logan, UT
January 16, 2019; 11:00 a.m.		San Jose State	W 82–49	9–7 (4–1)	Smith Spectrum (3,185); Logan, UT
January 19, 2019; 2:00 p.m.		at Colorado State	W 72–53	10–7 (5–1)	Moby Arena (1,270); Fort Collins, CO
January 26, 2019; 2:00 p.m.		New Mexico	L 64–68	10–8 (5–2)	Smith Spectrum (597); Logan, UT
January 30, 2019; 8:00 p.m.		at San Jose State	L 59–68	10–9 (5–3)	Event Center Arena (836); San Jose, CA
February 2, 2019; 3:00 p.m.		at UNLV	L 56–77	10–10 (5–4)	Cox Pavilion; Paradise, NV
February 6, 2019; 7:00 p.m.		Fresno State	L 53–64	10–11 (5–5)	Smith Spectrum; Logan, UT
February 9, 2019; 2:00 p.m.		San Diego State	L 54–56	10–12 (5–6)	Smith Spectrum (422); Logan, UT
February 13, 2019; 6:30 p.m.		at Wyoming	L 35–53	10–13 (5–7)	Arena-Auditorium (2,400); Laramie, WY
February 16, 2019; 2:00 p.m.		Air Force	W 64–55	11–13 (6–7)	Smith Spectrum (643); Logan, UT
February 20, 2019; 7:00 p.m.		at New Mexico	L 56–74	11–14 (6–8)	Dreamstyle Arena (4,749); Albuquerque, NM
February 23, 2019; 2:00 p.m.		Boise State	W 81–68	12–14 (7–8)	Smith Spectrum (451); Logan, UT
February 27, 2019; 7:30 p.m.		at San Diego State	W 65–52	13–14 (8–8)	Viejas Arena (447); San Diego, CA
March 2, 2019; 2:00 p.m.		at Nevada	W 71–59	14–14 (9–8)	Lawlor Events Center (1,131); Reno, NV
March 4, 2019; 7:00 p.m.		Colorado State	W 70–59	15–14 (10–8)	Smith Spectrum (656); Logan, UT
Mountain West women's tournament
March 10, 2019; 8:00 p.m., Stadium	(6)	vs. (11) Colorado State; First round	W 62–59	16–14	Thomas & Mack Center (1,550); Paradise, NV
March 11, 2019; 9:00 p.m., Stadium	(6)	vs. (3) Wyoming; Quarterfinals	L 41–64	16–15	Thomas & Mack Center (2,231); Paradise, NV
WBI
March 20, 2019*; 8:00 p.m.		at UC Riverside; First round	W 68–60	17–15	SRC Arena (128); Riverside, CA
March 26, 2019*; 6:00 p.m.		at North Texas; Quarterfinals	L 54–56	17–16	The Super Pit (506); Denton, TX
*Non-conference game. ^{#}Rankings from AP poll. (#) Tournament seedings in parentheses. All times are in Mountain.

== See also ==
- 2018–19 Utah State Aggies men's basketball team
