= 2018–19 Fresno State Bulldogs women's basketball team =

Intercollegiate basketball season

2018–19 Fresno State Bulldogs women's basketball

WNIT, First Round
- Conference: Mountain West Conference
- Record: 19–13 (11–7 Mountain West)
- Head coach: Jaime White (5th season)
- Assistant coaches: Mandi Carver; Bobby Ratterree; Shannon Bush
- Home arena: Save Mart Center

2018–19 Mountain West Conference women's basketball standings
| | Conf. | | | | Overall |
| Team | W | | L | PCT | W | | L | PCT |
|---|---|---|---|---|---|---|---|---|
| Boise State † | 16 | – | 2 | .889 | 28 | – | 5 | .848 |
| New Mexico | 14 | – | 4 | .778 | 24 | – | 7 | .774 |
| Wyoming | 13 | – | 5 | .722 | 25 | – | 9 | .735 |
| Fresno State | 11 | – | 7 | .611 | 19 | – | 13 | .594 |
| Utah State | 10 | – | 8 | .556 | 17 | – | 15 | .531 |
| UNLV | 10 | – | 8 | .556 | 12 | – | 18 | .400 |
| Nevada | 7 | – | 11 | .389 | 12 | – | 19 | .387 |
| San Diego State | 7 | – | 11 | .389 | 14 | – | 18 | .438 |
| San Jose State | 5 | – | 13 | .278 | 6 | – | 24 | .200 |
| Air Force | 4 | – | 14 | .222 | 8 | – | 22 | .267 |
| Colorado State | 2 | – | 16 | .111 | 8 | – | 22 | .267 |
† 2019 MW tournament winner Rankings from AP poll

The 2018–19 Fresno State Bulldogs women's basketball team represented California State University, Fresno during the 2018–19 NCAA Division I women's basketball season. The Bulldogs, led by fifth year head coach Jaime White, played their home games at the Save Mart Center and were members of the Mountain West Conference. They finished the season 19–13, 11–7 in Mountain West play to finish in fourth place. They advanced to the semifinal of the Mountain West women's tournament, where they lost to Boise State. They received an at-large bid to the WNIT, where they lost to Pacific in the first round.

== Roster ==
2018–19 Fresno State Bulldogs women's basketball team
Players
Coaches

| Pos. | # | Name | Height | Year | Previous school | Hometown |
|---|---|---|---|---|---|---|
| G | 2 | Raven Johnson | 5 ft 11 in (1.8 m) | Sr | Skyline | Dallas, TX |
| C | 5 | Katelin Noyer | 6 ft 4 in (1.93 m) | Jr | Westlake Girls | Auckland, New Zealand |
| G | 10 | Candace White | 5 ft 8 in (1.73 m) | Sr | Modesto Christian | Modesto, CA |
| F | 11 | Maddi Utti | 5 ft 10 in (1.78 m) | So | Seaside | Seaside, OR |
| F | 12 | Genna Ogier | 6 ft 1 in (1.85 m) | So | Yarra Valley Grammar | Melbourne, Australia |
| G | 13 | Breanne Knishka | 5 ft 10 in (1.78 m) | Sr | Cashmere | Dryden, WA |
| F | 14 | Jordanna Porter | 5 ft 11 in (1.8 m) | RS Jr | Ellison; Utah | Killeen, TX |
| G/F | 20 | Bree Delaney | 5 ft 10 in (1.78 m) | So | Monte Sant' Angelo Mercy | Sydney, Australia |
| F | 21 | Lydia Friberg | 6 ft 2 in (1.88 m) | Jr | Palm Beach State College | Luleå, Sweden |
| G | 22 | Aly Gamez | 5 ft 6 in (1.68 m) | So | MacArthur | Irving, TX |
| G/F | 30 | Kristina Cavey | 6 ft 0 in (1.83 m) | Jr | Berthoud | Berthoud, CO |
| F | 33 | Gabby Standifer | 5 ft 11 in (1.8 m) | Fr | Argyle | Argyle, TX |

Head coach

- Jaime White (Southern Utah)

Assistant coach(es)

- Mandi Carver (Idaho State)
- Bobby Ratterree (Northern Colorado)
- Shannon Bush (Holy Cross)

Legend

- (C) Team captain
- (S) Suspended
- (I) Ineligible
- (W) Walk-on
- Injured
- Current redshirt

Roster

== Schedule ==
| Date time, TV | Rank^{#} | Opponent^{#} | Result | Record | Site (attendance) city, state |
Exhibition
| Nov 2, 2018*; 5:00 pm | | Cal State Dominguez Hills | W 102–49 | | Save Mart Center; Fresno, CA |
Non-conference regular season
| Nov 6, 2018*; 11:30 am | | at Northern Arizona | L 73–86 | 0–1 | Rolle Activity Center (705); Flagstaff, AZ |
| Nov 14, 2018*; 7:00 pm | | Cal Poly | W 76–58 | 1–1 | Save Mart Center (1,836); Fresno, CA |
| Nov 20, 2018*; 7:00 pm | | Milwaukee | W 65–48 | 2–1 | Save Mart Center (1,896); Fresno, CA |
| Nov 23, 2018*; 5:00 pm | | UT Arlington | W 70–61 | 3–1 | Save Mart Center (1,958); Fresno, CA |
| Nov 28, 2018*; 5:00 pm | | at USC | L 61–62 | 3–2 | Galen Center (286); Los Angeles, CA |
| Dec 2, 2018*; 1:00 pm | | at Eastern Washington | W 68–58 | 4–2 | Reese Court (288); Cheney, WA |
| Dec 7, 2018*; 7:00 pm | | at UCLA | L 80–89 | 4–3 | Pauley Pavilion (1,190); Los Angeles, CA |
| Dec 12, 2018*; 5:00 pm | | Santa Clara | W 80–53 | 5–3 | Save Mart Center (2,001); Fresno, CA |
| Dec 14, 2018*; 7:00 pm | | Stanislaus State | W 86–51 | 6–3 | Save Mart Center (1,868); Fresno, CA |
| Dec 20, 2018*; 1:00 pm | | at No. 17 Arizona State | L 52–68 | 6–4 | Wells Fargo Arena (1,653); Tempe, AZ |
| Dec 29, 2018*; 2:00 pm | | Fresno Pacific | W 90–51 | 7–4 | Save Mart Center (2,113); Fresno, CA |
Mountain West regular season
| Jan 2, 2019; 7:00 pm | | San Jose State | W 77–48 | 8–4 (1–0) | Save Mart Center (2,080); Fresno, CA |
| Jan 5, 2019; 1:00 pm | | at Colorado State | W 66–55 | 9–4 (2–0) | Moby Arena (1,235); Fort Collins, CO |
| Jan 9, 2019; 7:00 pm | | Utah State | W 70–59 | 10–4 (3–0) | Save Mart Center (1,931); Fresno, CA |
| Jan 12, 2019; 2:00 pm | | at Nevada | W 79–63 | 11–4 (4–0) | Lawlor Events Center (1,021); Reno, NV |
| Jan 19, 2019; 1:00 pm | | Boise State | L 60–72 | 11–5 (4–1) | Save Mart Center (2,294); Fresno, CA |
| Jan 23, 2019; 6:30 pm | | at San Diego State | W 87–81 | 12–5 (5–1) | Viejas Arena (465); San Diego, CA |
| Jan 26, 2019; 2:00 pm | | Colorado State | W 57–54 | 13–5 (6–1) | Save Mart Center (2,187); Fresno, CA |
| Jan 30, 2019; 7:00 pm | | Wyoming | L 56–63 | 13–6 (6–2) | Save Mart Center (1,994); Fresno, CA |
| Feb 2, 2019; 1:00 pm | | at New Mexico | L 73–82 | 13–7 (6–3) | Dreamstyle Arena (8,068); Albuquerque, NM |
| Feb 6, 2019; 6:00 pm | | at Utah State | W 64–53 | 14–7 (7–3) | Smith Spectrum; Logan, UT |
| Feb 9, 2019; 2:00 pm | | UNLV | W 73–55 | 15–7 (8–3) | Save Mart Center (2,294); Fresno, CA |
| Feb 13, 2019; 6:00 pm | | at Boise State | L 76–83 | 15–8 (8–4) | Taco Bell Arena (1,230); Boise, ID |
| Feb 16, 2019; 2:00 pm | | New Mexico | W 77–70 | 16–8 (9–4) | Save Mart Center (2,228); Fresno, CA |
| Feb 20, 2019; 6:00 pm | | at Air Force | W 77–70 | 17–8 (10–4) | Clune Arena (597); Colorado Springs, CO |
| Feb 23, 2019; 2:00 pm | | Nevada | L 41–57 | 17–9 (10–5) | Save Mart Center (2,555); Fresno, CA |
| Feb 27, 2019; 5:30 pm | | at Wyoming | W 66–64 | 18–9 (11–5) | Arena-Auditorium (2,560); Laramie, WY |
| Mar 4, 2019; 7:00 pm | | San Diego State | L 58–59 | 18–10 (11–6) | Save Mart Center (2,208); Fresno, CA |
| Mar 7, 2019; 7:00 pm | | at San Jose State | L 57–65 | 18–11 (11–7) | Event Center Arena (1,626); San Jose, CA |
Mountain West tournament
| Mar 11, 2019; 2:30 pm, Stadium | (4) | vs. (5) UNLV; Quarterfinals | W 66–55 | 19–11 | Thomas & Mack Center (1,448); Paradise, NV |
| Mar 12, 2019; 6:00 pm, Stadium | (4) | vs. (1) Boise State; Semifinals | L 77–89 | 19–12 | Thomas & Mack Center; Paradise, NV |
WNIT
| Mar 20, 2019*; 7:00 pm | | Pacific; First Round | L 72–77 | 19–13 | Save Mart Center (599); Fresno, CA |
*Non-conference game. ^{#}Rankings from AP Poll. (#) Tournament seedings in parentheses. All times are in Pacific Time.

== See also ==
- 2018–19 Fresno State Bulldogs men's basketball team
