= 2018–19 San Diego State Aztecs women's basketball team =

Intercollegiate basketball season

2018–19 San Diego State Aztecs women's basketball
- Conference: Mountain West Conference
- Record: 14–18 (7–11 Mountain West)
- Head coach: Stacie Terry (6th season)
- Assistant coaches: Kevin Morrison; Ciara Carl; Nick Grant
- Home arena: Viejas Arena

2018–19 Mountain West Conference women's basketball standings
	Conf.				Overall
Team	W		L	PCT	W		L	PCT
Boise State †	16	–	2	.889	28	–	5	.848
New Mexico	14	–	4	.778	24	–	7	.774
Wyoming	13	–	5	.722	25	–	9	.735
Fresno State	11	–	7	.611	19	–	13	.594
Utah State	10	–	8	.556	17	–	15	.531
UNLV	10	–	8	.556	12	–	18	.400
Nevada	7	–	11	.389	12	–	19	.387
San Diego State	7	–	11	.389	14	–	18	.438
San Jose State	5	–	13	.278	6	–	24	.200
Air Force	4	–	14	.222	8	–	22	.267
Colorado State	2	–	16	.111	8	–	22	.267
† 2019 MW tournament winner Rankings from AP poll

The 2018–19 San Diego State Aztecs women's basketball team represented San Diego State University in the 2018–19 NCAA Division I women's basketball season. The Aztecs, led by sixth year head coach Stacie Terry, played their home games at Viejas Arena as members of the Mountain West Conference. They finished the season 14–18, 7–11 in Mountain West play to finish in a tie for seventh place. They advanced to the semifinals of the Mountain West women's tournament, where they lost to Wyoming.

== Roster ==
2018–19 San Diego State Aztecs women's basketball team
Players
Coaches

Pos.	#	Name	Height	Year	Previous school	Hometown
G	0	Kennedi Villa	6 ft 0 in (1.83 m)	So	St. Mary's College HS	Oakland, CA
G	2	Sophia Ramos	5 ft 9 in (1.75 m)	Fr	Incarnate Word HS	San Antonio, TX
G	3	Mallory Adams	6 ft 0 in (1.83 m)	Fr	Lone Star HS	Frisco, TX
F	4	Monique Terry	6 ft 2 in (1.88 m)	Jr	Brennan HS	San Antonio, TX
G	5	Te'a Adams	5 ft 9 in (1.75 m)	So	Juanita HS	Kirkland, WA
G	10	Najé Murray	5 ft 6 in (1.68 m)	So	St. May's HS	Stockton, CA
F	11	Arantxa Gomez Ferrer	6 ft 0 in (1.83 m)	Sr	Parque Colegio Santa Ana HS	Valencia, Spain
G	15	Jayden Perez	5 ft 8 in (1.73 m)	Fr	Onate HS	Las Cruces, NM
C	22	Zayn Dornstauder	6 ft 3 in (1.91 m)	RS Jr	Hamilton HS; Ball State	Regina, SK
G	23	Loli Gomez	5 ft 10 in (1.78 m)	RS Sr	Edison HS; Cal State San Bernardino	Huntington Beach, CA
F	24	Kiara Edwards	6 ft 1 in (1.85 m)	So	Valley Vista HS	Surprise, AZ
G	25	Taylor Kalmer (redshirt)	5 ft 8 in (1.73 m)	Sr	Corona del Sol HS; Oregon State	Chandler, AZ
F	33	Monica Merkovsky	6 ft 1 in (1.85 m)	Sr	West Torrance HS	Torrance, CA
F	34	Baylee Vanderdoes	6 ft 1 in (1.85 m)	Jr	Placer HS	Auburn, CA
C	45	Naomi Ekwedike	6 ft 6 in (1.98 m)	RS So	Potter's House Christian Academy	Lagos, Nigeria

Head coach

- Stacie Terry (UT Arlington)

Assistant coach(es)

- Kevin Morrison (Cal Poly Pomona)
- Ciara Carl (Point Loma)
- Nick Grant (Baylor)

Legend

- (C) Team captain
- (S) Suspended
- (I) Ineligible
- (W) Walk-on
- Injured
- Current redshirt

Roster

== Schedule ==
Date time, TV	Rank^{#}	Opponent^{#}	Result	Record	Site (attendance) city, state
Exhibition
Nov 2, 2018*; 6:30 pm		Biola	W 63–53		Viejas Arena (513); San Diego, CA
Non-conference regular season
Nov 9, 2018*; 11:00 am		Hawaii	W 58–57	1–0	Viejas Arena (2,561); San Diego, CA
Nov 13, 2018*; 3:00 pm		at Santa Clara	L 43–60	1–1	Leavey Center (234); Santa Clara, CA
Nov 15, 2018*; 7:00 pm		at Cal State Fullerton	W 83–72	2–1	Titan Gym (190); Fullerton, CA
Nov 18, 2018*; 1:00 pm		Incarnate Word	W 81–38	3–1	Viejas Arena (1,477); San Diego, CA
Nov 23, 2018*; 5:00 pm		California Baptist; SDSU Thanksgiving Classic	W 83–67	4–1	Viejas Arena (703); San Diego, CA
Nov 24, 2018*; 7:15 pm		TCU; SDSU Thanksgiving Classic	L 64–81	4–2	Viejas Arena (822); San Diego, CA
Nov 28, 2018*; 6:00 pm		at San Diego; City Championship	L 71–72	4–3	Jenny Craig Pavilion (423); San Diego, CA
Dec 2, 2018*; 1:00 pm		Arizona	L 60–69	4–4	Viejas Arena (1,900); San Diego, CA
Dec 7, 2018*; 7:00 pm		at UC Irvine	W 78–70	5–4	Bren Events Center (395); Irvine, CA
Dec 9, 2018*; 4:00 pm		at Cal State Northridge	L 70–77	5–5	Matadome (281); Northridge, CA
Dec 21, 2018*; 1:00 pm		UC Santa Barbara	L 58–63	5–6	Viejas Arena (392); San Diego, CA
Mountain West regular season
Jan 5, 2019; 1:00 pm		Boise State	L 66–69	5–7 (0–1)	Viejas Arena (662); San Diego, CA
Jan 9, 2019; 5:30 pm		at Wyoming	L 45–87	5–8 (0–2)	Arena-Auditorium (2,290); Laramie, WY
Jan 12, 2019; 1:00 pm		Air Force	W 70–61	6–8 (1–2)	Viejas Arena (566); San Diego, CA
Jan 16, 2019; 6:00 pm		at New Mexico	L 62–70	6–9 (1–3)	Dreamstyle Arena (4,976); Albuquerque, NM
Jan 23, 2019; 6:30 pm		Fresno State	L 81–87	6–10 (1–4)	Viejas Arena (465); San Diego, CA
Jan 26, 2019; 3:00 pm		at UNLV	L 57–71	6–11 (1–5)	Thomas & Mack Center (1,069); Paradise, NV
Jan 30, 2019; 6:00 pm		at Air Force	L 66–75	6–12 (1–6)	Clune Arena (337); Colorado Springs, CO
Feb 2, 2019; 1:00 pm		San Jose State	W 69–68	7–12 (2–6)	Viejas Arena (2,869); San Diego, CA
Feb 6, 2019; 11:00 am		New Mexico	W 61–59	8–12 (3–6)	Viejas Arena (4,272); San Diego, CA
Feb 9, 2019; 1:00 pm		at Utah State	W 56–54	9–12 (4–6)	Smith Spectrum (422); Logan, UT
Feb 13, 2019; 6:30 pm		Colorado State	W 54–45	10–12 (5–6)	Viejas Arena (409); San Diego, CA
Feb 16, 2019; 1:00 pm		at Boise State	L 67–91	10–13 (5–7)	Taco Bell Arena (1,875); Boise, ID
Feb 20, 2019; 6:30 pm		at Nevada	L 69–74	10–14 (5–8)	Lawlor Events Center (1,031); Reno, NV
Feb 23, 2019; 1:00 pm		UNLV	L 49–62	10–15 (5–9)	Viejas Arena (966); San Diego, CA
Feb 27, 2019; 6:30 pm		Utah State	L 52–65	10–16 (5–10)	Viejas Arena (447); San Diego, CA
Mar 2, 2019; 2:00 pm		at San Jose State	L 76–84	10–17 (5–11)	Event Center Arena (542); San Jose, CA
Mar 4, 2019; 7:00 pm		at Fresno State	W 59–58	11–17 (6–11)	Save Mart Center (2,208); Fresno, CA
Mar 7, 2019; 5:30 pm		Nevada	W 64–61	12–17 (7–11)	Viejas Arena (602); San Diego, CA
Mountain West Women's Tournament
Mar 10, 2019; 2:00 pm, Stadium	(7)	vs. (10) Air Force; First Round	W 63–55	13–17	Thomas & Mack Center; Paradise, NV
Mar 11, 2019; 5:30 pm, Stadium	(7)	vs. (2) New Mexico; Quarterfinals	W 70–61	14–17	Thomas & Mack Center; Paradise, NV
Mar 12, 2019; 8:30 pm, Stadium	(7)	vs. (3) Wyoming; Semifinals	L 70–75 ^{OT}	14–18	Thomas & Mack Center (1,934); Paradise, NV
*Non-conference game. ^{#}Rankings from AP Poll. (#) Tournament seedings in parentheses. All times are in Pacific Time.

== See also ==
2018–19 San Diego State Aztecs men's basketball team
