= 2018–19 UNLV Lady Rebels basketball team =

Intercollegiate basketball season

2018–19 UNLV Lady Rebels basketball
- Conference: Mountain West Conference
- Record: 12–18 (10–8 Mountain West)
- Head coach: Kathy Olivier (11th season)
- Assistant coaches: Caitlin Collier; Mia Bell; Brandon Morrison
- Home arena: Cox Pavilion; Thomas & Mack Center

2018–19 Mountain West Conference women's basketball standings
	Conf.				Overall
Team	W		L	PCT	W		L	PCT
Boise State †	16	–	2	.889	28	–	5	.848
New Mexico	14	–	4	.778	24	–	7	.774
Wyoming	13	–	5	.722	25	–	9	.735
Fresno State	11	–	7	.611	19	–	13	.594
Utah State	10	–	8	.556	17	–	15	.531
UNLV	10	–	8	.556	12	–	18	.400
Nevada	7	–	11	.389	12	–	19	.387
San Diego State	7	–	11	.389	14	–	18	.438
San Jose State	5	–	13	.278	6	–	24	.200
Air Force	4	–	14	.222	8	–	22	.267
Colorado State	2	–	16	.111	8	–	22	.267
† 2019 MW tournament winner Rankings from AP poll

The 2018–19 UNLV Lady Rebels basketball team represented the University of Nevada, Las Vegas during the 2018–19 NCAA Division I women's basketball season. The Lady Rebels, led by eleventh year head coach Kathy Olivier, played their home games at the Cox Pavilion, attached to the Thomas & Mack Center on UNLV's main campus in Paradise, Nevada. They were a member of the Mountain West Conference. They finished the season 12–18, 10–8 in Mountain West play to finish in a tie for fifth place. They lost in the quarterfinals Mountain West women's tournament to Fresno State.

== Roster ==
2018–19 UNLV Lady Rebels women's basketball team
Players
Coaches

Pos.	#	Name	Height	Year	Previous school	Hometown
G	0	LaTecia Smith	5 ft 6 in (1.68 m)	RS Jr	Narbonne HS; Seton Hall	Gardenia, CA
G	1	Kavionnia Brown	5 ft 3 in (1.6 m)	RS Fr	Cibola HS	Albuquerque, NM
G	2	Kambrayia Elzy	5 ft 7 in (1.7 m)	Fr	Mission Oak HS	Tulare, CA
F	3	Paris Strawther	6 ft 2 in (1.88 m)	Sr	Liberty HS	Las Vegas, NV
G	5	Mara Kemmer	5 ft 7 in (1.7 m)	Jr	Desert Vista HS	Phoenix, AZ
F	10	Nikki Wheatley	5 ft 5 in (1.65 m)	RS Sr	Bonita HS	La Verne, CA
G	11	Jusice Ethridge	5 ft 9 in (1.75 m)	Fr	Centennial HS	Las Vegas, NV
G	14	Bailey Thomas	5 ft 9 in (1.75 m)	RS So	Marian HS; West Virginia	Las Vegas, NV
F	20	Alyssa Anderson	6 ft 0 in (1.83 m)	RS Sr	Etiwanda HS	Ranch Cucamonga, CA
C	21	Katie Powell	6 ft 4 in (1.93 m)	RS Sr	Duluth HS; Arkansas	Duluth, GA
F/C	22	Destiney Lee	6 ft 2 in (1.88 m)	Sr	C. K. McClatchy HS	Sacramento, CA
F	23	Jordyn Bell	6 ft 1 in (1.85 m)	Sr	Bradshaw Christian HS	Elk Grove, CA
C	24	Rodjanae Wade	6 ft 2 in (1.88 m)	Jr	Edison HS	Fresno, CA
C	25	Krista Jackman	6 ft 5 in (1.96 m)	So	River Valley HS	Mohave Valley, AZ
C	43	Haley Bodnar Rydalch	6 ft 3 in (1.91 m)	RS Sr	Desert Hills HS; BYU	St. George, UT

Head coach

- Kathy Olivier (UNLV)

Assistant coach(es)

- Caitlin Collier (UC Davis)
- Mia Bell (UNLV)
- Brandon Morrison (Miami (FL))

Legend

- (C) Team captain
- (S) Suspended
- (I) Ineligible
- (W) Walk-on
- Injured
- Current redshirt

Roster

== Schedule ==
Date time, TV	Rank^{#}	Opponent^{#}	Result	Record	Site (attendance) city, state
Non-conference regular season
Nov 9, 2018*; 6:00 pm		Wright State	L 52–68	0–1	Cox Pavilion (1,121); Paradise, NV
Nov 13, 2018*; 5:00 pm		at UC Irvine	L 55–57	0–2	Bren Events Center (284); Irvine, CA
Nov 17, 2018*; 3:00 pm		Gonzaga	L 59–70	0–3	Cox Pavilion (1,373); Paradise, NV
Nov 24, 2018*; 12:00 pm		UC Santa Barbara; Lady Rebel Round-Up semifinals	W 69–51	1–3	Cox Pavilion; Paradise, NV
Nov 25, 2018*; 2:30 pm		Middle Tennessee; Lady Rebel Round-Up championship	L 62–66	1–4	Cox Pavilion (754); Paradise, NV
Dec 1, 2018*; 5:00 pm		USC	L 72–86	1–5	Cox Pavilion (1,579); Paradise, NV
Dec 6, 2018*; 4:00 pm, ACCNE		at Duke	L 38–66	1–6	Cameron Indoor Stadium (3,018); Durham, NC
Dec 8, 2018*; 11:00 am		at South Carolina State	L 49–58	1–7	SHM Memorial Center (123); Orangeburg, NC
Dec 15, 2018*; 2:00 pm		at Portland State	L 49–58	1–8	Viking Pavilion (413); Portland, OR
Dec 19, 2018*; 12:00 pm		Hawaii; Duel in the Desert Rebel Division semifinals	L 61–66	1–9	Cox Pavilion; Paradise, NV
Dec 21, 2018*; 12:00 pm		Florida; Duel in the Desert Rebel Division 3rd place game	W 56–53	2–9	Cox Pavilion; Paradise, NV
Mountain West regular season
Jan 3, 2019; 6:00 pm		at Colorado State	L 49–52	2–10 (0–1)	Moby Arena (987); Fort Collins, CO
Jan 5, 2019; 1:00 pm		at Wyoming	L 62–90	2–11 (0–2)	Arena-Auditorium (3,879); Laramie, WY
Jan 9, 2019; 6:00 pm		New Mexico	W 66–57	3–11 (1–2)	Cox Pavilion (774); Paradise, NV
Jan 16, 2019; 12:00 pm		Air Force	W 66–56	4–11 (2–2)	Thomas & Mack Center (3,149); Paradise, NV
Jan 19, 2019; 2:00 pm		at San Jose State	W 53–43	5–11 (3–2)	Event Center Arena (514); San Jose, CA
Jan 23, 2019; 6:00 pm		at New Mexico	L 77–80 ^{OT}	5–12 (3–3)	Dreamstyle Arena (5,009); Albuquerque, NM
Jan 26, 2019; 3:00 pm		San Diego State	W 71–57	6–12 (4–3)	Thomas & Mack Center (1,069); Paradise, NV
Jan 30, 2019; 6:30 pm		at Nevada	L 62–70	6–13 (4–4)	Lawlor Events Center (1,371); Reno, NV
Feb 2, 2019; 2:00 pm		Utah State	W 77–56	7–13 (5–4)	Cox Pavilion (1,247); Paradise, NV
Feb 6, 2019; 6:00 pm		Boise State	L 57–64	7–14 (5–5)	Cox Pavilion (1,003); Paradise, NV
Feb 9, 2019; 2:00 pm		at Fresno State	L 55–73	7–15 (5–6)	Save Mart Center (2,294); Fresno, CA
Feb 13, 2019; 6:00 pm		at Air Force	W 62–47	8–15 (6–6)	Clune Arena (523); Colorado Springs, CO
Feb 16, 2019; 2:00 pm		San Jose State	W 74–70	9–15 (7–6)	Cox Pavilion (1,090); Paradise, NV
Feb 20, 2019; 6:00 pm		Wyoming	L 49–64	9–16 (7–7)	Cox Pavilion (782); Paradise, NV
Feb 23, 2019; 1:00 pm		at San Diego State	W 62–49	10–16 (8–7)	Viejas Arena (966); San Diego, CA
Feb 27, 2019; 6:00 pm		Nevada	W 67–58	11–16 (9–7)	Cox Pavilion (1,109); Paradise, NV
Mar 2, 2019; 1:00 pm		at Boise State	L 38–53	11–17 (9–8)	Taco Bell Arena (1,339); Boise, ID
Mar 7, 2019; 6:00 pm		Colorado State	L 45–60	12–17 (10–8)	Cox Pavilion (1,402); Paradise, NV
Mountain West Women's Tournament
Mar 11, 2019; 2:30 pm, Stadium	(5)	vs. (4) Fresno State; Quarterfinals	L 55–66	12–18	Thomas & Mack Center (1,448); Paradise, NV
*Non-conference game. ^{#}Rankings from AP Poll. (#) Tournament seedings in parentheses. All times are in Pacific Time.

== See also ==
2018–19 UNLV Runnin' Rebels basketball team
