= 2019 Mountain West Conference women's basketball tournament =

- Classification: Division I
- Season: 2018–19
- Teams: 11
- Site: Thomas & Mack Center; Paradise, NV
- Champions: Boise State (4th title)
- Winning coach: Gordy Presnell (4th title)
- MVP: Braydey Hodgins (Boise State)
- Attendance: 9,174
- Television: Stadium, CBSSN

2018–19 Mountain West Conference women's basketball standings
	Conf.				Overall
Team	W		L	PCT	W		L	PCT
Boise State †	16	–	2	.889	28	–	5	.848
New Mexico	14	–	4	.778	24	–	7	.774
Wyoming	13	–	5	.722	25	–	9	.735
Fresno State	11	–	7	.611	19	–	13	.594
Utah State	10	–	8	.556	17	–	15	.531
UNLV	10	–	8	.556	12	–	18	.400
Nevada	7	–	11	.389	12	–	19	.387
San Diego State	7	–	11	.389	14	–	18	.438
San Jose State	5	–	13	.278	6	–	24	.200
Air Force	4	–	14	.222	8	–	22	.267
Colorado State	2	–	16	.111	8	–	22	.267
† 2019 MW tournament winner Rankings from AP poll

The 2019 Mountain West Conference women's basketball tournament was held March 10–13, 2019 at the Thomas & Mack Center on the campus of University of Nevada, Las Vegas, in Las Vegas, Nevada. Boise State won the tournament and received an automatic bid to the 2019 NCAA tournament.

== Seeds ==
Teams are seeded by conference record, with a ties broken by record between the tied teams followed by record against the regular-season champion, if necessary.

Seed	School	Conf	Tiebreaker
#1	Boise State	16–2	
#2	New Mexico	14–4	
#3	Wyoming	13–5	
#4	Fresno State	11–7	
#5	UNLV	10–8	1–0 vs. USU
#6	Utah State	10–8	0–1 vs. UNLV
#7	San Diego State	7–11	1–0 vs. USU
#8	Nevada	7–11	0–2 vs. USU
#9	San Jose State	5–13	
#10	Air Force	4–14	
#11	Colorado State	2–16	

== Schedule ==
Session	Game	Time*	Matchup^{#}	Television	Attendance
First Round – Sunday, March 10
1	1	2:00 PM	#8 Nevada vs. #9 San Jose State	Stadium	1,550
1	2	4:30 PM	#7 San Diego State vs. #10 Air Force	Stadium	1,550
1	3	7:00 PM	#6 Utah State vs. #11 Colorado State	Stadium	1,550
Quarterfinals – Monday, March 11
2	4	12:00 PM	#1 Boise State vs. #8 Nevada	Stadium	1,448
2	5	2:30 PM	#4 Fresno State vs. #5 UNLV	Stadium	1,448
3	6	5:30 PM	#2 New Mexico vs. #7 San Diego State	Stadium	2,231
3	7	8:00 PM	#3 Wyoming vs. #6 Utah State	Stadium	2,231
Semifinals – Tuesday, March 12
4	8	6:00 PM	#1 Boise State vs. #4 Fresno State	Stadium	1,934
4	9	8:30 PM	#7 San Diego State vs. #3 Wyoming	Stadium	1,934
Championship Game – Wednesday, March 13
5	10	7:00 PM	#1 Boise State vs. #3 Wyoming	CBSSN	2,011
*Game Times in PT.

== Bracket ==
First round Sunday, March 10
8	Nevada	78
9	San Jose State	68
7	San Diego State	63
10	Air Force	55
6	Utah State	62
11	Colorado State	59

Quarterfinals; Monday, March 11
1	Boise State	72
8	Nevada	67
4	Fresno State	66
5	UNLV	55
2	New Mexico	61
7	San Diego State	70
3	Wyoming	64
6	Utah State	41

Semifinals; Tuesday, March 12
1	Boise State	89
4	Fresno State	77
7	San Diego State	70
3	Wyoming	75*

Championship; Wednesday, March 13
1	Boise State	68
3	Wyoming	51

* denotes overtime period

== See also ==
- 2019 Mountain West Conference men's basketball tournament
