= Per Holten Møller =

Danish ice hockey player and coach

- Born: 30 August 1952 (age 72); Hørsholm, Denmark
- Position: Defenceman
- Played for: Denmark; Rungsted Ishockey Klub
- National team: Denmark
- Playing career: 1967–1985

Per Holten Møller (born 30 August 1952) is a Danish former ice hockey player. He is currently the head coach Copenhagen Hockey.

From 1970 to 1984 he played 159 matches for Denmark men's national ice hockey team. In the period 1989 to 1994 he was the coach of the national team.

Today Per Holten Møller is a teacher on Vallerødskolen in Hørsholm, Denmark, where he teaches subjects like math, P.E. and history. He is married and has two children.
