= List of major liberal parties considered right =

Liberalism is frequently associated with centrism; however, in some regions, including Australia, Brazil, and New Zealand, liberalism may be linked to conservatism, right-leaning, or centre-right politics; in this case, liberals may represent the "bourgeois camp" and be the main opponents of socialists or social democrats. There are also liberal parties involved in right-wing politics in many parts of the world.

== Active ==
=== Major parties ===
Country	Party	Abbr.	Notes	Ref.
Australia	Liberal Party of Australia	LPC	Two-party system dominated by the Liberal Party and the social-democratic Labor Party.	
Ghana	New Patriotic Party	LPC	Two-party system dominated by the liberal New Patriotic Party and the social-democratic National Democratic Congress.	
Moldova	Party of Action and Solidarity	PAS	Multi-party system dominated by the liberal PAS and the socialist PSRM and its affiliates.	
Mongolia	Democratic Party	DP, АН	Two-party system dominated by the liberal Democratic Party and the social-democratic Mongolian People's Party.	
New Zealand	New Zealand National Party	Nats	Multi-party system dominated primarily by the liberal National Party and the social-democratic Labour Party.	
Nicaragua	Constitutionalist Liberal Party	PLC	Dominant-party system under the socialist FSLN. The liberal PLC is one of the main opposition parties.	
South Africa	Democratic Alliance	DA	Dominant-party system under the social-democratic ANC. The liberal DA is one of the main opposition parties.	

=== Other ===
- Australia: Liberal Democratic Party (Note: The party is still active but changed its 2023 name from the "Liberal Democratic Party" to the "Libertarian Party".)
- Belgium: Open Flemish Liberals and Democrats, Reformist Movement
- Brazil: Cidadania, New Party
- Chile: Evópoli
- Denmark: Venstre, Liberal Alliance
- Estonia: Estonian Reform Party
- France: Democratic Movement, Renaissance, Union of Democrats and Independents
- Germany: Free Democratic Party
- Haiti: Haitian Tèt Kale Party
- Ireland: Fine Gael
- Italy: Forza Italia (2013)
- Lithuania: Liberals' Movement
- Moldova: Liberal Democratic Party of Moldova, Liberal Party
- Netherlands: People's Party for Freedom and Democracy
- New Zealand: ACT New Zealand
- Nicaragua: Nicaraguan Liberal Alliance, Independent Liberal Party
- Norway: Progress Party
- Peru: Go on Country – Social Integration Party
- Portugal: Social Democratic Party, Liberal Initiative
- Romania: National Liberal Party
- Russia: New People
- Spain: Citizens
- Sweden: Centre Party, Liberals
- Switzerland: FDP.The Liberals/LRP.The Liberal-Radicals
- Ukraine: Holos
- Venezuela: Vente Venezuela

The liberal Progressive Slovakia (PS) is considered right-leaning in that it is the main opposition party to the left-wing nationalist Direction – Social Democracy (Smer). By international standards, PS is referred to as the centre-left.

== Historical ==
Only liberal parties that existed since 1945 are included.

- Brazil: Liberal Party (1985)
- France: Union for French Democracy
- Italy: Forza Italia (1994), Italian Liberal Party, The People of Freedom
- Lithuania: Liberal and Centre Union
- New Zealand: New Zealand Party
- Spain: Democratic Convergence of Catalonia

== List of liberal political coalitions considered right ==
=== Active ===
- Argentina: Juntos por el Cambio
- Bulgaria: Democratic Bulgaria
- France: Ensemble

The Civic Coalition (KO), a Polish liberal party, is considered left-leaning in that it is the main opposition party to the conservative United Right (ZP). By international standards, KO is referred to as the centre-right.

=== Historical ===
- Bulgaria: Blue Coalition, Reformist Bloc
- Moldova: Alliance for European Integration
- Romania: Right Romania Alliance, United Right Alliance

== Right-wing to far-right conservative parties using the party name "Liberal" ==
Some related terms like libertarianism (representing economic liberalism, neoliberalism, and right-libertarianism in what otherwise is called classical liberalism and libertarianism in the United States) are usually associated with right-wing politics. Similarly, conservative parties in South Korea usually use variation of Jayu (Korean: 자유; lit. '"liberal", "freedom", or "liberty"'), which might be translated as "liberal". These political parties have "Liberal" in their party names but most of them deviate from the general liberal principles.

=== Active ===
- Austria: Freedom Party of Austria (Note: Instead of "liberal", the party the related term freiheitlich, which originating from the national liberal Deutschfreiheitlichkeit movement. Liberal factions were present in the current party until the 1980s.)
- Belarus: Liberal Democratic Party of Belarus
- Brazil: Liberal Party (2006)
- Israel: Likud – National Liberal Movement
- Japan: Liberal Democratic Party
- Russia: Liberal Democratic Party of Russia
- Serbia: Serbian Radical Party (Note: While the SRS does not call themselves liberal, its name originates from the People's Radical Party, a classical radical party.)

=== Historical ===
- Japan: Liberal Party (1945), Liberal Party (1950)
- Nicaragua: Nationalist Liberal Party
- Russia: Liberal Democratic Party of the Soviet Union (after 1990)
- South Korea: Liberal Party (1951), Democratic Liberal Party

== See also ==
See also
- Liberal conservatism#Liberal-conservative parties or parties with liberal-conservative factions
- Liberalism
  - Classical liberalism
  - Conservative liberalism
- Liberalism by country [in the modern era]
  - Historical liberalism in New Zealand
  - Liberalism and radicalism in France
  - Liberalism and radicalism in Italy (Liberism)
  - Liberalism in Australia
  - Liberalism in Brazil
- Liberalism in Europe, usually the political position of centre to centre-right.
  - Renew Europe
- Libertarianism
  - Right-libertarianism
- List of Liberal Democratic parties
