= 2018–19 Nevada Wolf Pack women's basketball team =

Intercollegiate basketball season

2018–19 Nevada Wolf Pack women's basketball
- Conference: Mountain West Conference
- Record: 12–19 (7–11 MW)
- Head coach: Amanda Levens (2nd season)
- Assistant coaches: Laura Gonsalves; Shannon Gholar; Sybil Dosty
- Home arena: Lawlor Events Center

2018–19 Mountain West Conference women's basketball standings
	Conf.				Overall
Team	W		L	PCT	W		L	PCT
Boise State †	16	–	2	.889	28	–	5	.848
New Mexico	14	–	4	.778	24	–	7	.774
Wyoming	13	–	5	.722	25	–	9	.735
Fresno State	11	–	7	.611	19	–	13	.594
Utah State	10	–	8	.556	17	–	15	.531
UNLV	10	–	8	.556	12	–	18	.400
Nevada	7	–	11	.389	12	–	19	.387
San Diego State	7	–	11	.389	14	–	18	.438
San Jose State	5	–	13	.278	6	–	24	.200
Air Force	4	–	14	.222	8	–	22	.267
Colorado State	2	–	16	.111	8	–	22	.267
† 2019 MW tournament winner Rankings from AP poll

The 2018–19 Nevada Wolf Pack women's basketball team represented the University of Nevada, Reno during the 2018–19 NCAA Division I women's basketball season. The Wolf Pack, led by second year head coach Amanda Levens, played their home games at the Lawlor Events Center and were members of the Mountain West Conference. They finished the season 12–19, 7–11 in Mountain West play to finish in a tie for seventh place. They advanced to the quarterfinals of the Mountain West women's tournament, where they lost to Boise State.

== Roster ==
2018–19 Nevada Wolf Pack women's basketball team
Players
Coaches

Pos.	#	Name	Height	Year	Previous school	Hometown
G	2	Da'Ja Hamilton	5 ft 8 in (1.73 m)	Fr	Etiwanda HS	Rancho Cucamonga, CA
G	3	Essence Booker	5 ft 8 in (1.73 m)	Fr	Spring Valley HS	Las Vegas, NV
G	5	Mikayla Christian	5 ft 10 in (1.78 m)	Jr	Vista Ridge HS; TCU	Round Rock, TX
G	13	Amaya West	5 ft 10 in (1.78 m)	Fr	Red Mountain HS	Mesa, AZ
G	14	Delaney Gosse	6 ft 1 in (1.85 m)	RS Jr	The Meadows School	Las Vegas, NV
F	15	Emma Torbert	6 ft 2 in (1.88 m)	Fr	Mater Dei HS	Dana Point, CA
F	21	Imani Lacy	6 ft 0 in (1.83 m)	Fr	Central HS	Fresno, CA
G	22	Sami Dinan	5 ft 5 in (1.65 m)	Jr	North Valleys HS	Reno, NV
F	23	Terae Briggs	6 ft 3 in (1.91 m)	Sr	Pleanty Coups HS; United Tribes Technical College	Pryor, MT
G	24	Camariah King	5 ft 6 in (1.68 m)	RS Jr	Holy Names Academy	Seattle, WA
G	34	Jade Redmon	5 ft 7 in (1.7 m)	RS Sr	Mead HS; Eastern Washington	Spokane, WA
F	35	Kristin Dearth	6 ft 3 in (1.91 m)	RS Jr	Cibola; Seattle	Corrales, NM
F	51	Kaelei Koenig	5 ft 10 in (1.78 m)	Fr	McQueen HS	Reno, NV

Head coach

- Amanda Levens (Arizona State)

Assistant coach(es)

- Laura Gonsalves (Washington)
- Shannon Gholar (Cal Poly)
- Sybil Dosty (Arizona State)

Legend

- (C) Team captain
- (S) Suspended
- (I) Ineligible
- (W) Walk-on
- Injured
- Current redshirt

Roster

== Schedule ==
Date time, TV	Rank^{#}	Opponent^{#}	Result	Record	Site (attendance) city, state
Non-conference regular season
Nov 7, 2018*; 6:30 pm, Stadium		Utah	L 52–74	0–1	Lawlor Events Center (1,227); Reno, NV
Nov 10, 2018*; 4:00 pm		at Santa Clara	L 48–56	0–2	Leavey Center (381); Santa Clara, CA
Nov 18, 2018*; 4:00 pm		at Long Beach State	W 76–67	1–2	Walter Pyramid (618); Long Beach, CA
Nov 23, 2018*; 2:00 pm, Stadium		Colorado; Nugget Classic	L 52–65	1–3	Lawlor Events Center (1,070); Reno, NV
Nov 25, 2018*; 2:00 pm, Stadium		USC; Nugget Classic	L 51–72	1–4	Lawlor Events Center (982); Reno, NV
Dec 1, 2018*; 11:00 am		vs. UC Davis; 38th Lady Griz Classic semifinals	L 68–84	1–5	Dahlberg Arena (427); Missoula, MT
Dec 2, 2018*; 11:00 am		vs. Northern Illinois; 38th Lady Griz Classic 3rd place game	L 69–98	1–6	Dahlberg Arena (301); Missoula, MT
Dec 11, 2018*; 11:00 am		Stanislaus State	W 75–52	2–6	Lawlor Events Center (4,036); Reno, NV
Dec 15, 2018*; 1:00 pm		Texas Tech	L 67–86	2–7	Lawlor Events Center (1,368); Reno, NV
Dec 20, 2018*; 6:30 pm		Seattle	W 67–54	3–7	Lawlor Events Center (864); Reno, NV
Dec 29, 2018*; 2:00 pm		Hawaii	W 79–78 ^{OT}	4–7	Lawlor Events Center (1,010); Reno, NV
Mountain West regular season
Jan 2, 2019; 6:00 pm		at Utah State	L 76–79 ^{2OT}	4–8 (0–1)	Smith Spectrum (247); Logan, UT
Jan 5, 2019; 2:00 pm, Stadium		New Mexico	L 64–66	4–9 (0–2)	Lawlor Events Center (1,058); Reno, NV
Jan 9, 2019; 7:00 pm		at San Jose State	W 52–49	5–9 (1–2)	Event Center Arena (408); San Jose, CA
Jan 12, 2019; 2:00 pm		Fresno State	L 63–79	5–10 (1–3)	Lawlor Events Center (1,021); Reno, NV
Jan 16, 2019; 6:30 pm		Boise State	L 74–75	5–11 (1–4)	Lawlor Events Center (872); Reno, NV
Jan 19, 2019; 1:00 pm		at Air Force	L 74–79 ^{OT}	5–12 (1–5)	Clune Arena (747); Colorado Springs, CO
Jan 23, 2019; 6:00 pm		at Colorado State	W 62–38	6–12 (2–5)	Moby Arena (955); Fort Collins, CO
Jan 30, 2019; 6:30 pm		UNLV	W 70–62	7–12 (3–5)	Lawlor Events Center (1,371); Reno, NV
Feb 1, 2019; 1:00 pm		at Boise State	L 65–80	7–13 (3–6)	Taco Bell Arena (1,627); Boise, ID
Feb 6, 2019; 6:30 pm		Colorado State	W 68–57	8–13 (4–6)	Lawlor Events Center (1,125); Reno, NV
Feb 9, 2019; 12:00 pm		at New Mexico	L 74–85	8–14 (4–7)	Dreamstyle Arena (6,316); Albuquerque, NM
Feb 16, 2019; 2:00 pm		Wyoming	L 51–55	8–15 (4–8)	Lawlor Events Center (2,371); Reno, NV
Feb 20, 2019; 6:30 pm		San Diego State	W 74–69	9–15 (5–8)	Lawlor Events Center (1,031); Reno, NV
Feb 23, 2019; 2:00 pm		at Fresno State	W 57–41	10–15 (6–8)	Save Mart Center (2,555); Fresno, CA
Feb 27, 2019; 6:00 pm		at UNLV	L 58–67	10–16 (6–9)	Cox Pavilion (1,109); Paradise, NV
Mar 2, 2019; 1:00 pm		Utah State	L 59–71	10–17 (6–10)	Lawlor Events Center (1,131); Reno, NV
Mar 4, 2019; 6:30 pm		Air Force	W 79–54	11–17 (7–10)	Lawlor Events Center (978); Reno, NV
Mar 7, 2019; 5:30 pm		at San Diego State	L 61–64	11–18 (7–11)	Viejas Arena (602); San Diego, CA
Mountain West Women's Tournament
Mar 10, 2019; 4:30 pm, Stadium	(8)	vs. (9) San Jose State; First Round	W 78–68	12–18	Thomas & Mack Center; Paradise, NV
Mar 11, 2019; 12:00 pm, Stadium	(8)	vs. (1) Boise State; Quarterfinals	L 67–72	12–19	Thomas & Mack Center; Paradise, NV
*Non-conference game. ^{#}Rankings from AP Poll. (#) Tournament seedings in parentheses. All times are in Pacific Time.

== See also ==
- 2018–19 Nevada Wolf Pack men's basketball team
