= Hørsholm Textile Factory =

Former textile mill in Hørsholm, Denmark

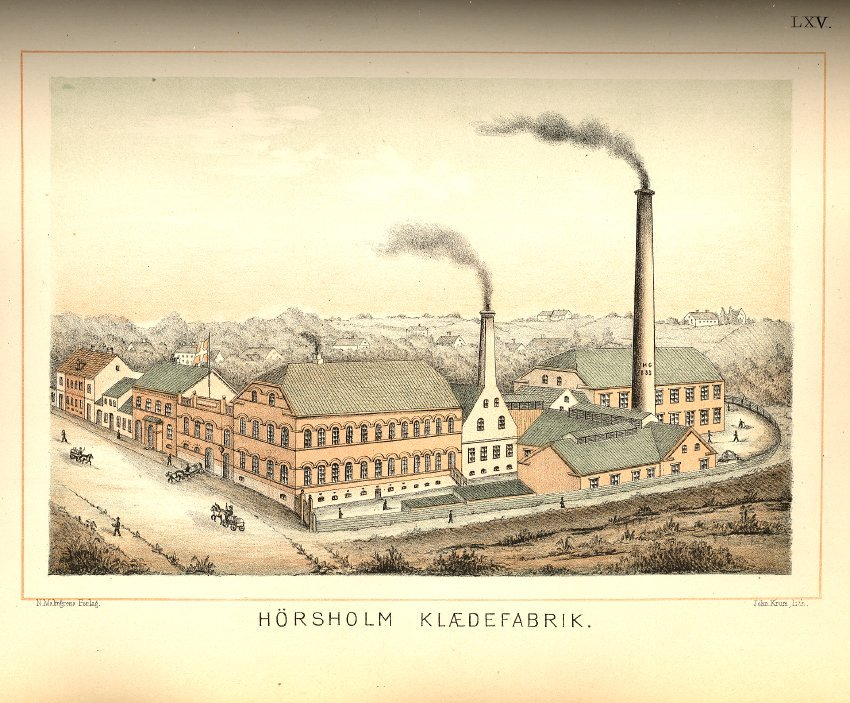
Hørsholm Textile Factory

Hørsholm Textile Factory (Danish: Hørsholm Klædefabrik) was a textile mill in Hørsholm, Denmark. The oldest part of the buildings can still be seen at Hovedgaden 51 and have now been converted into office space.

== History ==
Hørsholm Klædefabrik was founded by Jørgen Heinrich Lindloff on 23 July 1842 and was then operated by horse power. It was expanded in connection with the introduction of steam engines in 1874. It won a gold medal at the 1888 Nordic Exhibition in Copenhagen. 120 workers was employed at the factory in 1940. It closed in 1968.

== Legacy ==
The oldest part of the buildings can still be seen at Hovedgaden 51 and have now been converted into office space. The rest of the buildings were demolished shortly after the factory closed in 1976. The Trommen library and Cpdan Building were built in the grounds in 1986–88.

== See also ==
Usserød Textile Factory
