= Bürgerblock-Regierung =

Political term for a German governing coalition

The German term Bürgerblock-Regierung (in English: bourgeois bloc administration) denotes a government coalition in the German Weimar Republic. It consisted of the German Democratic Party, the Centre Party, the Bavarian People's Party, the German People's Party, and the German National People's Party (or at least most of these parties). On 15 January 1925, the first occurrence of this coalition (led by Hans Luther) came into effect. On 29 January 1927, Wilhelm Marx's cabinet brought the second occurrence of such a combination. In the Federal Republic of Germany, the CDU/CSU and FDP coalitions are sometimes rarely referred to with this term. The usual denotation is "centre-right government" or "bourgeois government" (in German: bürgerliche Regierung) because the SPD is not part of this combination.

== See also ==
- Bourgeois party
