= 2018–19 San Jose State Spartans women's basketball team =

Intercollegiate basketball season

2018–19 San Jose State Spartans women's basketball
- Conference: Mountain West Conference
- Record: 6–24 (5–13 Mountain West)
- Head coach: Jamie Craighead (6th season)
- Assistant coaches: Alle Moreno; Carlotta Kloppenburg; Ari Wideman
- Home arena: Event Center Arena

2018–19 Mountain West Conference women's basketball standings
	Conf.				Overall
Team	W		L	PCT	W		L	PCT
Boise State †	16	–	2	.889	28	–	5	.848
New Mexico	14	–	4	.778	24	–	7	.774
Wyoming	13	–	5	.722	25	–	9	.735
Fresno State	11	–	7	.611	19	–	13	.594
Utah State	10	–	8	.556	17	–	15	.531
UNLV	10	–	8	.556	12	–	18	.400
Nevada	7	–	11	.389	12	–	19	.387
San Diego State	7	–	11	.389	14	–	18	.438
San Jose State	5	–	13	.278	6	–	24	.200
Air Force	4	–	14	.222	8	–	22	.267
Colorado State	2	–	16	.111	8	–	22	.267
† 2019 MW tournament winner Rankings from AP poll

The 2018–19 San Jose State Spartans women's basketball team represented San Jose State University in the 2018–19 NCAA Division I women's basketball season. The Spartans were led by sixth-year head coach Jamie Craighead and played home games at the Event Center Arena as a member of the Mountain West Conference. They finished the season 6–24, 5–13 in Mountain West play to finish in ninth place. They lost in the first round of the Mountain West women's tournament to Nevada.

== Roster ==
2018–19 San Jose State Spartans women's basketball team
Players
Coaches

Pos.	#	Name	Height	Year	Previous school	Hometown
G	0	Raziya Potter	6 ft 0 in (1.83 m)	Fr	Kimball HS	Tracy, CA
G	1	Nefer Leon	5 ft 5 in (1.65 m)	Fr	Olabide ikastola	Vitoria, Spain
F	2	Andrea Kohlhaas	5 ft 11 in (1.8 m)	Sr	Otto-Hahn HS	Besigheim, Germany
G	3	Ayzhiana Basallo (redshirt)	5 ft 5 in (1.65 m)	So	St. Ignatius Prep; Cal Poly	San Francisco, CA
G	4	Fa-Ko-Fieme'a Hafoka	5 ft 9 in (1.75 m)	Jr	Lahainaluna HS	Kihei, HI
G	5	Analyss Benally	5 ft 8 in (1.73 m)	Jr	Wichita Heights HS	Park City, KS
F	12	Anna Thomasdotter	6 ft 0 in (1.83 m)	RS So	Lund Cathedral HS	Lund, Sweden
G	22	Danae Marquez	5 ft 5 in (1.65 m)	So	Clovis West HS	Fresno, CA
F	23	Miyah Lewis-Hampton	5 ft 11 in (1.8 m)	Fr	Leadership HS	San Francisco, CA
C	24	Alexis Harris	6 ft 3 in (1.91 m)	Jr	Palo Alto HS	Palo Alto, CA
G/F	30	Megan Anderson	6 ft 0 in (1.83 m)	So	Clovis West HS	Fresno, CA
F	32	Mikaylah Wilson	5 ft 10 in (1.78 m)	So	Etiwanda HS	Rancho Cucamonga, CA
G	33	Courtesy Clark	5 ft 10 in (1.78 m)	So	McClatchy HS	Sacramento, CA
F	35	Cydni Lewis	6 ft 0 in (1.83 m)	So	Mater Dei HS	Long Beach, CA

Head coach

- Jamie Craighead (Oregon)

Assistant coach(es)

- Alle Moreno (Sacramento State)
- Carlotta Kloppenburg (Point Loma Nazarene)
- Ari Wideman (Nevada)

Legend

- (C) Team captain
- (S) Suspended
- (I) Ineligible
- (W) Walk-on
- Injured
- Current redshirt

Roster

== Schedule ==
Date time, TV	Rank^{#}	Opponent^{#}	Result	Record	High points	High rebounds	High assists	Site (attendance) city, state
Exhibition
Oct 28, 2018*; 2:00 pm		Chico State	W 94–63		–	–	–	Event Center Arena; San Jose, CA
Non-conference regular season
Nov 6, 2018*; 7:00 pm		San Francisco State	L 66–73	0–1	14 – Lewis	7 – Marquez	4 – 2 tied	Event Center Arena (320); San Jose, CA
Nov 9, 2018*; 7:00 pm		at San Francisco	L 63–85	0–2	14 – Benally	4 – 4 tied	5 – Marquez	War Memorial Gymnasium (640); San Francisco, CA
Nov 11, 2018*; 2:00 pm		at Portland State	L 51–80	0–3	14 – Wilson	5 – 2 tied	5 – Marquez	Viking Pavilion (377); San Francisco, CA
Nov 24, 2018*; 12:00 pm		Cal State Bakersfield	W 82–72	1–3	14 – Hafoka	8 – Marquez	8 – Marquez	Event Center Arena (805); San Jose, CA
Nov 29, 2018*; 7:00 pm		Pacific	L 67–91	1–4	17 – Hafoka	8 – Lewis	6 – Marquez	Event Center Arena (334); San Jose, CA
Dec 2, 2018*; 2:00 pm		UC Irvine	L 66–74	1–5	17 – Potter	11 – Lewis	5 – Potter	Event Center Arena (338); San Jose, CA
Dec 6, 2018*; 6:00 pm		at Colorado	L 64–76	1–6	18 – Lewis	8 – Marquez	6 – Marquez	CU Events Center (1,238); Boulder, CO
Dec 8, 2018*; 10:00 am		at Nebraska	L 63–96	1–7	15 – Lewis	9 – Lewis	4 – Hafoka	Pinnacle Bank Arena (3,601); Lincoln, NE
Dec 15, 2018*; 4:00 pm		Santa Clara	L 56–62	1–8	17 – Hafoka	9 – Potter	6 – 2 tied	Event Center Arena (474); San Jose, CA
Dec 19, 2018*; 7:00 pm		at Cal State Northridge	L 40–76	1–9	11 – Benally	6 – Lewis	2 – 2 tied	Matadome (338); Northridge, CA
Dec 21, 2018*; 5:00 pm		at San Diego	L 79–83	1–10	15 – Potter	6 – Lewis	7 – Marquez	Jenny Craig Pavilion (321); San Diego, CA
Mountain West regular season
Jan 2, 2019; 7:00 pm		at Fresno State	L 48–77	1–11 (0–1)	11 – Lewis	6 – Lewis	2 – 2 tied	Save Mart Center (2,080); Fresno, CA
Jan 9, 2019; 7:00 pm		Nevada	L 49–52	1–12 (0–2)	13 – Hafoka	5 – Hafoka	3 – 2 tied	Event Center Arena (408); San Jose, CA
Jan 12, 2019; 12:00 pm		at Boise State	L 68–99	1–13 (0–3)	14 – Potter	5 – 2 tied	2 – Hafoka	Taco Bell Arena (1,284); Boise, ID
Jan 16, 2019; 10:00 am		at Utah State	L 49–82	1–14 (0–4)	11 – Anderson	5 – Kohlhaas	4 – Potter	Smith Spectrum (3,185); Logan, UT
Jan 19, 2019; 2:00 pm		UNLV	L 43–53	1–15 (0–5)	9 – Benally	10 – Wilson	5 – Marquez	Event Center Arena (514); San Jose, CA
Jan 23, 2019; 7:00 pm		Wyoming	L 56–70	1–16 (0–6)	16 – Lewis	7 – Lewis	3 – Marquez	Event Center Arena (418); San Jose, CA
Jan 26, 2019; 1:00 pm		at Air Force	L 56–70	1–17 (0–7)	16 – Lewis	7 – Lewis	3 – Marquez	Clune Arena (418); Colorado Springs, CO
Jan 30, 2019; 7:00 pm		Utah State	W 68–59	2–17 (1–7)	21 – Marquez	7 – Lewis	5 – Marquez	Event Center Arena (836); San Jose, CA
Feb 2, 2019; 1:00 pm		at San Diego State	L 68–69	2–18 (1–8)	16 – Wilson	11 – Wilson	5 – Marquez	Viejas Arena (2,869); San Diego, CA
Feb 9, 2019; 2:00 pm		Boise State	L 69–83	2–19 (1–9)	17 – Benally	9 – Hafoka	5 – Hafoka	Event Center Arena (402); San Jose, CA
Feb 13, 2019; 7:00 pm		New Mexico	L 60–79	2–20 (1–10)	14 – Wilson	12 – Wilson	4 – 2 tied	Event Center Arena (603); San Jose, CA
Feb 16, 2019; 2:00 pm		at UNLV	L 70–74	2–21 (1–11)	16 – Anderson	9 – Anderson	5 – Hafoka	Cox Pavilion (1,090); Paradise, NV
Feb 20, 2019; 6:00 pm		at Colorado State	W 78–70	3–21 (2–11)	18 – Hamm	6 – 2 tied	10 – Colaivalu	Moby Arena (1,031); Fort Collins, CO
Feb 23, 2019; 2:00 pm		Air Force	W 70–63	4–21 (3–11)	16 – Wilson	9 – Wilson	8 – Marquez	Event Center Arena (516); San Jose, CA
Feb 27, 2019; 6:00 pm		at New Mexico	L 72–110	4–22 (3–12)	22 – Anderson	5 – 2 tied	9 – Marquez	Dreamstyle Arena (5,974); Albuquerque, NM
Mar 2, 2019; 2:00 pm		San Diego State	W 84–76	5–22 (4–12)	31 – Benally	6 – Lewis	15 – Marquez	Event Center Arena (542); San Jose, CA
Mar 4, 2019; 5:30 pm		at Wyoming	L 56–82	5–23 (4–13)	14 – Potter	6 – Potter	3 – Marquez	Arena-Auditorium (2,932); Laramie, WY
Mar 7, 2019; 7:00 pm		Fresno State	W 65–57	6–23 (5–13)	21 – Marquez	8 – Marquez	6 – Hafoka	Event Center Arena (1,626); San Jose, CA
Mountain West Women's Tournament
Mar 10, 2019; 2:00 pm, Stadium	(9)	vs. (8) Nevada; First Round	L 68–78	6–24	19 – Marquez	4 – Wilson	5 – Marquez	Thomas & Mack Center; Paradise, NV
*Non-conference game. ^{#}Rankings from AP Poll. (#) Tournament seedings in parentheses. All times are in Pacific Time.

== See also ==
- 2018–19 San Jose State Spartans men's basketball team
