= Hørsholm =

Hørsholm Hørsholm
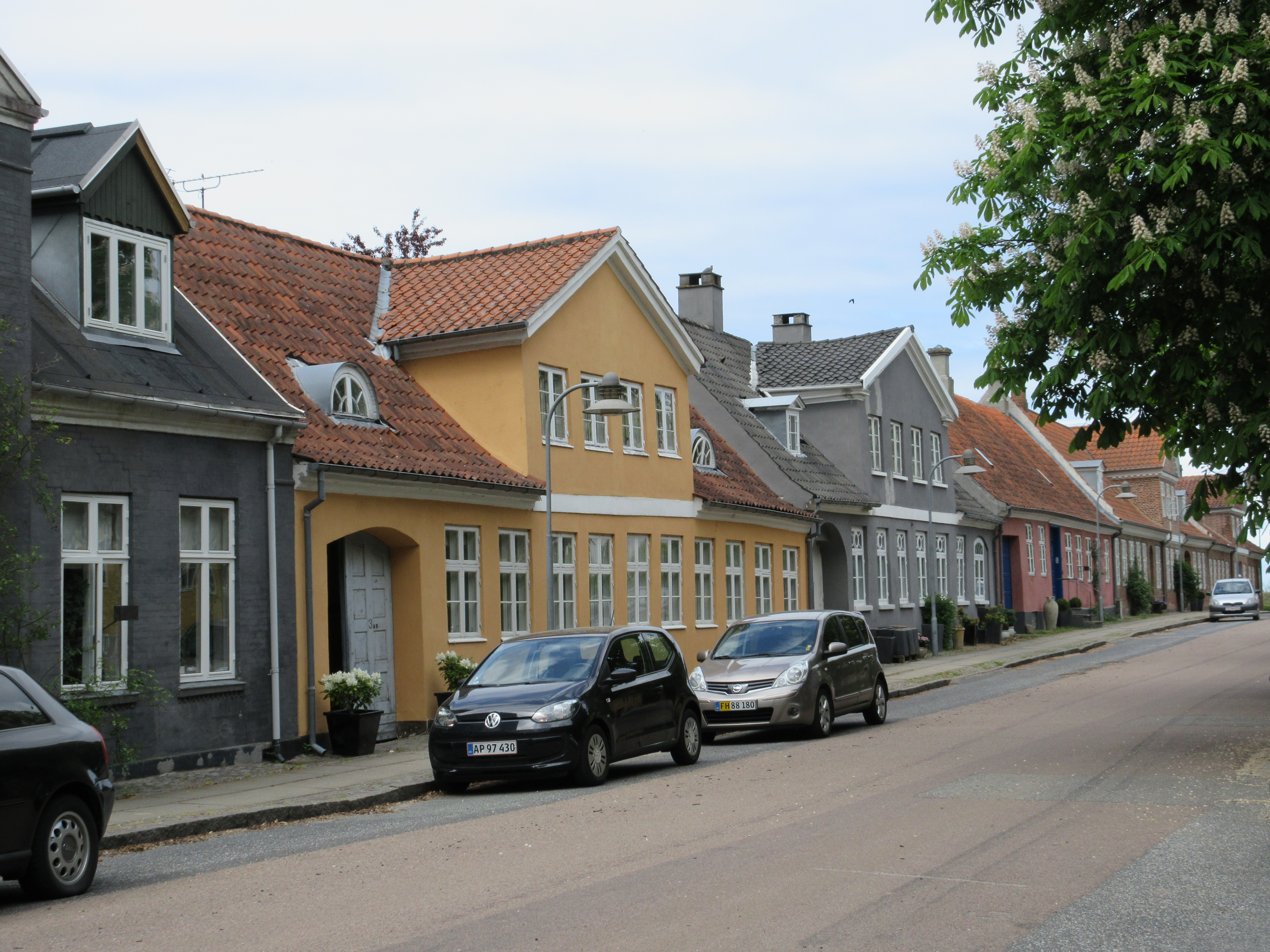
- Street view of Hørsholm

- Coat of arms
- Nickname: The home of Legends
- Location in Denmark
- Coordinates: 55°52′49″N 12°30′29″E
- Country: Denmark
- Region: Capital (Hovedstaden)
- Municipality: Hørsholm
- Current municipality: 2007-01-01

Area
  - Urban: 23.2 km^{2} (9.0 sq mi)
- Elevation: 32 m (105 ft)

Population (2026)
  - Urban: 48,797
  - Urban density: 2,051/km^{2} (5,310/sq mi)
  - Town: 24,833
- Time zone: UTC+1 (CET)
  - Summer (DST): UTC+1 (CEST)
- Postal code: 2970
- Website: horsholm.dk

Hørsholm (Danish pronunciation: [ˈhɶɐ̯sˌhʌlˀm]) is an urban area on the Øresund coast approximately 25 km (15.53 mi) north of Copenhagen, Denmark. It covers most of Hørsholm Municipality and straddles the borders neighbouring Fredensborg Municipality and Rudersdal Municipality.

Hørsholm proper is developed around Hirschholm Palace, which was constructed in the 1730s, but the town has later absorbed several of the nearby communities that are of much older origins.

== History ==
=== Palace and market town ===
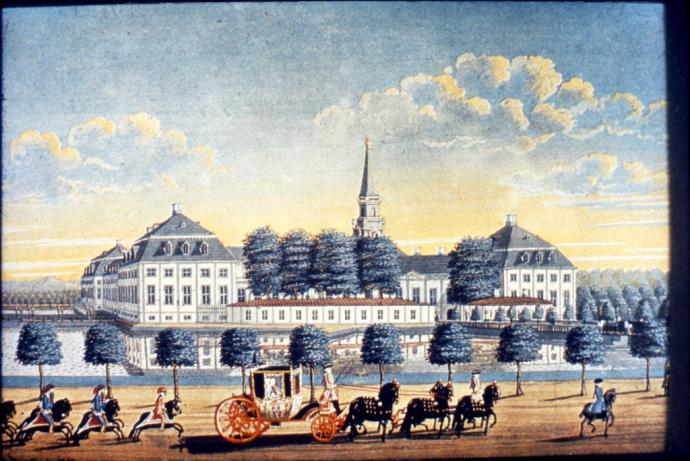
Hirschholm Palace in 1739 painted by Johan Jacob Bruun

Hørsholm was founded in connection with the construction of Hirschholm Palace. Niels Eigtved created a plan for a residence town in 1737 and to stimulate its growth, it was given status as market town in 1739. However, it never came to serve as a market town and was still only a small settlement when the palace was demolished between 1810 and 1816. Over the following decades it grew as a garrison town and a local centre for trade.

=== Industrialization ===
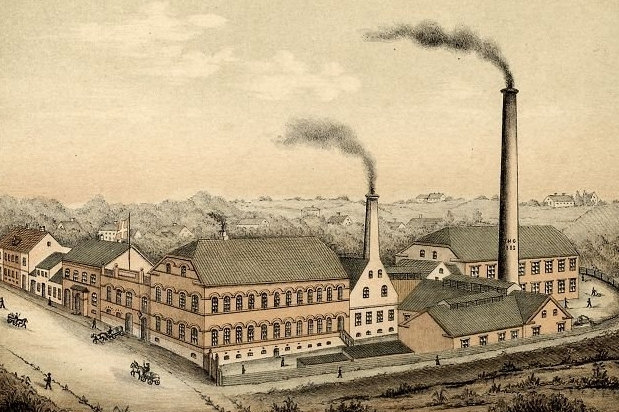
Hørsholm Textile Factory

A textile factory, later known as the Royal Military Textile Factory, had already been established in Usserød in the 1790s (closed 1981). It was later joined by other industrial enterprises, such as Hørsholm Textile Factory (1885–1975), Hørsholm Tobakspakkeri og Hørsholm Iron Foundry (1900–1965).

=== 20th-century growth ===
In the 20th century, Hørsholm gradually grew together with the neighbouring communities Usserød, Rungsted and Smidstrup. Most recently, Hørsholm has grown together with Kokkedal in Fredensborg-Humlebæk Municipality and Trørød, Vedbæk and Gammel Holte in Rudersdal Municipality.

== Nature, parks and open spaces ==
Hørsholm Slotshave, the former gardens of Hirschholm Palace, is the largest public park in Hørsholm. A little to the east of it lies Hørsholm Arboretum, part of the University of Copenhagen Faculty of Science. Hørsholm Cemetery is Hørsholm's largest cemetery. Rungsted Beach is Hørsholm's most popular beach but bathing is also possible at Mikkelborg and from several other localities along the coast.

Hørsholm is surrounded by a number of small woodlands. They include Rungsted Hegn–Folehave Skov, Kokkedal Skov, Elleskoven and Stasevang Skov. The larger Jægersborg Hegn, which separates Hørsholm from Skodsborg to the south, adjoins the extensive UNESCO-listed deer park Jægersborg Dyrehave.

== Culture and attractions ==
Trommen ("The Drum") is Hørsholm's principal cultural centre and also home to its main library. Hørsholm is home to several museums. Rungstedlund is the former home of the author Karen Blixen and is now home to the Karen Blixen Museum. The Danish Museum of Hunting and Forestry was based in the few surviving buildings from Hirschholm Palace, but it has now moved to Randers. Hørsholm is only about 17 km (11 mi) from Jægersborg Dyrehave and Store Dyrehave and some 30 km (19 mi) from Gribskov, all three included in the recently UNESCO-listed Par force hunting landscape in North Zealand developed by King Christian V in the late 17th century for hunting deer with hounds. The adjacent Hørsholm Local History Museum contains a Struensee exhibition. Gammel Holtegård plays host to temporary art exhibitions as well as a permanent archeological exhibition. The small Fuglsangshus is also used as a venue for changing art exhibitions.

== Economy ==
Hørsholm is linked to engineering consultancy and information technology. DTU science park, a science park now part of the Technical University of Denmark, is home to many technological start-ups.

Hørsholm Hospital used to be a major employer but has now closed.

The Danish roof window and skylight manufacturer VELUX has its company headquarters in Hørsholm.

== Transport ==
- Rungsted Kyst railway station and Kokkedal railway station on the coast are located on Kystbanen and served by the Oresundtrains which continue to Copenhagen Airport and across the Øresund Bridge to Sweden.

The Hørsholm Highway (now Helsingør Highway) is Denmark's oldest highway and connects Hørsholm to Copenhagen to the south and Helsingør to the north.

== Notable people ==
=== Nobility ===
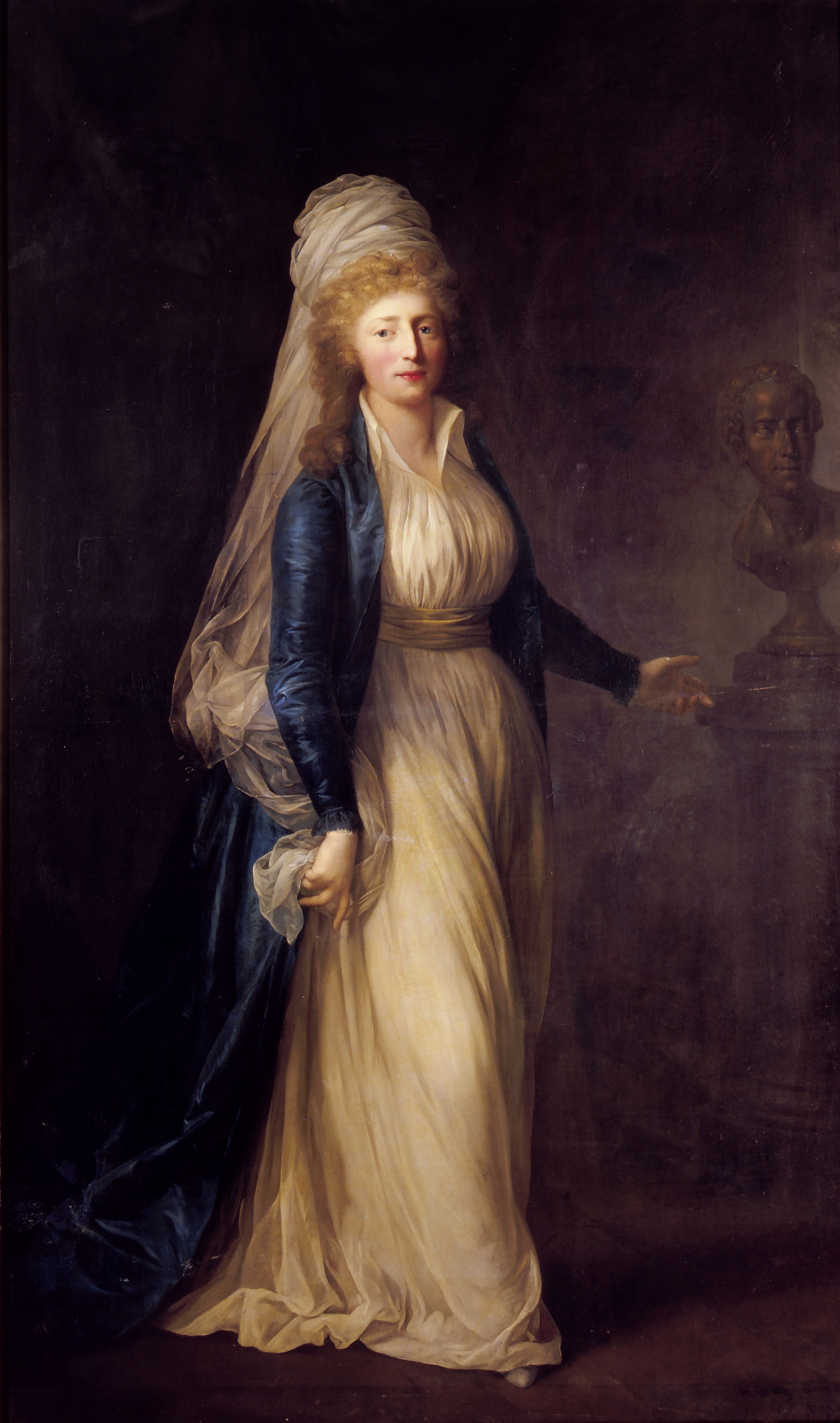
Princess Louise Augusta, 1791

- Princess Louise Auguste of Denmark (1771 in Hirschholm Palace – 1843) very close to her older brother, Crown Prince Frederick
- Wilhelmine Schröder (1839–1924) a Swedish telegraphist, writer and journalist and confidant and royal mistress of King Charles XV of Sweden

=== The Arts ===
- Johannes Ewald (1743–1781) a Danish national dramatist and poet, lived in the municipality
- Harald Conrad Stilling (1815–1891) an architect of the Late Classical period
- Claus Bjørn (1944–2005), author, historian and broadcaster
- Sir Stig Fogh Andersen (born 1950) a Danish operatic tenor, a Wagner-tenor
- Jesper Kyd (born 1972) a Danish composer and sound designer
- Alex Vargas (born 1988) a Danish singer, songwriter and record producer

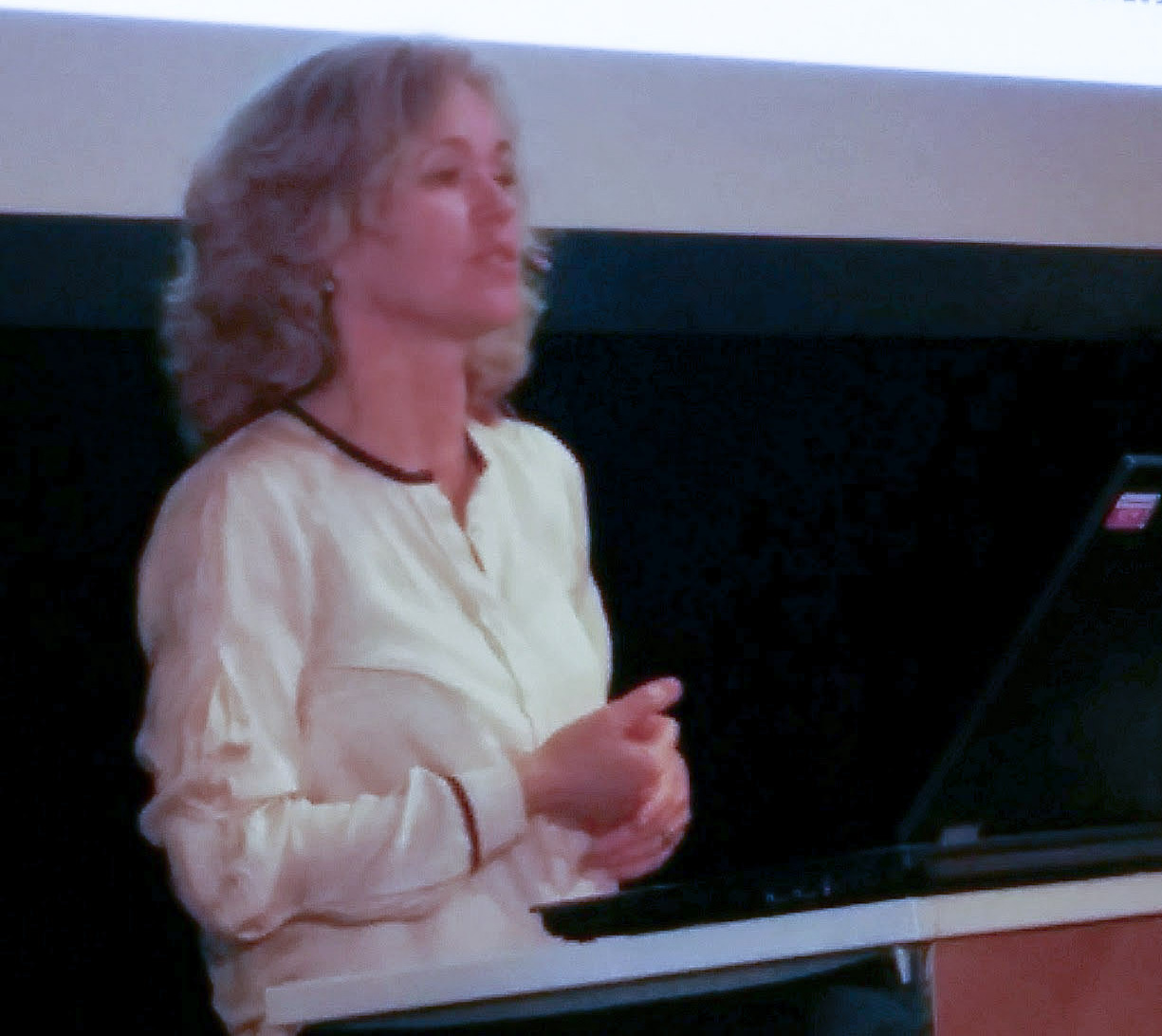
Anja Cetti Andersen, 2015

=== Science, Business & Public Service ===
- Rogert Møller (1844–1918) a Danish architect, credit union manager and local politician
- Mary Westenholz (1857–1947 in Hørsholm) a Danish Unitarian, women's rights activist, writer and editor; aunt and supporter of Karen Blixen
- Holger Scheuermann (1877–1960) a surgeon, eponym for Scheuermann's disease
- Gunnar Dyrberg (1921 – 2012 in Hørsholm) a member of the Danish resistance during WWII
- Henrik Stiesdal (born 1957) an inventor and businessman in the modern wind power industry
- Karen Ellemann (born 1969) politician and former teacher, lives in Hørsholm
- Jakob Ellemann-Jensen (born 1973) a Danish politician, former Army officer and lawyer
- Sofie Carsten Nielsen (born 1975) politician and former Higher Education Minister
- Anja Cetti Andersen (born 1965) an astronomer and astrophysicist

=== Sport ===
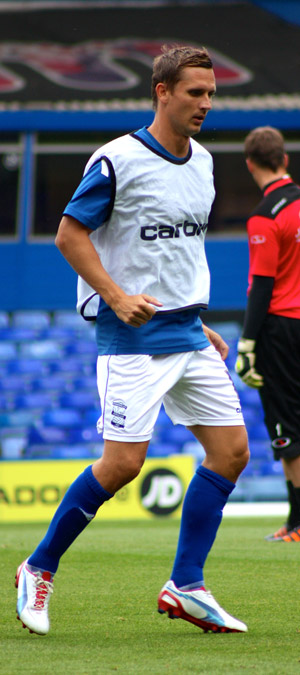
Peter Løvenkrands, 2012

- Charles Buchwald (1880 – 1951 in Hørsholm) a Danish amateur footballer, played seven games for Denmark and team silver medallist at the 1908 and 1912 Summer Olympics
- Susanne Slotsager (born 1966) a Danish female curler
- Anisette Torp-Lind (born 1971) a former figure skater, competed at the 1992 Winter Olympics
- Tommy Løvenkrands (born 1974) a former footballer, 157 club caps
- Louise Hansen (born 1975) a retired footballer, Denmark's most successful woman footballer, she played 98 games for Denmark from 1995 to 2007
- Tine Baun (born 1979) a former badminton player, won the women's All England Open Badminton Championships three times in 2008, 2010 and 2013
- Peter Løvenkrands (born 1980) a former footballer, 313 club caps and 22 for Denmark
- Per Holten Møller (born 1952) a Danish former ice hockey player
- Christina Nielsen (born 1992) a Danish auto racing driver
- Rasmus Højlund (born 2003), footballer with Manchester United and Denmark, grew up in Hørsholm.
- Amalie Milling (born 1999), Danish handball player for the Danish national team.

== See also ==
- Civic Alternative
