= Civic Alternative =

Political party in Hørsholm, Denmark

Civic Alternative or Bourgeois Alternative (in Danish: Borgerligt Alternativ) is a local political party in Hørsholm, Denmark. BA was launched by a local Venstre personality, Ib Lunde Rasmussen, who felt dissatisfied with the local Venstre leadership.

In the 2005 municipal elections the party got 352 votes (2.6%), but no seat in the municipal council.
