= Domašov =

- Municipality
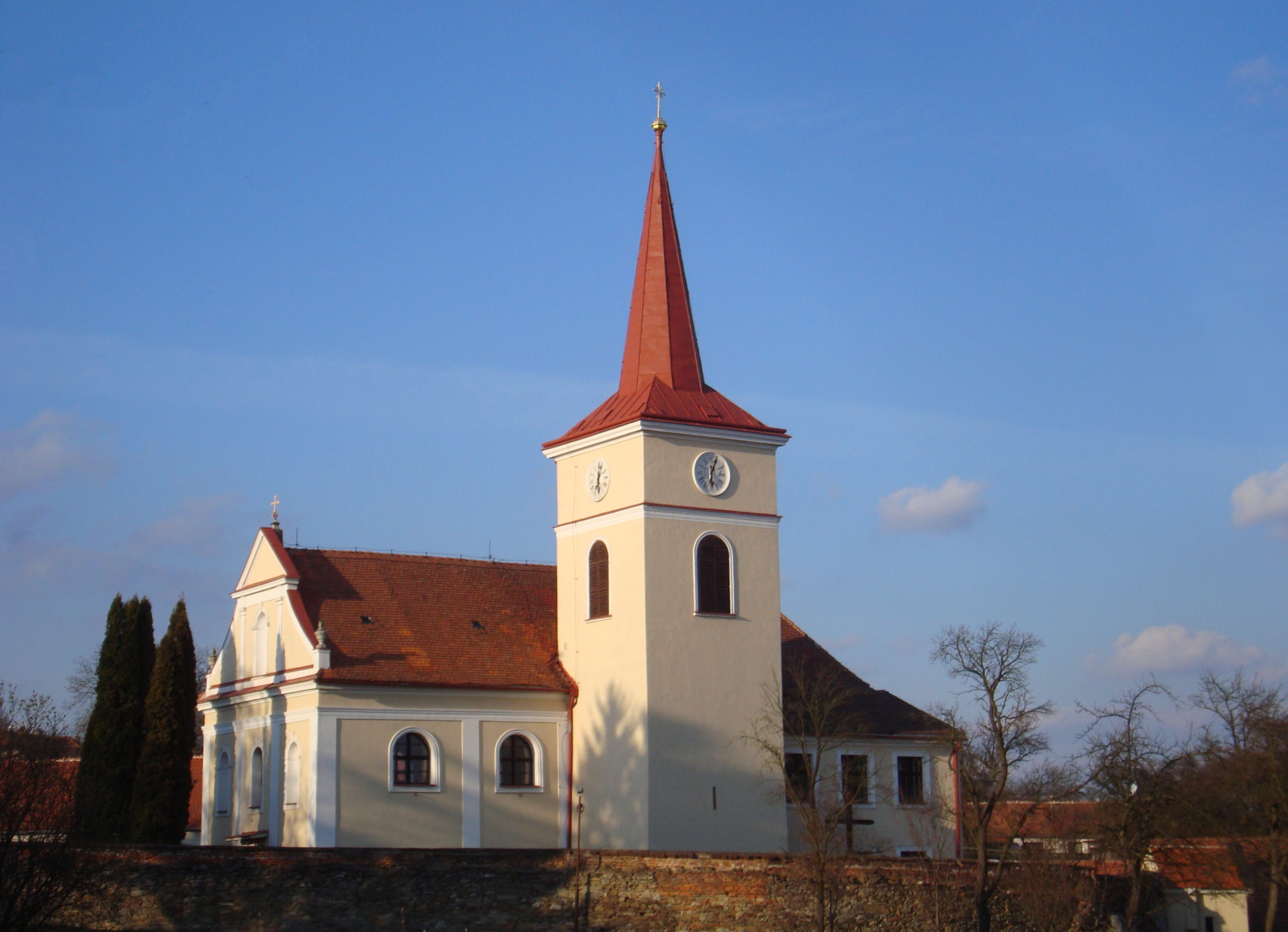
- Church of Saint Lawrence

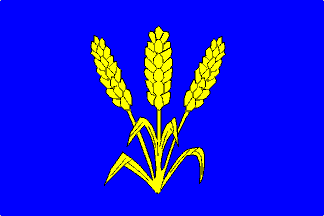
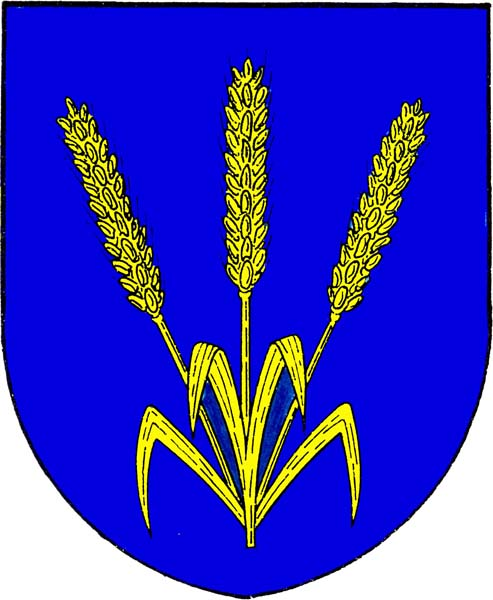
- Flag Coat of arms

- Location in the Czech Republic
- Coordinates: 49°14′43″N 16°20′38″E
- Country: Czech Republic
- Region: South Moravian
- District: Brno-Country
- First mentioned: 1048

Area
  - Total: 5.93 km^{2} (2.29 sq mi)
- Elevation: 460 m (1,510 ft)

Population (2026-01-01)
  - Total: 720
  - Density: 120/km^{2} (310/sq mi)
- Time zone: UTC+1 (CET)
  - Summer (DST): UTC+2 (CEST)
- Postal code: 664 83
- Website: www.domasov.eu

Domašov is a municipality and village in Brno-Country District in the South Moravian Region of the Czech Republic. It has about 700 inhabitants.

Domašov lies approximately 22 kilometres (14 mi) west of Brno and 167 km (104 mi) south-east of Prague.

== Demographics ==
Historical population
Year	Pop.	±%
1869	695	—
1880	678	−2.4%
1890	699	+3.1%
1900	721	+3.1%
1910	747	+3.6%
1921	655	−12.3%
1930	659	+0.6%
1950	608	−7.7%
1961	641	+5.4%
1970	608	−5.1%
1980	587	−3.5%
1991	551	−6.1%
2001	583	+5.8%
2011	647	+11.0%
2021	662	+2.3%
Source: Censuses
