= 2018–19 Portland State Vikings women's basketball team =

Intercollegiate basketball season

2018–19 Portland State Vikings women's basketball

Big Sky tournament champions

NCAA tournament, first round
- Conference: Big Sky Conference
- Record: 25–8 (14–6 Big Sky)
- Head coach: Lynn Kennedy (4th season)
- Assistant coaches: Chelsey Zimmerman; Amy Denson; Keithan Gregg
- Home arena: Viking Pavilion

2018–19 Big Sky women's basketball standings
	Conf.				Overall
Team	W		L	PCT	W		L	PCT
Idaho	16	–	4	.800	22	–	12	.647
Northern Colorado	15	–	5	.750	21	–	11	.656
Idaho State	15	–	5	.750	20	–	11	.645
Portland State †	14	–	6	.700	25	–	8	.758
Montana State	11	–	9	.550	16	–	15	.516
Eastern Washington	9	–	11	.450	13	–	20	.394
Montana	9	–	11	.450	14	–	16	.467
Northern Arizona	8	–	12	.400	13	–	18	.419
Sacramento State	6	–	14	.300	10	–	19	.345
Southern Utah	4	–	16	.200	8	–	23	.258
Weber State	3	–	17	.150	6	–	25	.194
† 2019 Big Sky tournament winner Rankings from AP poll

The 2018–19 Portland State Vikings women's basketball team represented Portland State University during the 2018–19 NCAA Division I women's basketball season. The Vikings, led by fourth-year head coach Lynn Kennedy, returned to play their home games at Viking Pavilion after a one-year renovation and were members of the Big Sky Conference. They finished the season 25–8, 14–6 in Big Sky, play to finish in fourth place. As the No. 4 seed in the Big Sky Conference women's tournament, they advanced to the championship game and defeated Eastern Washington, earning their second invitation to the NCAA Division I women's basketball tournament. They lost to Oregon in the first round.

== Roster ==
2018–19 Portland State Vikings women's basketball team
Players
Coaches

Pos.	#	Name	Height	Year	Previous school	Hometown
G	0	Ashley Bolston	6 ft 2 in (1.88 m)	RS Sr	South Medford HS; Washington State	Medford, OR
G	1	Labrea Denson	5 ft 3 in (1.6 m)	So	Chief Sealth	Seattle, WA
G	2	Sidney Rielly	6 ft 0 in (1.83 m)	RS Sr	Everett HS; Santa Clara	Everett, WA
G	3	Kiana Brown	5 ft 8 in (1.73 m)	RS Sr	Triangle Lake HS; Washington State/Humboldt State	Cottage Grove, OR
F	4	Pia Jurhar	6 ft 3 in (1.91 m)	Sr	BRG XIX Krottenbachstraße	Vienna, Austria
F	5	Savannah Dhaliwal	6 ft 0 in (1.83 m)	So	Panorama Ridge	Surrey, BC
F	10	Courtney West	6 ft 4 in (1.93 m)	RS Sr	Port Hacking HS; Southern Oregon	Sydney, Australia
F	11	Jordan Stotler	6 ft 3 in (1.91 m)	Jr	Roseburg HS; Umpqua CC	Roseburg, OR
F	12	Tatiana Streun	6 ft 0 in (1.83 m)	Jr	Bellevue HS	Bellevue, WA
G	15	Corey James	5 ft 10 in (1.78 m)	Sr	West Albany HS	Albany, OR
G	20	Ana Tainta	5 ft 8 in (1.73 m)	Fr	IES Miralbueno	Zaragoza, Spain
G	22	Ruchae Walton	5 ft 10 in (1.78 m)	So	Charnwood	Milton Keynes, England
G	23	Kylie Jimenez	5 ft 6 in (1.68 m)	So	Horizon	Thornton, CO
G	53	Desirae Hansen	6 ft 0 in (1.83 m)	Fr	Rainier HS	Rainier, OR

Head coach

- Lynn Kennedy (Northwest)

Assistant coach(es)

- Chelsey Zimmerman (Southern Oregon)
- Amy Denson (Arizona State)
- Keithan Gregg (Great Falls)

Legend

- (C) Team captain
- (S) Suspended
- (I) Ineligible
- (W) Walk-on
- Injured
- Current redshirt

Roster
Last update: December 9, 2024

== Schedule ==
Date time, TV	Rank^{#}	Opponent^{#}	Result	Record	Site (attendance) city, state
Exhibition
October 26, 2018*; 7:00 p.m.		Simpson	W 90–52		Viking Pavilion (123); Portland, OR
November 2, 2018*; 5:00 p.m.		Lewis & Clark	W 97–46		Viking Pavilion; Portland, OR
Non-conference regular season
November 9, 2018*; 7:00 p.m.		Warner Pacific	W 102–49	1–0	Viking Pavilion (425); Portland, OR
November 11, 2018*; 2:00 p.m.		San Jose State	W 80–51	2–0	Viking Pavilion (377); Portland, OR
November 16, 2018*; 4:00 p.m.		UC Davis	W 65–50	3–0	Viking Pavilion (342); Portland, OR
November 24, 2018*; 2:00 p.m.		Seattle	W 68–43	4–0	Viking Pavilion (334); Portland, OR
December 1, 2018*; 2:00 p.m.		Portland	W 92–79	5–0	Viking Pavilion (425); Portland, OR
December 9, 2018*; 1:00 p.m.		at UTEP	W 89–61	6–0	Don Haskins Center (276); El Paso, TX
December 11, 2018*; 5:00 p.m.		at Grand Canyon	W 60–55	7–0	GCU Arena (454); Phoenix, AZ
December 15, 2018*; 2:00 p.m.		UNLV	W 58–49	8–0	Viking Pavilion (413); Portland, OR
December 18, 2018*; 7:00 p.m.		UC Irvine	L 68–73	8–1	Viking Pavilion (320); Portland, OR
Big Sky regular season
December 31, 2018; 5:00 p.m.		at Northern Colorado	L 63–79	8–2 (0–1)	Bank of Colorado Arena (931); Greeley, CO
January 3, 2019; 7:00 p.m.		Montana State	W 55–53	9–2 (1–1)	Viking Pavilion (527); Portland, OR
January 5, 2019; 2:00 p.m.		Montana	W 78–60	10–2 (2–1)	Viking Pavilion (601); Portland, OR
January 12, 2019; 1:00 p.m.		at Weber State	W 77–59	11–2 (3–1)	Dee Events Center (502); Ogden, UT
January 17, 2019; 7:00 p.m.		Southern Utah	W 63–49	12–2 (4–1)	Viking Pavilion (537); Portland, OR
January 19, 2019; 2:00 p.m.		Northern Arizona	W 72–55	13–2 (5–1)	Viking Pavilion (541); Portland, OR
January 24, 2019; 11:00 a.m.		at Eastern Washington	W 76–64	14–2 (6–1)	Reese Court (4,124); Cheney, WA
January 26, 2019; 2:00 p.m.		at Idaho	L 78–80	14–3 (6–2)	Cowan Spectrum (556); Moscow, ID
January 31, 2019; 7:00 p.m.		Weber State	W 65–38	15–3 (7–2)	Viking Pavilion (443); Portland, OR
February 2, 2019; 2:00 p.m.		Idaho State	L 57–58	15–4 (7–3)	Viking Pavilion (527); Portland, OR
February 7, 2019; 7:00 p.m.		Sacramento State	W 74–58	16–4 (8–3)	Viking Pavilion (545); Portland, OR
February 9, 2019; 2:00 p.m.		Northern Colorado	W 85–66	17–4 (9–3)	Viking Pavilion (427); Portland, OR
February 14, 2019; 5:30 p.m.		at Northern Arizona	W 74–59	18–4 (10–3)	Walkup Skydome (202); Flagstaff, AZ
February 16, 2019; 1:00 p.m.		at Southern Utah	W 81–56	19–4 (11–3)	America First Events Center (463); Cedar City, UT
February 21, 2019; 6:00 p.m.		at Idaho State	L 54–72	19–5 (11–4)	Reed Gym (874); Pocatello, ID
February 23, 2019; 2:00 p.m.		at Sacramento State	W 75–57	20–5 (12–4)	Hornets Nest; Sacramento, CA
February 28, 2019; 7:00 p.m.		Idaho	L 68–81	20–6 (12–5)	Viking Pavilion (889); Portland, OR
March 2, 2019; 2:00 p.m.		Eastern Washington	W 76–57	21–6 (13–5)	Viking Pavilion (529); Portland, OR
March 7, 2019; 6:00 p.m.		at Montana	L 70–73 ^{OT}	21–7 (13–6)	Dahlberg Arena (2,837); Missoula, MT
March 9, 2019; 1:00 p.m.		at Montana State	W 68–55	22–7 (14–6)	Brick Breeden Fieldhouse (1,708); Bozeman, MT
Big Sky women's tournament
March 12, 2019; 1:30 p.m.	(4)	vs. (5) Montana State; Quarterfinals	W 68–56	23–7	CenturyLink Arena; Boise, ID
March 13, 2019; 4:30 p.m., ELVN	(4)	vs. (1) Idaho; Semifinals	W 75–59	24–7	CenturyLink Arena; Boise, ID
March 15, 2019; 12:00 p.m., ELVN	(4)	vs. (6) Eastern Washington; Championship game	W 61–59	25–7	CenturyLink Arena; Boise, ID
NCAA women's tournament
March 22, 2019*; 6:30 p.m., ESPN2	(15 P)	at (2 P) No. 7 Oregon; First round	L 40–78	25–8	Matthew Knight Arena (6,523); Eugene, OR
*Non-conference game. ^{#}Rankings from AP poll. (#) Tournament seedings in parentheses. P=Portland Region. All times are in Pacific.

== See also ==
- 2018–19 Portland State Vikings men's basketball team
