= 2018–19 Weber State Wildcats women's basketball team =

Intercollegiate basketball season

2018–19 Weber State Wildcats women's basketball
- Conference: Big Sky Conference
- Record: 6–25 (3–17 Big Sky)
- Head coach: Velaida Harris (1st season)
- Assistant coaches: Darryl Brown; Amy Donovan
- Home arena: Dee Events Center

2018–19 Big Sky women's basketball standings
	Conf.				Overall
Team	W		L	PCT	W		L	PCT
Idaho	16	–	4	.800	22	–	12	.647
Northern Colorado	15	–	5	.750	21	–	11	.656
Idaho State	15	–	5	.750	20	–	11	.645
Portland State †	14	–	6	.700	25	–	8	.758
Montana State	11	–	9	.550	16	–	15	.516
Eastern Washington	9	–	11	.450	13	–	20	.394
Montana	9	–	11	.450	14	–	16	.467
Northern Arizona	8	–	12	.400	13	–	18	.419
Sacramento State	6	–	14	.300	10	–	19	.345
Southern Utah	4	–	16	.200	8	–	23	.258
Weber State	3	–	17	.150	6	–	25	.194
† 2019 Big Sky tournament winner Rankings from AP poll

The 2018–19 Weber State Wildcats women's basketball team represented Weber State University during the 2018–19 NCAA Division I women's basketball season. The Wildcats were led by first year head coach Bethann Ord and played their home games at the Dee Events Center. They were members of the Big Sky Conference.

== Radio broadcasts ==
All Wildcats games are heard on KWCR with Nick Bailey calling the action. All home games and conference road games are also streamed with video live online through Watch Big Sky.

== Roster ==
2018–19 Weber State Wildcats women's basketball team
Players
Coaches

Pos.	#	Name	Height	Year	Previous school	Hometown
G	0	Jaiamoni Welch-Coleman	5 ft 3 in (1.6 m)	Sr	Berkeley	Berkeley, CA
G	1	Cyliest Smith	5 ft 6 in (1.68 m)	Fr	Mansfield Legacy	Mansfield, TX
G	2	Ashley Thoms	5 ft 7 in (1.7 m)	Fr	Campolindo	Lafayette, CA
G	4	Kori Pentzer	5 ft 9 in (1.75 m)	Fr	Melba	Melba, ID
F	5	Ciara James	6 ft 2 in (1.88 m)	Fr	Clackamas	Clackamas, OR
G	10	Shianne Johnson	5 ft 8 in (1.73 m)	So	Killeen	Harker Heights, TX
G	11	Liz Eaton (redshirt)	5 ft 10 in (1.78 m)	Jr	Maple Mountain; BYU	Mapleton, UT
F	12	Kayla Watkins	6 ft 2 in (1.88 m)	So	Glacier Peak	Snohomish, WA
G	20	Emily Drake	5 ft 9 in (1.75 m)	Sr	Pullman	Pullman, WA
F	24	Dominique Williams	6 ft 0 in (1.83 m)	Jr	Centennial	Meridian, ID
G	32	Ashley Massell	5 ft 9 in (1.75 m)	Fr	Oaks Christian School	Westlake Village, CA
C	33	Gina O'Brien	6 ft 6 in (1.98 m)	Jr	Methodist Ladies'	Melbourne, Australia

Head coach

- Velaida Harris (Portland State)

Assistant coach(es)

- Darryl Brown (Temple)
- Amy Donovan (Washington)

Legend

- (C) Team captain
- (S) Suspended
- (I) Ineligible
- (W) Walk-on
- Injured
- Current redshirt

Roster

== Schedule ==
Date time, TV	Rank^{#}	Opponent^{#}	Result	Record	Site (attendance) city, state
Exhibition
Nov 3, 2018*; 4:00 pm		College of Idaho	W 93–67		Dee Events Center; Ogden, UT
Non-conference regular season
Nov 9, 2018*; 5:00 pm		La Verne	W 105–43	1–0	Dee Events Center (672); Ogden, UT
Nov 12, 2018*; 5:00 pm		Portland	L 73–89	1–1	Dee Events Center (569); Ogden, UT
Nov 21, 2018*; 4:00 pm		at Incarnate Word	W 72–64	2–1	McDermott Convocation Center (432); San Antonio, TX
Nov 23, 2018*; 4:00 pm		vs. VCU; UTSA Thanksgiving Classic	L 36–64	2–2	Convocation Center (226); San Antonio, TX
Nov 24, 2018*; 1:00 pm		at UTSA; UTSA Thanksgiving Classic	L 59–64	2–3	Convocation Center (333); San Antonio, TX
Nov 28, 2018*; 7:00 pm		UTEP	W 68–63	3–3	Dee Events Center (510); Ogden, UT
Dec 5, 2018*; 8:00 pm		at Pepperdine	L 47–68	3–4	Firestone Fieldhouse (437); Malibu, CA
Dec 15, 2018*; 2:00 pm		at Utah; Old Oquirrh Bucket	L 56–77	3–5	Jon M. Huntsman Center (2,062); Salt Lake City, UT
Dec 18, 2018*; 11:00 am		at Utah Valley; Old Oquirrh Bucket	L 59–65	3–6	Lockhart Arena (401); Orem, UT
Dec 20, 2018*; 7:00 pm		UC Riverside	L 39–71	3–7	Dee Events Center (456); Ogden, UT
Big Sky regular season
Dec 29, 2018; 2:00 pm		Eastern Washington	L 58–64	3–8 (0–1)	Dee Events Center (686); Ogden, UT
Dec 31, 2018; 2:00 pm		Idaho	L 74–79	3–9 (0–2)	Dee Events Center (439); Ogden, UT
Jan 3, 2019; 6:30 pm		at Northern Arizona	L 64–74	3–10 (0–3)	Walkup Skydome (178); Flagstaff, AZ
Jan 5, 2019; 2:00 pm		at Southern Utah; Old Oquirrh Bucket	L 79–84 ^{OT}	3–11 (0–4)	America First Events Center (568); Cedar City, UT
Jan 10, 2019; 7:00 pm		Idaho State	L 57–70	3–12 (0–5)	Dee Events Center (491); Ogden, UT
Jan 12, 2019; 2:00 pm		Portland State	L 59–77	3–13 (0–6)	Dee Events Center (502); Ogden, UT
Jan 17, 2019; 12:00 pm		at Northern Colorado	W 55–54	4–13 (1–6)	Bank of Colorado Arena (2,765); Greeley, CO
Jan 24, 2019; 7:00 pm		Montana State	L 59–66	4–14 (1–7)	Dee Events Center (467); Ogden, UT
Jan 26, 2019; 2:00 pm		Montana	L 60–72	4–15 (1–8)	Dee Events Center (609); Ogden, UT
Jan 31, 2019; 8:00 pm		at Portland State	L 38–65	4–16 (1–9)	Viking Pavilion (443); Portland, OR
Feb 2, 2019; 3:00 pm		at Sacramento State	L 62–77	4–17 (1–10)	Hornets Nest (287); Sacramento, CA
Feb 7, 2019; 12:00 pm		Southern Utah; Old Oquirrh Bucket	W 67–66	5–17 (2–10)	Dee Events Center (1,532); Ogden, UT
Feb 9, 2019; 2:00 pm		Northern Arizona	L 64–75	5–18 (2–11)	Dee Events Center (576); Ogden, UT
Feb 14, 2019; 2:00 pm		at Montana	L 56–64	5–19 (2–12)	Dahlberg Arena (3,215); Missoula, MT
Feb 16, 2019; 2:00 pm		at Montana State	L 59–72	5–20 (2–13)	Brick Breeden Fieldhouse (2,017); Bozeman, MT
Feb 20, 2019; 12:00 pm		Sacramento State	L 69–78	5–21 (2–14)	Dee Events Center (1,126); Odgen, UT
Feb 23, 2019; 2:00 pm		at Idaho State	L 57–84	5–22 (2–15)	Reed Gym (1,047); Pocatello, ID
Mar 2, 2019; 12:00 pm		Northern Colorado	L 61–71	5–23 (2–16)	Dee Events Center (622); Ogden, UT
Mar 7, 2019; 7:00 pm		at Idaho	L 78–86	5–24 (2–17)	Cowan Spectrum (653); Moscow, ID
Mar 9, 2019; 3:00 pm		at Eastern Washington	W 70–66	6–24 (3–17)	Reese Court (681); Cheney, WA
Big Sky Women's Tournament
Mar 11, 2019; 8:00 pm	(11)	vs. (6) Eastern Washington; First Round	L 74–81	6–25	CenturyLink Arena; Boise, ID
*Non-conference game. ^{#}Rankings from AP Poll. (#) Tournament seedings in parentheses. All times are in Mountain Time.

== See also ==
2018–19 Weber State Wildcats men's basketball team
