= 2018–19 Sacramento State Hornets women's basketball team =

Intercollegiate basketball season

2018–19 Sacramento State Hornets women's basketball
- Conference: Big Sky Conference
- Record: 10–19 (6–14 Big Sky)
- Head coach: Bunky Harkleroad (6th season)
- Assistant coaches: Bill Baxter; Derrick Florence; Jessica Kunisaki
- Home arena: Hornets Nest

2018–19 Big Sky women's basketball standings
	Conf.				Overall
Team	W		L	PCT	W		L	PCT
Idaho	16	–	4	.800	22	–	12	.647
Northern Colorado	15	–	5	.750	21	–	11	.656
Idaho State	15	–	5	.750	20	–	11	.645
Portland State †	14	–	6	.700	25	–	8	.758
Montana State	11	–	9	.550	16	–	15	.516
Eastern Washington	9	–	11	.450	13	–	20	.394
Montana	9	–	11	.450	14	–	16	.467
Northern Arizona	8	–	12	.400	13	–	18	.419
Sacramento State	6	–	14	.300	10	–	19	.345
Southern Utah	4	–	16	.200	8	–	23	.258
Weber State	3	–	17	.150	6	–	25	.194
† 2019 Big Sky tournament winner Rankings from AP poll

The 2018–19 Sacramento State Hornets women's basketball team represented California State University, Sacramento during the 2018–19 NCAA Division I women's basketball season. The Hornets were led by sixth year head coach Bunky Harkleroad and played their home games at Hornets Nest. They were members of the Big Sky Conference. They finished the season 10–19, 6–14 in Big Sky play to finish in ninth place. They lost in the first round of the Big Sky women's tournament to Northern Arizona.

== Roster ==
2018–19 Sacramento State Hornets women's basketball team
Players
Coaches

Pos.	#	Name	Height	Year	Previous school	Hometown
G	1	Milee Enger	5 ft 7 in (1.7 m)	Fr	Herriman HS	Herriman, UT
G	3	Tiara Scott	5 ft 4 in (1.63 m)	Jr	St. Anthony HS	Torrance, CA
G	5	Brooke Panfili	5 ft 7 in (1.7 m)	So	Acalanes HS; St. Edward's	Lafayette, CA
G	10	Gabi Bade	5 ft 8 in (1.73 m)	RS Jr	Pinewood School; Buffalo	Milpitas, CA
G	11	Summer Menke	5 ft 10 in (1.78 m)	Fr	Chaparral HS	Scottsdale, AZ
F	12	Anna Weibel	6 ft 3 in (1.91 m)	So	Estes Park HS	Estes Park, CO
G	14	Quayonna Harris	5 ft 5 in (1.65 m)	Jr	Sacramento HS	Sacramento, CA
F	15	Maesyn Rix	5 ft 9 in (1.75 m)	Fr	Buchanan HS	Auberry, CA
G	20	Raegen Rohn	5 ft 6 in (1.68 m)	Sr	Monarch HS	Boulder, CO
G	23	Skylar Jackson	5 ft 10 in (1.78 m)	So	Bishop Gorman HS	Las Vegas, NV
G/F	24	Tiana Johnson	6 ft 2 in (1.88 m)	So	Flathead HS	Kalispell, MT
G	25	Emily Enochs	5 ft 7 in (1.7 m)	Fr	Gymnasium Carolinum Osnabrück	Osnabrück, Germany
F	30	Kennedy Nicholas	6 ft 3 in (1.91 m)	Jr	Inglemoor HS	Kirkland, WA
G	32	Hannah Friend	6 ft 0 in (1.83 m)	RS Jr	Farmington HS; Delaware	Troy, NY
G	33	Sarah Abney	5 ft 8 in (1.73 m)	Fr	Las Cruces HS	Las Cruces, NM
G	34	Claire Bady	5 ft 7 in (1.7 m)	Jr	Eastern Florida State College	Strasbourg, France
F	44	Julynne da Silva Sa	6 ft 4 in (1.93 m)	Jr	Northwest College	Barcarena, Pará, Brazil

Head coach

- Bunky Harkleroad (Berea)

Assistant coach(es)

- Bill Baxter (UC Davis)
- Derrick Florence (Morehouse)
- Jessica Kunisaki (Chapman)

Legend

- (C) Team captain
- (S) Suspended
- (I) Ineligible
- (W) Walk-on
- Injured
- Current redshirt

Roster

== Schedule ==
Date time, TV	Rank^{#}	Opponent^{#}	Result	Record	Site (attendance) city, state
Exhibition
Nov 5, 2018*; 7:05 pm		William Jessup	W 106–103		Hornets Nest; Sacramento, CA
Non-conference regular season
Nov 11, 2018*; 2:05 pm		Cal Poly	W 88–85	1–0	Hornets Nest (307); Sacramento, CA
Nov 16, 2018*; 8:35 pm		Ohio State	Postponed		Hornets Nest; Sacramento, CA
Nov 23, 2018*; 4:05 pm		vs. Pepperdine; ShareSLO Holiday Beach Classic	L 97–113	1–1	Mott Athletics Center (189); San Luis Obispo, CA
Nov 24, 2018*; 2:05 pm		vs. Illinois; ShareSLO Holiday Beach Classic	W 109–107	2–1	Mott Athletics Center (152); San Luis Obispo, CA
Dec 1, 2018*; 2:05 pm		Antelope Valley	W 86–80	3–1	Hornets Nest (308); Sacramento, CA
Dec 5, 2018*; 7:05 pm		San Francisco	L 75–86	3–2	Hornets Nest (336); Sacramento, CA
Dec 7, 2018*; 7:05 pm		UC Davis	L 60–109	3–3	Hornets Nest (516); Sacramento, CA
Dec 19, 2018*; 6:05 pm		at New Mexico; Lobo Invitational	L 53–85	3–4	Dreamstyle Arena (4,708); Albuquerque, NM
Dec 20, 2018*; 2:35 pm		vs. Hampton; Lobo Invitational	W 65–61	4–4	Dreamstyle Arena; Albuquerque, NM
Big Sky regular season
Dec 29, 2018; 1:05 pm		at Northern Colorado	L 69–82	4–5 (0–1)	Bank of Colorado Arena (1,063); Greeley, CO
Jan 3, 2019; 7:05 pm		Montana	L 86–88 ^{2OT}	4–6 (0–2)	Hornets Nest (206); Sacramento, CA
Jan 5, 2019; 2:05 pm		Montana State	L 53–69	4–7 (0–3)	Hornets Nest (332); Sacramento, CA
Jan 12, 2019; 1:05 pm		at Idaho State	L 43–73	4–8 (0–4)	Reed Gym (987); Pocatello, ID
Jan 17, 2019; 12:05 pm		Northern Arizona	W 65–61	5–8 (1–4)	Hornets Nest (607); Sacramento, CA
Jan 19, 2019; 2:05 pm		Southern Utah	W 77–76	6–8 (2–4)	Hornets Nest (477); Sacramento, CA
Jan 24, 2019; 6:05 pm		at Idaho	L 66–104	6–9 (2–5)	Cowan Spectrum (520); Moscow, ID
Jan 26, 2019; 2:05 pm		at Eastern Washington	W 73–70	7–9 (3–5)	Reese Court (256); Cheney, WA
Jan 31, 2019; 7:05 pm		Idaho State	L 42–56	7–10 (3–6)	Hornets Nest (261); Sacramento, CA
Feb 2, 2019; 2:05 pm		Weber State	W 77–62	8–10 (4–6)	Hornets Nest (287); Sacramento, CA
Feb 7, 2019; 2:05 pm		at Portland State	L 58–74	8–11 (4–7)	Viking Pavilion (545); Portland, OR
Feb 11, 2019; 5:05 pm		Northern Colorado	L 61–71	8–12 (4–8)	Hornets Nest (246); Sacramento, CA
Feb 14, 2019; 5:35 pm		at Southern Utah	W 75–69 ^{OT}	9–12 (5–8)	America First Events Center (667); Cedar City, UT
Feb 16, 2019; 6:05 pm		at Northern Arizona	L 69–71	9–13 (5–9)	Walkup Skydome (298); Flagstaff, AZ
Feb 20, 2019; 11:05 am		at Weber State	W 78–69	10–13 (6–9)	Dee Events Center (1,126); Ogden, UT
Feb 23, 2019; 2:05 pm		Portland State	L 57–75	10–14 (6–10)	Hornets Nest; Sacramento, CA
Feb 28, 2019; 7:05 pm		Eastern Washington	L 62–71	10–15 (6–11)	Hornets Nest (331); Sacramento, CA
Mar 2, 2019; 2:05 pm		Idaho	L 65–69	10–16 (6–12)	Hornets Nest (221); Sacramento, CA
Mar 7, 2019; 6:05 pm		at Montana State	L 58–64	10–17 (6–13)	Brick Breeden Fieldhouse (1,418); Bozeman, MT
Mar 9, 2019; 1:05 pm		at Montana	L 67–75	10–18 (6–14)	Dahlberg Arena (3,024); Missoula, MT
Big Sky Women's Tournament
Mar 11, 2019; 1:30 pm	(9)	vs. (8) Northern Arizona; First Round	L 69–74	10–19	CenturyLink Arena; Boise, ID
*Non-conference game. ^{#}Rankings from AP Poll. (#) Tournament seedings in parentheses. All times are in Pacific Time.

== See also ==
2018–19 Sacramento State Hornets men's basketball team
