= 2018–19 Eastern Washington Eagles women's basketball team =

Intercollegiate basketball season

2018–19 Eastern Washington Eagles women's basketball
- Conference: Big Sky Conference
- Record: 13–20 (9–11 Big Sky)
- Head coach: Wendy Schuller (18th season)
- Assistant coaches: Bryce Currie; Cody Bench; Nakia Arquette
- Home arena: Reese Court

2018–19 Big Sky women's basketball standings
	Conf.				Overall
Team	W		L	PCT	W		L	PCT
Idaho	16	–	4	.800	22	–	12	.647
Northern Colorado	15	–	5	.750	21	–	11	.656
Idaho State	15	–	5	.750	20	–	11	.645
Portland State †	14	–	6	.700	25	–	8	.758
Montana State	11	–	9	.550	16	–	15	.516
Eastern Washington	9	–	11	.450	13	–	20	.394
Montana	9	–	11	.450	14	–	16	.467
Northern Arizona	8	–	12	.400	13	–	18	.419
Sacramento State	6	–	14	.300	10	–	19	.345
Southern Utah	4	–	16	.200	8	–	23	.258
Weber State	3	–	17	.150	6	–	25	.194
† 2019 Big Sky tournament winner Rankings from AP poll

The 2018–19 Eastern Washington Eagles Women's basketball team represented Eastern Washington University during the 2018–19 NCAA Division I women's basketball season. The Eagles were led by eighteenth year head coach Wendy Schuller and played their home games at Reese Court. They were members of the Big Sky Conference. They finished the season 13–20, 9–11 in Big Sky play to finish in a tie for sixth place. They advanced to the championship game of the Big Sky women's tournament where they lost to Portland State.

== Roster ==
2018–19 Eastern Washington Eagles women's basketball team
Players
Coaches

Pos.	#	Name	Height	Year	Previous school	Hometown
G	0	Tatiana Reese	5 ft 5 in (1.65 m)	Fr	Woodside Priory School	East Menlo Park, CA
F	2	Uriah Howard	5 ft 11 in (1.8 m)	Jr	Miramonte HS	Oakland, CA
G	4	Jessica McDowell-White	5 ft 6 in (1.68 m)	Fr	Brisbane HS	Brisbane, Australia
G	5	Baylee Rexing	5 ft 3 in (1.6 m)	RS Sr	North Gwinnett HS	Suwanee, GA
G	10	Tessa Burke	5 ft 8 in (1.73 m)	Fr	Loyola Sacred Heart HS	Missoula, MT
G	12	Violet Kapri Morrow	5 ft 8 in (1.73 m)	Sr	Wilson HS	Tacoma, WA
C	14	Bella Cravens	6 ft 3 in (1.91 m)	Fr	Maryknoll School	Laie, HI
F	21	Milly Knowles	6 ft 1 in (1.85 m)	Fr	Myerscough College	Barrow-in-Furness, Cumbria, England
G	22	Brittany Klaman	5 ft 11 in (1.8 m)	So	Williamstown HS	Melbourne, Australia
G	23	Trinity Golder	5 ft 11 in (1.8 m)	Fr	Sandpoint HS	Sandpoint, ID
C	24	Amira Chandler	6 ft 2 in (1.88 m)	Sr	Wenatchee HS	Wenatchee, WA
F	30	Alissa Sealby	6 ft 0 in (1.83 m)	Sr	Wenatchee HS	Wenatchee, WA
G	33	Grace Kirscher	6 ft 0 in (1.83 m)	Fr	Sandpoint HS	Sandpoint, ID
C	44	Leya DePriest	6 ft 3 in (1.91 m)	Jr	Wasilla HS; Denver	Palmer, AK
C	52	Cailyn Francis	6 ft 3 in (1.91 m)	So	River Valley HS	Yuba City, CA
G	54	Andie Easley	5 ft 10 in (1.78 m)	RS Jr	Horizon HS; Hawai'i	Phoenix, AZ

Head coach

- Wendy Schuller (Fresno Pacific)

Assistant coach(es)

- Bryce Currie (Washington)
- Cody Bench (Alaska–Anchorage)
- Nakia Arquette (Utah)

Legend

- (C) Team captain
- (S) Suspended
- (I) Ineligible
- (W) Walk-on
- Injured
- Current redshirt

Roster

== Schedule ==
Date time, TV	Rank^{#}	Opponent^{#}	Result	Record	Site (attendance) city, state
Exhibition
Nov 4, 2018*; 1:05 pm		Simon Fraser	W 72–66		Reese Court; Cheney, WA
Non-conference regular season
Nov 11, 2018*; 2:05 pm, SWX		Gonzaga	L 51–63	0–1	Reese Court (1,472); Cheney, WA
Nov 14, 2018*; 6:05 pm		Eastern Oregon	W 66–45	1–1	Reese Court (281); Cheney, WA
Nov 17, 2018*; 12:00 pm		at BYU	L 65–80	1–2	Marriott Center (762); Provo, UT
Nov 21, 2018*; 4:05 pm		Utah	L 51–95	1–3	Reese Court (231); Cheney, WA
Nov 28, 2018*; 11:00 am		at Cal Poly	L 55–59	1–4	Mott Athletic Center (1,836); San Luis Obispo, CA
Dec 2, 2018*; 1:05 pm		Fresno State	L 58–68	1–5	Reese Court (288); Cheney, WA
Dec 7, 2018*; 6:00 pm		at Boise State	L 55–67	1–6	Taco Bell Arena (625); Boise, ID
Dec 14, 2018*; 9:30 pm		vs. No. 8 Oregon State; Maui Jim Maui Classic	L 45–93	1–7	Lahaina Civic Center (1,112); Lahaina, HI
Dec 15, 2018*; 7:30 pm		vs. UC Riverside; Maui Jim Maui Classic	L 45–57	1–8	Lahaina Civic Center; Lahaina, HI
Big Sky regular season
Dec 29, 2018; 1:00 pm		at Weber State	W 64–58	2–8 (1–0)	Dee Events Center (686); Ogden, UT
Dec 31, 2018; 1:00 pm		at Idaho State	L 48–63	2–9 (1–1)	Reed Gym (927); Pocatello, ID
Jan 3, 2019; 5:15 pm, SWX		at Idaho	L 68–84	2–10 (1–2)	Cowan Spectrum; Moscow, ID
Jan 7, 2019; 6:05 pm		Northern Colorado	L 62–67 ^{OT}	2–11 (1–3)	Reese Court (273); Cheney, WA
Jan 10, 2019; 6:00 pm		at Montana	W 68–62	3–11 (2–3)	Dahlberg Arena (2,636); Missoula, MT
Jan 19, 2019; 1:00 pm		at Montana State	W 89–87	4–11 (3–3)	Brick Breeden Fieldhouse (2,147); Bozeman, MT
Jan 24, 2019; 11:05 am		Portland State	L 64–76	4–12 (3–4)	Reese Court (4,124); Cheney, WA
Jan 26, 2019; 2:05 pm		Sacramento State	L 70–73	4–13 (3–5)	Reese Court (256); Cheney, WA
Jan 31, 2019; 4:30 pm		at Southern Utah	L 63–73	4–14 (3–6)	America First Events Center (834); Cedar City, UT
Feb 2, 2019; 1:00 pm		at Northern Arizona	W 64–62	5–14 (4–6)	Rolle Activity Center (505); Flagstaff, AZ
Feb 7, 2019; 6:05 pm		Montana State	L 47–61	5–15 (4–7)	Reese Court (322); Cheney, WA
Feb 9, 2019; 2:05 pm		Montana	W 67–64	6–15 (5–7)	Reese Court (389); Cheney, WA
Feb 14, 2019; 6:00 pm		at Northern Colorado	W 76–72	7–15 (6–7)	Bank of Colorado Arena (968); Greeley, CO
Feb 18, 2019; 2:05 pm, SWX		Idaho	L 74–75	7–16 (6–8)	Reese Court (462); Cheney, WA
Feb 21, 2019; 6:05 pm		Southern Utah	W 80–66	8–16 (7–8)	Reese Court (286); Cheney, WA
Feb 23, 2019; 2:05 pm		Northern Arizona	W 81–76	9–16 (8–8)	Reese Court (272); Cheney, WA
Feb 28, 2019; 7:00 pm		at Sacramento State	W 71–62	10–16 (9–8)	Hornets Nest (331); Sacramento, CA
Mar 2, 2019; 2:00 pm		at Portland State	L 57–76	10–17 (9–9)	Viking Pavilion (529); Portland, OR
Mar 7, 2018; 6:05 pm		Idaho State	L 45–74	10–18 (9–10)	Reese Court (489); Cheney, WA
Mar 9, 2018; 2:05 pm		Weber State	L 66–70	10–19 (9–11)	Reese Court (681); Cheney, WA
Big Sky Women's Tournament
Mar 11, 2019; 7:00 pm	(6)	vs. (11) Weber State; First Round	W 81–74	11–19	CenturyLink Arena; Boise, ID
Mar 12, 2019; 7:00 pm	(6)	vs. (3) Idaho State; Quarterfinals	W 67–65 ^{OT}	12–19	CenturyLink Arena; Boise, ID
Mar 13, 2019; 7:00 pm, ELVN	(6)	vs. (2) Northern Colorado; Semifinals	W 59–57	13–19	CenturyLink Arena; Boise, ID
Mar 15, 2019; 12:00 pm, ELVN	(6)	vs. (4) Portland State; Championship Game	L 59–61	13–20	CenturyLink Arena; Boise, ID
*Non-conference game. ^{#}Rankings from AP Poll. (#) Tournament seedings in parentheses. All times are in Pacific Time.

== See also ==
- 2018–19 Eastern Washington Eagles men's basketball team
