= 2018–19 Northern Arizona Lumberjacks women's basketball team =

Intercollegiate basketball season

2018–19 Northern Arizona Lumberjacks women's basketball
- Conference: Big Sky Conference
- Record: 13–18 (7–12 Big Sky)
- Head coach: Loree Payne (2nd season)
- Assistant coaches: Kellee Barney; Brandon Huntley; Jenny Thigpin
- Home arena: Walkup Skydome; Rolle Activity Center

2018–19 Big Sky women's basketball standings
	Conf.				Overall
Team	W		L	PCT	W		L	PCT
Idaho	16	–	4	.800	22	–	12	.647
Northern Colorado	15	–	5	.750	21	–	11	.656
Idaho State	15	–	5	.750	20	–	11	.645
Portland State †	14	–	6	.700	25	–	8	.758
Montana State	11	–	9	.550	16	–	15	.516
Eastern Washington	9	–	11	.450	13	–	20	.394
Montana	9	–	11	.450	14	–	16	.467
Northern Arizona	8	–	12	.400	13	–	18	.419
Sacramento State	6	–	14	.300	10	–	19	.345
Southern Utah	4	–	16	.200	8	–	23	.258
Weber State	3	–	17	.150	6	–	25	.194
† 2019 Big Sky tournament winner Rankings from AP poll

The 2018–19 Northern Arizona Lumberjacks women's basketball team represented Northern Arizona University during the 2018–19 NCAA Division I women's basketball season. The Lumberjacks, led by second-year head coach Loree Payne, played their home games at the Walkup Skydome. They were members of the Big Sky Conference.

== Roster ==
2018–19 Northern Arizona Lumberjacks women's basketball team
Players
Coaches

Pos.	#	Name	Height	Year	Previous school	Hometown
G	1	Regan Schenck	5 ft 7 in (1.7 m)	Fr	Woodinville	Woodinville, WA
G	2	Ajai Simmons (redshirt)	5 ft 10 in (1.78 m)	So	Brentwood; Illinois State	Studio City, CA
G	3	Caitlin Malvar	5 ft 9 in (1.75 m)	RS So	West Linn; Puget Sound	Portland, OR
G	4	Morgan Gary	5 ft 9 in (1.75 m)	Fr	Kentridge	Kent, WA
G	5	Alize McCormick	5 ft 8 in (1.73 m)	RS Fr	Tucson	Tucson, AZ
G/F	11	Jacey Bailey	6 ft 0 in (1.83 m)	RS So	Burnaby Mountain; Florida Atlantic	Burnaby, BC
F	15	Khiarica Rasheed	5 ft 11 in (1.8 m)	So	Grant	Portland, OR
G	20	Lauren Orndoff	5 ft 10 in (1.78 m)	So	South Medford	Medford, OR
G	21	Tate Tsingine	5 ft 10 in (1.78 m)	Sr	Tuba City; Central Arizona	Tuba City, AZ
F	23	Kaleigh Paplow	5 ft 8 in (1.73 m)	Sr	Lutheran	Parker, CO
F	25	Brianna Lehew	6 ft 1 in (1.85 m)	RS So	Thunderbird	Phoenix, AZ
F	30	Nina Radford (redshirt)	6 ft 0 in (1.83 m)	So	Grant; UC Santa Barbara	Portland, OR
F	33	Peyton Carroll	6 ft 2 in (1.88 m)	Jr	Clackamas	Damascus, OR
C	42	Molly Rohrer (redshirt)	6 ft 3 in (1.91 m)	Sr	Cherry Creek; CSU–Pueblo	Greenwood Village, CO
F	50	Sentia Bryant	6 ft 1 in (1.85 m)	Fr	Desert Ridge	Mesa, AZ

Head coach

- Loree Payne (Washington)

Assistant coach(es)

- Kellee Barney (Idaho)
- Brandon Huntley (Johnson & Wales)
- Jenny Thigpin (Fresno State)

Legend

- (C) Team captain
- (S) Suspended
- (I) Ineligible
- (W) Walk-on
- Injured
- Current redshirt

Roster

== Schedule ==
Date time, TV	Rank^{#}	Opponent^{#}	Result	Record	Site (attendance) city, state
Non-conference regular season
Nov 6, 2018*; 12:30 pm		Fresno State	W 86–73	1–0	Rolle Activity Center (705); Flagstaff, AZ
Nov 9, 2018*; 6:00 pm		at Seattle	W 65–58	2–0	Redhawk Center (435); Seattle, WA
Nov 11, 2018*; 3:00 pm		at Washington	L 59–81	2–1	Alaska Airlines Arena (1,503); Seattle, WA
Nov 17, 2018*; 7:00 pm		California Baptist	W 91–88	3–1	Rolle Activity Center (588); Flagstaff, AZ
Nov 23, 2018*; 4:00 pm		at Loyola Marymount; LMU Thanksgiving Classic semifinals	W 63–62	4–1	Gersten Pavilion (346); Los Angeles, CA
Nov 24, 2018*; 4:00 pm		vs. SMU; LMU Thanksgiving Classic championship	L 48–55	4–2	Gersten Pavilion (221); Los Angeles, CA
Dec 5, 2018*; 11:30 am		at Colorado State	L 54–65	4–3	Moby Arena (2,434); Fort Collins, CO
Dec 8, 2018*; 2:00 pm, KASW		New Mexico	L 55–84	4–4	Walkup Skydome (406); Flagstaff, AZ
Dec 21, 2018*; 6:30 pm		at Arizona	L 47–71	4–5	McKale Center (1,866); Tucson, AZ
Big Sky regular season
Dec 29, 2018; 2:00 pm		at Montana	L 62–78	4–6 (0–1)	Dahlberg Arena (3,031); Missoula, MT
Dec 31, 2018; 4:00 pm		at Montana State	L 70–80	4–7 (0–2)	Brick Breeden Fieldhouse (1,359); Bozeman, MT
Jan 3, 2019; 6:30 pm		Weber State	W 74–64	5–7 (1–2)	Walkup Skydome (178); Flagstaff, AZ
Jan 5, 2019; 2:00 pm		Idaho State	L 69–80	5–8 (1–3)	Walkup Skydome (271); Flagstaff, AZ
Jan 12, 2019; 2:00 pm, KASW		Southern Utah	L 76–82 ^{OT}	5–9 (1–4)	Walkup Skydome (215); Flagstaff, AZ
Jan 17, 2019; 1:00 pm		at Sacramento State	L 61–65	5–10 (1–5)	Hornets Nest (607); Sacramento, CA
Jan 19, 2019; 3:00 pm		at Portland State	L 55–72	5–11 (1–6)	Viking Pavilion (541); Portland, OR
Jan 26, 2019; 3:00 pm		at Northern Colorado	L 53–63	5–12 (1–7)	Bank of Colorado Arena (1,339); Greeley, CO
Jan 28, 2019; 6:30 pm		at Southern Utah	W 78–69	6–12 (2–7)	America First Events Center (904); Cedar City, UT
Jan 31, 2019; 6:30 pm		Idaho	L 69–86	6–13 (2–8)	Walkup Skydome (419); Flagstaff, AZ
Feb 2, 2019; 2:00 pm		Eastern Washington	L 62–64	6–14 (2–9)	Rolle Activity Center (505); Flagstaff, AZ
Feb 7, 2019; 7:00 pm		at Idaho State	W 81–77	7–14 (3–9)	Reed Gym (935); Pocatello, ID
Feb 9, 2019; 2:00 pm		at Weber State	W 75–64	8–14 (4–9)	Dee Events Center (576); Ogden, UT
Feb 14, 2019; 6:30 pm		Portland State	L 59–74	8–15 (4–10)	Walkup Skydome (202); Flagstaff, AZ
Feb 16, 2019; 2:00 pm, KASW		Sacramento State	W 71–69	9–15 (5–10)	Walkup Skydome (298); Flagstaff, AZ
Feb 21, 2019; 7:00 pm		at Idaho	L 72–90	9–16 (5–11)	Cowan Spectrum (420); Moscow, ID
Feb 23, 2019; 3:00 pm		at Eastern Washington	L 76–81	9–17 (5–12)	Reese Court (272); Cheney, WA
Mar 2, 2019; 2:00 pm, KASW		Montana State	W 76–72	10–17 (6–12)	Walkup Skydome (370); Flagstaff, AZ
Mar 4, 2019; 6:30 pm		Montana	W 82–65	11–17 (7–12)	Walkup Skydome (450); Flagstaff, AZ
Mar 9, 2019; 2:00 pm		Northern Colorado	W 79–68	12–17 (8–12)	Walkup Skydome (461); Flagstaff, AZ
Big Sky Women's Tournament
Mar 11, 2019; 1:30 pm	(8)	vs. (9) Sacramento State; First Round	W 74–69	13–17	CenturyLink Arena; Boise, ID
Mar 12, 2019; 11:00 am	(8)	vs. (1) Idaho; Quarterfinals	L 73–90	13–18	CenturyLink Arena; Boise, ID
*Non-conference game. ^{#}Rankings from AP Poll. (#) Tournament seedings in parentheses. All times are in Mountain Time.

== See also ==
- 2018–19 Northern Arizona Lumberjacks men's basketball team
