= 2018–19 Idaho Vandals women's basketball team =

Intercollegiate basketball season

2018–19 Idaho Vandals women's basketball

Big Sky regular-season champions

WNIT, third round
- Conference: Big Sky Conference
- Record: 22–12 (16–4 Big Sky)
- Head coach: Jon Newlee (11th season)
- Assistant coaches: Christa Stanford; Jeri Jacobson; Drew Muscatell
- Home arena: Cowan Spectrum; Memorial Gym

2018–19 Big Sky women's basketball standings
	Conf.				Overall
Team	W		L	PCT	W		L	PCT
Idaho	16	–	4	.800	22	–	12	.647
Northern Colorado	15	–	5	.750	21	–	11	.656
Idaho State	15	–	5	.750	20	–	11	.645
Portland State †	14	–	6	.700	25	–	8	.758
Montana State	11	–	9	.550	16	–	15	.516
Eastern Washington	9	–	11	.450	13	–	20	.394
Montana	9	–	11	.450	14	–	16	.467
Northern Arizona	8	–	12	.400	13	–	18	.419
Sacramento State	6	–	14	.300	10	–	19	.345
Southern Utah	4	–	16	.200	8	–	23	.258
Weber State	3	–	17	.150	6	–	25	.194
† 2019 Big Sky tournament winner Rankings from AP poll

The 2018–19 Idaho Vandals women's basketball team represented the University of Idaho during the 2018–19 NCAA Division I women's basketball season. The Vandals, led by eleventh-year head coach Jon Newlee, played their home games at the Cowan Spectrum with early-season games at Memorial Gym, in Moscow, Idaho, and were members of the Big Sky Conference. They finished the season 22–12, 16–4 in Big Sky play, to win the Big Sky regular-season championship. They advanced to the semifinals of the Big Sky women's tournament, where they lost to Portland State. They received an automatic bid to the Women's National Invitation Tournament, where they defeated Loyola Marymount and Denver in the first and second rounds, respectively, before losing to Arizona in the third round.

== Roster ==
2018–19 Idaho Vandals women's basketball team
Players
Coaches

Pos.	#	Name	Height	Year	Previous school	Hometown
C	3	Nina Carlson	6 ft 3 in (1.91 m)	So	Lake City	Post Falls, ID
G/F	4	Hailey Christopher	6 ft 0 in (1.83 m)	Fr	Central Valley	Spokane, WA
G	5	Juliet Jones	5 ft 9 in (1.75 m)	RS Sr	Cathedral Catholic; Cal State San Marcos	San Diego, CA
C	11	Isabelle Hadden	6 ft 4 in (1.93 m)	Jr	Boise	Boise, ID
G	14	Taylor Pierce	5 ft 7 in (1.7 m)	Sr	La Costa Canyon	Carlsbad, CA
G	20	Allison Kirby	5 ft 7 in (1.7 m)	So	Timberlake	Spirit Lake, ID
G	21	Mikayla Ferenz	5 ft 10 in (1.78 m)	Sr	Walla Walla	Walla Walla, WA
G	23	Gina Marxen	5 ft 8 in (1.73 m)	Fr	Eastlake	Sammamish, WA
G	32	Chayse Milne	5 ft 10 in (1.78 m)	Fr	Maryknoll	Honolulu, HI
G	33	Lizzy Klinker (redshirt)	5 ft 10 in (1.78 m)	Jr	Fairfield; Utah State	Fairfield, MT
C	42	Natalie Klinker	6 ft 1 in (1.85 m)	So	Fairfield	Fairfield, MT

Head coach

- Jon Newlee (San Diego State)

Assistant coach(es)

- Christa Stanford (Idaho State)
- Jeri Jacobson (Upper Iowa)
- Drew Muscatell (Oregon)

Legend

- (C) Team captain
- (S) Suspended
- (I) Ineligible
- (W) Walk-on
- Injured
- Current redshirt

Roster
Last update: March 26, 2025

== Schedule ==
Date time, TV	Rank^{#}	Opponent^{#}	Result	Record	Site (attendance) city, state
Exhibition
October 28, 2018*; 4:00 p.m.		Saint Martin's	W 108–84		Memorial Gym; Moscow, ID
November 2, 2018*; 5:30 p.m.		Lewis–Clark State	W 97–55		Memorial Gym; Moscow, ID
Non-conference regular season
November 6, 2018*; 6:00 p.m.		Cal State Northridge	W 88–73	1–0	Memorial Gym (286); Moscow, ID
November 11, 2018*; 2:00 p.m.		at No. 7 Stanford	L 71–115	1–1	Maples Pavilion (2,582); Stanford, CA
November 17, 2018*; 1:00 p.m.		at Texas Tech	W 88–77	2–1	United Supermarkets Arena (3,109); Lubbock, TX
November 23, 2018*; 5:00 p.m.		vs. Boise State; Beach Classic	L 85–91	2–2	Walter Pyramid; Long Beach, CA
November 23, 2018*; 4:00 p.m.		at Long Beach State; Beach Classic	L 63–70	2–3	Walter Pyramid (640); Long Beach, CA
December 1, 2018*; 2:00 p.m.		San Francisco	W 70–63	3–3	Memorial Gym (400); Moscow, ID
December 5, 2018*; 9:00 p.m.		at Hawaii	L 61–69	3–4	Stan Sheriff Center (1,233); Honolulu, HI
December 8, 2018*; 12:00 p.m.		at Wyoming	L 61–64	3–5	Arena-Auditorium (2,551); Laramie, WY
December 20, 2018*; 6:00 p.m.		at No. 21 Gonzaga	L 51–88	3–6	McCarthey Athletic Center (5,795); Spokane, WA
Big Sky regular season
December 29, 2018; 1:00 p.m.		at Idaho State	W 86–72	4–6 (1–0)	Reed Gym (946); Pocatello, ID
December 31, 2018; 1:00 p.m.		at Weber State	W 79–74	5–6 (2–0)	Dee Events Center (439); Ogden, UT
January 3, 2019; 5:15 p.m.		Eastern Washington	W 84–68	6–6 (3–0)	Cowan Spectrum; Moscow, ID
January 5, 2019; 2:00 p.m.		Northern Colorado	L 72–86	6–7 (3–1)	Cowan Spectrum (415); Moscow, ID
January 10, 2019; 6:00 p.m.		at Montana State	W 82–66	7–7 (4–1)	Brick Breeden Fieldhouse (1,558); Bozeman, MT
January 19, 2019; 1:00 p.m.		at Montana	L 79–82	7–8 (4–2)	Dahlberg Arena (2,795); Missoula, MT
January 24, 2019; 6:00 p.m.		Sacramento State	W 104–66	8–8 (5–2)	Cowan Spectrum (520); Moscow, ID
January 26, 2019; 2:00 p.m.		Portland State	W 80–78	9–8 (6–2)	Cowan Spectrum (556); Moscow, ID
January 31, 2019; 5:30 p.m.		at Northern Arizona	W 86–69	10–8 (7–2)	Walkup Skydome (419); Flagstaff, AZ
February 2, 2019; 1:00 p.m.		at Southern Utah	W 82–70	11–8 (8–2)	America First Events Center (644); Cedar City, UT
February 7, 2019; 6:00 p.m.		Montana	W 76–68	12–8 (9–2)	Cowan Spectrum (613); Moscow, ID
February 9, 2019; 2:00 p.m.		Montana State	W 90–65	13–8 (10–2)	Cowan Spectrum (500); Moscow, ID
February 16, 2019; 1:00 p.m.		at Northern Colorado	L 72–77	13–9 (10–3)	Bank of Colorado Arena (1,547); Greeley, CO
February 18, 2019; 2:00 p.m.		at Eastern Washington	W 75–74	14–9 (11–3)	Reese Court (462); Cheney, WA
February 21, 2019; 6:00 p.m.		Northern Arizona	W 90–72	15–9 (12–3)	Cowan Spectrum (420); Moscow, ID
February 23, 2019; 1:00 p.m.		Southern Utah	W 77–49	16–9 (13–3)	Cowan Spectrum (508); Moscow, ID
February 28, 2019; 7:00 p.m.		at Portland State	W 81–68	17–9 (14–3)	Viking Pavilion (889); Portland, OR
March 2, 2019; 2:00 p.m.		at Sacramento State	W 69–65	18–9 (15–3)	Hornets Nest (221); Sacramento, CA
March 7, 2019; 6:00 p.m.		Weber State	W 86–78	19–9 (16–3)	Cowan Spectrum (653); Moscow, ID
March 9, 2019; 2:00 p.m.		Idaho State	L 67–73	19–10 (16–4)	Cowan Spectrum (723); Moscow, ID
Big Sky women's tournament
March 12, 2019; 11:00 a.m.	(1)	vs. (8) Northern Arizona; Quarterfinals	W 90–73	20–10	CenturyLink Arena; Boise, ID
March 13, 2019; 5:30 p.m., ELVN	(1)	vs. (4) Portland State; Semifinals	L 59–75	20–11	CenturyLink Arena; Boise, ID
WNIT
March 21, 2019*; 7:00 p.m.		at Loyola Marymount; First round	W 79–64	21–11	Gersten Pavilion (315); Los Angeles, CA
March 24, 2019*; 2:00 p.m.		Denver; Second round	W 88–66	22–11	Memorial Gym (1,230); Moscow, ID
March 28, 2019*; 6:30 p.m.		at Arizona; Third round	L 60–68	22–12	McKale Center (6,307); Tucson, AZ
*Non-conference game. ^{#}Rankings from AP poll. (#) Tournament seedings in parentheses. All times are in Pacific.

== See also ==
- 2018–19 Idaho Vandals men's basketball team
