= 2018–19 Southern Utah Thunderbirds women's basketball team =

Intercollegiate basketball season

2018–19 Southern Utah Thunderbirds women's basketball
- Conference: Big Sky Conference
- Record: 8–23 (4–16 Big Sky)
- Head coach: Tracy Sanders (1st season)
- Assistant coaches: Hailey Mandelko; Jay Johnson; Morgan Bailey
- Home arena: America First Events Center

2018–19 Big Sky women's basketball standings
	Conf.				Overall
Team	W		L	PCT	W		L	PCT
Idaho	16	–	4	.800	22	–	12	.647
Northern Colorado	15	–	5	.750	21	–	11	.656
Idaho State	15	–	5	.750	20	–	11	.645
Portland State †	14	–	6	.700	25	–	8	.758
Montana State	11	–	9	.550	16	–	15	.516
Eastern Washington	9	–	11	.450	13	–	20	.394
Montana	9	–	11	.450	14	–	16	.467
Northern Arizona	8	–	12	.400	13	–	18	.419
Sacramento State	6	–	14	.300	10	–	19	.345
Southern Utah	4	–	16	.200	8	–	23	.258
Weber State	3	–	17	.150	6	–	25	.194
† 2019 Big Sky tournament winner Rankings from AP poll

The 2018–19 Southern Utah Thunderbirds women's basketball team represented Southern Utah University during the 2018–19 NCAA Division I women's basketball season. The Thunderbirds are led by first-year head coach Tracy Sanders and play their home games at America First Events Center. They are members of the Big Sky Conference.

== Roster ==
2018–19 Southern Utah Thunderbirds women's basketball team
Players
Coaches

Pos.	#	Name	Height	Year	Previous school	Hometown
G	2	Rebecca Cardenas	5 ft 5 in (1.65 m)	Jr	Burges	El Paso, TX
G/F	4	Ashley Larsen	6 ft 0 in (1.83 m)	RS Jr	American Fork; Utah Valley	American Fork, UT
G	10	Claudia Armato	5 ft 5 in (1.65 m)	Fr	Penleigh and Essendon Grammar	Melbourne, Australia
F	11	Megan Kamps	6 ft 0 in (1.83 m)	RS So	Manhattan Christian	Manhattan, MT
G/F	12	Chloe Bradford	5 ft 10 in (1.78 m)	Jr	Minico; Treasure Valley CC	Heyburn, ID
G	14	Breanu Reid	5 ft 7 in (1.7 m)	Sr	Piedmont	Oklahoma City, OK
G/F	15	Geassy Germano	6 ft 0 in (1.83 m)	Fr	Friendship Christian School	Americana, São Paulo, Brazil
G	21	Kiana Johnson	5 ft 10 in (1.78 m)	RS So	Northridge; Northern Colorado	Tuscaloosa, AL
G/F	23	Harley Hansen	5 ft 9 in (1.75 m)	Jr	Fremont; Snow College	West Weber, UT
F	24	Jessica Chatman	6 ft 0 in (1.83 m)	RS So	Union; BYU	Ridgefield, WA
G	25	Peyton Torgerson	5 ft 10 in (1.78 m)	RS Fr	North Sevier	Salina, UT
C	30	Carlie Jones	6 ft 3 in (1.91 m)	So	Dallas Christian	Forney, TX
C	34	Hannah Robins	6 ft 3 in (1.91 m)	Fr	Juab	Nephi, UT

Head coach

- Tracy Sanders (Saint Mary's)

Assistant coach(es)

- Hailey Mandelko (Southern Utah)
- Jay Johnson (Saint Mary's)
- Morgan Bailey (BYU)

Legend

- (C) Team captain
- (S) Suspended
- (I) Ineligible
- (W) Walk-on
- Injured
- Current redshirt

Roster

== Schedule and results ==
Date time, TV	Rank^{#}	Opponent^{#}	Result	Record	Site (attendance) city, state
Non-conference regular season
Nov 7, 2018*; 6:30 pm		San Diego	W 69–59	1–0	America First Events Center (784); Cedar City, UT
Nov 15, 2018*; 8:00 pm		at UC Riverside	L 50–56	1–1	SRC Arena (100); Riverside, CA
Nov 20, 2018*; 8:00 pm		at UC Irvine	L 58–75	1–2	Bren Events Center (302); Irvine, CA
Nov 23, 2018*; 6:00 pm		at UC Davis	L 45–68	1–3	The Pavilion (433); Davis, CA
Nov 27, 2018*; 6:30 pm		BYU; Old Oquirrh Bucket	W 67–64	2–3	America First Events Center (1,021); Cedar City, UT
Dec 1, 2018*; 1:00 pm		at Oral Roberts	L 59–64	2–4	Mabee Center (976); Tulsa, OK
Dec 4, 2018*; 12:00 pm		Utah Valley; Old Oquirrh Bucket	W 60–59	3–4	America First Events Center (862); Cedar City, UT
Dec 8, 2018*; 1:00 pm		Denver	L 70–71	3–5	America First Events Center (857); Cedar City, UT
Dec 19, 2018*; 5:30 pm		at Boise State	L 53–88	3–6	Taco Bell Arena; Boise, ID
Big Sky regular season
Dec 29, 2018; 7:00 pm		at Montana State	L 64–69	3–7 (0–1)	Brick Breeden Fieldhouse (1,616); Bozeman, MT
Dec 31, 2018; 2:00 pm		at Montana	L 57–79	3–8 (0–2)	Dahlberg Arena (2,930); Missoula, MT
Jan 3, 2019; 6:30 pm		Idaho State	L 57–69	3–9 (0–3)	American First Events Center (603); Cedar City, UT
Jan 5, 2019; 2:00 pm		Weber State	W 84–79 ^{OT}	4–9 (1–3)	American First Events Center (568); Cedar City, UT
Jan 12, 2019; 2:00 pm		at Northern Arizona	W 82–76 ^{OT}	5–9 (2–3)	Walkup Skydome (215); Flagstaff, AZ
Jan 17, 2019; 8:00 pm		at Portland State	L 49–63	5–10 (2–4)	Viking Pavilion (537); Portland, OR
Jan 19, 2019; 3:00 pm		at Sacramento State	L 76–77	5–11 (2–5)	Hornets Nest (477); Sacramento, CA
Jan 24, 2019; 6:30 pm		Northern Colorado	L 44–71	5–12 (2–6)	American First Events Center (647); Cedar City, UT
Jan 28, 2019; 6:30 pm		Northern Arizona	L 69–78	5–13 (2–7)	American First Events Center (904); Cedar City, UT
Jan 31, 2019; 6:30 pm		Eastern Washington	W 73–63	6–13 (3–7)	American First Events Center (834); Cedar City, UT
Feb 2, 2019; 2:00 pm		Idaho	L 70–82	6–14 (3–8)	American First Events Center (644); Cedar City, UT
Feb 7, 2019; 12:00 pm		at Weber State	L 66–67	6–15 (3–9)	Dee Events Center (1,532); Ogden, UT
Feb 9, 2019; 2:00 pm		at Idaho State	L 47–80	6–16 (3–10)	Reed Gym (1,146); Pocatello, ID
Feb 14, 2019; 6:30 pm		Sacramento State	L 69–75 ^{OT}	6–17 (3–11)	America First Events Center (669); Cedar City, UT
Feb 16, 2019; 2:00 pm		Portland State	L 56–81	6–18 (3–12)	America First Events Center (463); Cedar City, UT
Feb 21, 2019; 7:05 pm		at Eastern Washington	L 66–80	6–19 (3–13)	Reese Court (286); Cheney, WA
Feb 23, 2019; 3:00 pm		at Idaho	L 49–77	6–20 (3–14)	Cowan Spectrum (508); Moscow, ID
Mar 2, 2019; 2:00 pm		Montana	W 71–56	7–20 (4–14)	America First Events Center (621); Cedar City, UT
Mar 4, 2019; 6:30 pm		Montana State	L 55–70	7–21 (4–15)	America First Events Center (753); Cedar City, UT
Mar 7, 2019; 7:00 pm		at Northern Colorado	L 71–88	7–22 (4–16)	Bank of Colorado Arena (1,328); Greeley, CO
Big Sky Women's Tournament
Mar 11, 2019; 5:30 pm	(7)	vs. (10) Montana; First Round	W 64–56	8–22	CenturyLink Arena; Boise, ID
Mar 12, 2019; 5:30 pm	(7)	vs. (2) Northern Colorado; Quarterfinals	L 50–82	8–23	CenturyLink Arena; Boise, ID
*Non-conference game. ^{#}Rankings from AP Poll. (#) Tournament seedings in parentheses. All times are in Mountain Time.

== See also ==
- 2018–19 Southern Utah Thunderbirds men's basketball team
