= 2018–19 Idaho State Bengals women's basketball team =

Intercollegiate basketball season

2018–19 Idaho State Bengals women's basketball
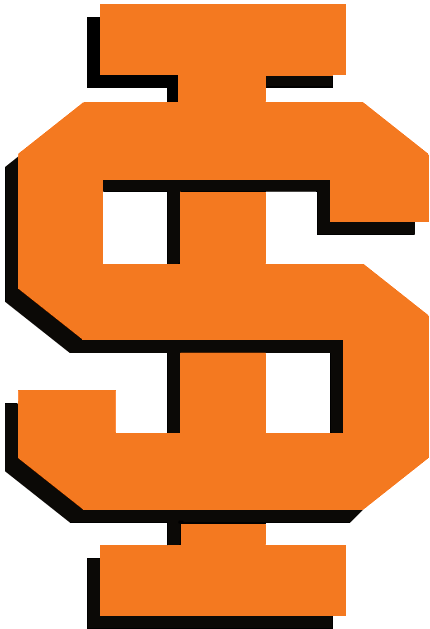

WNIT, first round
- Conference: Big Sky Conference
- Record: 20–11 (15–5 Big Sky)
- Head coach: Seton Sobolewski (11th season)
- Assistant coaches: Ryan Johnson; Bryanna Mueller; D'Shara Strange
- Home arena: Reed Gym

2018–19 Big Sky women's basketball standings
	Conf.				Overall
Team	W		L	PCT	W		L	PCT
Idaho	16	–	4	.800	22	–	12	.647
Northern Colorado	15	–	5	.750	21	–	11	.656
Idaho State	15	–	5	.750	20	–	11	.645
Portland State †	14	–	6	.700	25	–	8	.758
Montana State	11	–	9	.550	16	–	15	.516
Eastern Washington	9	–	11	.450	13	–	20	.394
Montana	9	–	11	.450	14	–	16	.467
Northern Arizona	8	–	12	.400	13	–	18	.419
Sacramento State	6	–	14	.300	10	–	19	.345
Southern Utah	4	–	16	.200	8	–	23	.258
Weber State	3	–	17	.150	6	–	25	.194
† 2019 Big Sky tournament winner Rankings from AP poll

The 2018–19 Idaho State Bengals women's basketball team represented Idaho State University during the 2018–19 NCAA Division I women's basketball season. The Bengals, led by eleventh-year head coach Seton Sobolewski, played their home games at Reed Gym. They were members of the Big Sky Conference. They finished the season 20–11, 15–5 in Big Sky play, to finish in a tie for second place. They lost in the semifinals of the Big Sky women's tournament to Eastern Washington. They received an at-large bid to the WNIT where they lost to Arizona in the first round.

== Roster ==
2018–19 Idaho State Bengals women's basketball team
Players
Coaches

Pos.	#	Name	Height	Year	Previous school	Hometown
G	1	Nuria Barrientos	5 ft 11 in (1.8 m)	RS Fr	Draft Gramenet	Barcelona, Spain
G	2	Grace Kenyon	6 ft 0 in (1.83 m)	RS Sr	Bainbridge HS	Bainbridge Island, WA
G	3	Saylair Grandon	5 ft 10 in (1.78 m)	Sr	Westview HS	Phoenix, AZ
G	4	Madison Hinrichs	5 ft 7 in (1.7 m)	Sr	Port Angeles HS; Lower Columbia	Longview, WA
G	5	Dora Goles	5 ft 7 in (1.7 m)	Jr	KK Split; Western Wyoming	Split, Croatia
F	11	Sai Tapasa	6 ft 2 in (1.88 m)	RS Jr	Central HS	Monmouth, OR
G	12	Callie Bourne	5 ft 9 in (1.75 m)	Fr	Daramalan College	Canberra, Australia
F	13	Ellie Smith	6 ft 2 in (1.88 m)	RS Fr	Southridge HS	Kennewick, WA
F	14	Estefania Ors	5 ft 10 in (1.78 m)	RS Jr	Valencia BC	Altura, Spain
F	15	Irene Vicente	6 ft 2 in (1.88 m)	Jr	Rivas Promete Junior	Alcalá de Henares, Spain
F	22	Delaney Moore	6 ft 0 in (1.83 m)	So	Monte Vista Christian	Gilroy, CA
G	24	Melisa Kadic	5 ft 9 in (1.75 m)	Jr	Granger HS; Western Nebraska CC	West Valley, UT
F	25	Montana Oltrogge	6 ft 0 in (1.83 m)	Fr	Xavier HS	Phoenix, AZ
F	34	Kaitlyn Bell	6 ft 3 in (1.91 m)	RS Fr	Rigby HS	Rigby, ID

Head coach

- Seton Sobolewski (Northern Arizona)

Assistant coach(es)

- Ryan Johnson (DePauw)
- Bryanna Mueller (Drake)
- D'Shara Strange (Northern Colorado)

Legend

- (C) Team captain
- (S) Suspended
- (I) Ineligible
- (W) Walk-on
- Injured
- Current redshirt

Roster
Last update: July 21, 2024

== Schedule ==
Date time, TV	Rank^{#}	Opponent^{#}	Result	Record	Site (attendance) city, state
Exhibition
November 3, 2018*; 2:00 p.m.		Chico State	W 85–49		Reed Gym; Pocatello, ID
Non-conference regular season
November 7, 2018*; 7:00 p.m.		at California Baptist	W 72–57	1–0	CBU Events Center (1,090); Riverside, CA
November 9, 2018*; 6:30 p.m.		at Arizona	L 46–71	1–1	McKale Center (1,226); Tucson, AZ
November 13, 2018*; 6:00 p.m.		at Gonzaga	L 51–70	1–2	McCarthey Athletic Center (5,019); Spokane, WA
November 19, 2018*; 7:00 p.m.		at Utah	L 60–74	1–3	Jon M. Huntsman Center (1,749); Salt Lake City, UT
November 22, 2018*; 7:00 p.m.		vs. Kennesaw State; Cancún Challenge Riviera Division	W 60–49	2–3	Hard Rock Hotel Riviera Maya (300); Cancún, Mexico
November 23, 2018*; 4:30 p.m.		vs. Georgia Tech; Cancún Challenge Riviera Division	L 51–74	2–4	Hard Rock Hotel Riviera Maya (300); Cancún, Mexico
November 29, 2018*; 11:00 a.m.		Benedictine Mesa	W 88–51	3–4	Reed Gym (2,075); Pocatello, ID
December 6, 2018*; 7:00 p.m.		Utah Valley	W 80–68	4–4	Reed Gym (815); Pocatello, ID
December 8, 2018*; 2:00 p.m.		Pepperdine	W 65–63	5–4	Reed Gym (828); Pocatello, ID
Big Sky regular season
December 29, 2018; 2:00 p.m.		Idaho	L 72–86	5–5 (0–1)	Reed Gym (946); Pocatello, ID
December 31, 2018; 6:00 p.m.		Eastern Washington	W 63–48	6–5 (1–1)	Reed Gym (927); Pocatello, ID
January 3, 2019; 6:30 p.m.		at Southern Utah	W 69–57	7–5 (2–1)	America First Events Center (603); Cedar City, UT
January 5, 2019; 2:30 p.m.		at Northern Arizona	W 80–69	8–5 (3–1)	Walkup Skydome (271); Flagstaff, AZ
January 10, 2019; 7:00 p.m.		at Weber State	W 70–57	9–5 (4–1)	Dee Events Center (491); Ogden, UT
January 12, 2019; 2:00 p.m.		Sacramento State	W 73–43	10–5 (5–1)	Reed Gym (987); Pocatello, ID
January 19, 2019; 7:00 p.m.		at Northern Colorado	L 56–60	10–6 (5–2)	Bank of Colorado Arena (1,237); Greeley, CO
January 24, 2019; 7:00 p.m.		Montana	W 50–34	11–6 (6–2)	Reed Gym (981); Pocatello, ID
January 26, 2019; 2:00 p.m.		Montana State	W 61–43	12–6 (7–2)	Reed Gym (1,092); Pocatello, ID
January 31, 2019; 8:05 p.m.		at Sacramento State	W 56–42	13–6 (8–2)	Hornets Nest (261); Sacramento, CA
February 2, 2019; 3:00 p.m.		at Portland State	W 58–57	14–6 (9–2)	Viking Pavilion (527); Portland, OR
February 7, 2019; 6:00 p.m.		Northern Arizona	L 77–81	14–7 (9–3)	Reed Gym (935); Pocatello, ID
February 9, 2019; 2:00 p.m.		Southern Utah	W 80–47	15–7 (10–3)	Reed Gym (1,146); Pocatello, ID
February 14, 2019; 7:00 p.m.		at Montana State	W 62–49	16–7 (11–3)	Brick Breeden Fieldhouse (1,176); Bozeman, MT
February 16, 2019; 2:00 p.m.		at Montana	L 59–60	16–8 (11–4)	Dahlberg Arena (2,730); Missoula, MT
February 21, 2019; 7:00 p.m.		Portland State	W 72–54	17–8 (12–4)	Reed Gym (874); Pocatello, ID
February 23, 2019; 2:00 p.m.		Weber State	W 84–57	18–8 (13–4)	Reed Gym (1,047); Pocatello, ID
February 28, 2019; 7:00 p.m.		Northern Colorado	L 59–61	18–9 (13–5)	Reed Gym (1,128); Pocatello, ID
March 7, 2019; 7:00 p.m.		at Eastern Washington	W 74–45	19–9 (14–5)	Reese Court (489); Cheney, WA
March 9, 2019; 3:00 p.m.		at Idaho	W 73–67	20–9 (15–5)	Cowan Spectrum (723); Moscow, ID
Big Sky women's tournament
March 12, 2019; 8:00 p.m.	(3)	vs. (6) Eastern Washington; Quarterfinals	L 65–67 ^{OT}	20–10	CenturyLink Arena; Boise, ID
WNIT
March 21, 2019*; 7:30 p.m.		at Arizona; First round	L 56–66	20–11	McKale Center (3,265); Tucson, AZ
*Non-conference game. ^{#}Rankings from AP poll. (#) Tournament seedings in parentheses. All times are in Mountain.

== See also ==
- 2018–19 Idaho State Bengals men's basketball team
