= 2018–19 Northern Colorado Bears women's basketball team =

Intercollegiate basketball season

2018–19 Northern Colorado Bears women's basketball
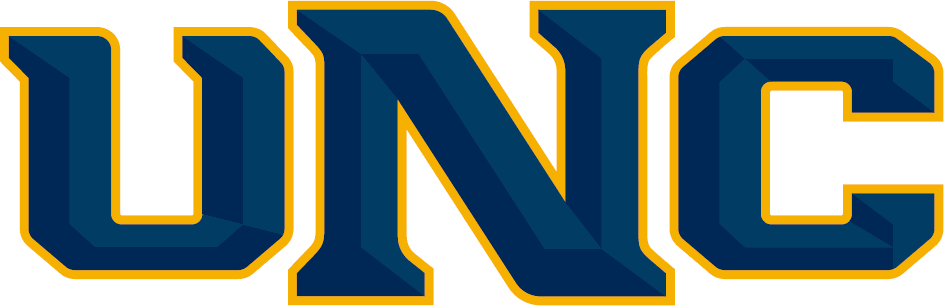

WNIT, First Round
- Conference: Big Sky Conference
- Record: 21–11 (15–5 Big Sky)
- Head coach: Jenny Huth (1st season)
- Assistant coaches: Christian Blanks; Kari Korver; Jana Pearson
- Home arena: Bank of Colorado Arena

2018–19 Big Sky women's basketball standings
	Conf.				Overall
Team	W		L	PCT	W		L	PCT
Idaho	16	–	4	.800	22	–	12	.647
Northern Colorado	15	–	5	.750	21	–	11	.656
Idaho State	15	–	5	.750	20	–	11	.645
Portland State †	14	–	6	.700	25	–	8	.758
Montana State	11	–	9	.550	16	–	15	.516
Eastern Washington	9	–	11	.450	13	–	20	.394
Montana	9	–	11	.450	14	–	16	.467
Northern Arizona	8	–	12	.400	13	–	18	.419
Sacramento State	6	–	14	.300	10	–	19	.345
Southern Utah	4	–	16	.200	8	–	23	.258
Weber State	3	–	17	.150	6	–	25	.194
† 2019 Big Sky tournament winner Rankings from AP poll

The 2018–19 Northern Colorado Bears women's basketball team represented the University of Northern Colorado during the 2018–19 NCAA Division I women's basketball season. The Bears were led by first year head coach Jenny Huth, played their home games at the Bank of Colorado Arena as members of the Big Sky Conference. They finished the season 21–11, 15–5 in Big Sky play to finish in a tie for second place. They advanced to the semifinals of the Big Sky women's tournament where they lost to Eastern Washington. They received an at-large bid to the WNIT where they lost to Wyoming in the first round.

== Roster ==
2018–19 Northern Colorado Bears women's basketball team
Players
Coaches

Pos.	#	Name	Height	Year	Previous school	Hometown
G	0	Shian Hanks	5 ft 6 in (1.68 m)	Fr	Peyton HS	Peyton, CO
G	1	Krystal Leger-Walker	5 ft 9 in (1.75 m)	Jr		Waikato, New Zealand
G	3	Brooklyn Evans	5 ft 7 in (1.7 m)	Fr	Red Oak HS	Red Oak, TX
G	10	Savannah Smith	5 ft 6 in (1.68 m)	RS Sr	Fossil Ridge HS	Fort Collins, CO
G	15	Shian Hanks	5 ft 10 in (1.78 m)	Sr	Flowing Wells HS; Pima CC	Tucson, AZ
G	20	Alexis Chapman	5 ft 7 in (1.7 m)	So	North Garland HS	Garland, TX
G	21	Abby Kain	6 ft 1 in (1.85 m)	Jr	Simley HS	Inver Grove Heights, MN
G/F	22	Micayla Isenbart	5 ft 11 in (1.8 m)	Fr	Kit Carson HS	Stratton, CO
F/C	24	Ali Meyer	6 ft 1 in (1.85 m)	RS Sr	Palmer Ridge HS; Colorado Christian	Monument, CO
C	44	Bridget Hintz	6 ft 3 in (1.91 m)	Jr	Elk Rapids HS	Elk Rapids, MI

Head coach

- Jenny Huth (Colorado)

Assistant coach(es)

- Christian Blanks (Hampton)
- Kari Korver (UCLA)
- Jana Pearson (Harding)

Legend

- (C) Team captain
- (S) Suspended
- (I) Ineligible
- (W) Walk-on
- Injured
- Current redshirt

Roster

== Schedule and results ==
Date time, TV	Rank^{#}	Opponent^{#}	Result	Record	Site (attendance) city, state
Exhibition
Nov 2, 2018*; 7:00 pm		South Dakota Mines	W 71–39		Bank of Colorado Arena (991); Greeley, CO
Non-conference regular season
Nov 6, 2018*; 7:00 pm		at Colorado	L 69–77	0–1	CU Events Center (1,384); Boulder, CO
Nov 11, 2018*; 12:00 pm		at LSU	L 57–62	0–2	Maravich Center (1,805); Baton Rouge, LA
Nov 16, 2018*; 7:00 pm		Denver	W 74–66	1–2	Bank of Colorado Arena (1,162); Greeley, CO
Nov 20, 2018*; 7:00 pm		at Colorado State	W 53–47	2–2	Moby Arena (1,145); Fort Collins, CO
Nov 23, 2018*; 3:00 pm		at San Francisco	W 68–63	3–2	War Memorial Gymnasium (263); San Francisco, CA
Nov 28, 2018*; 5:00 pm		at Air Force	L 57–69	3–3	Clune Arena (446); Colorado Springs, CO
Dec 1, 2018*; 2:00 pm		SMU	W 58–57	4–3	Bank of Colorado Arena (1,145); Greeley, CO
Dec 13, 2018*; 7:00 pm		Chattanooga	W 68–65	5–3	Bank of Colorado Arena (741); Greeley, CO
Dec 21, 2018*; 12:00 pm		at BYU	L 50–70	5–4	Marriott Center (681); Provo, UT
Big Sky regular season
Dec 29, 2018; 2:00 pm		Sacramento State	W 82–69	6–4 (1–0)	Bank of Colorado Arena (1,063); Greeley, CO
Dec 31, 2018; 6:00 pm		Portland State	W 79–63	7–4 (2–0)	Bank of Colorado Arena (931); Greeley, CO
Jan 5, 2019; 3:00 pm		at Idaho	W 86–72	8–4 (3–0)	Cowan Spectrum (415); Moscow, ID
Jan 7, 2019; 7:00 pm		at Eastern Washington	W 67–62 ^{OT}	9–4 (4–0)	Reese Court (273); Cheney, WA
Jan 12, 2019; 2:00 pm		at Montana	W 73–62	10–4 (5–0)	Dahlberg Arena (2,924); Missoula, MT
Jan 14, 2019; 7:00 pm		Montana State	L 66–79	10–5 (5–1)	Bank of Colorado Arena (979); Greeley, CO
Jan 17, 2019; 12:00 pm		Weber State	L 54–55	10–6 (5–2)	Bank of Colorado Arena (2,765); Greeley, CO
Jan 19, 2019; 7:00 pm		Idaho State	W 60–56	11–6 (6–2)	Bank of Colorado Arena (1,237); Greeley, CO
Jan 24, 2019; 6:30 pm		at Southern Utah	W 71–44	12–6 (7–2)	America First Events Center (647); Cedar City, UT
Jan 26, 2019; 2:00 pm		Northern Arizona	W 63–53	13–6 (8–2)	Bank of Colorado Arena (1,339); Greeley, CO
Feb 4, 2019; 6:00 pm		at Montana State	W 84–73	14–6 (9–2)	Shroyer Gymnasium (1,142); Bozeman, MT
Feb 9, 2019; 3:00 pm		at Portland State	L 66–85	14–7 (9–3)	Viking Pavilion (427); Portland, OR
Feb 11, 2019; 6:00 pm		at Sacramento State	W 71–61	15–7 (10–3)	Hornets Nest (246); Sacramento, CA
Feb 14, 2019; 7:00 pm		Eastern Washington	L 72–76	15–8 (10–4)	Bank of Colorado Arena (968); Greeley, CO
Feb 16, 2019; 2:00 pm		Idaho	W 77–72	16–8 (11–4)	Bank of Colorado Arena (1,547); Greeley, CO
Feb 25, 2019; 7:00 pm		Montana	W 79–61	17–8 (12–4)	Bank of Colorado Arena (1,274); Greeley, CO
Feb 28, 2019; 7:00 pm		at Idaho State	W 61–59	18–8 (13–4)	Reed Gym (1,128); Pocatello, ID
Mar 2, 2019; 12:00 pm		at Weber State	W 71–61	19–8 (14–4)	Dee Events Center (622); Ogden, UT
Mar 7, 2019; 7:00 pm		Southern Utah	W 88–71	20–8 (15–4)	Bank of Colorado Arena (1,328); Greeley, CO
Mar 9, 2019; 2:00 pm		at Northern Arizona	L 68–79	20–9 (15–5)	Walkup Skydome (461); Flagstaff, AZ
Big Sky Women's Tournament
Mar 12, 2019; 5:30 pm	(2)	vs. (10) Southern Utah; Quarterfinals	W 82–50	21–9	CenturyLink Arena; Boise, ID
Mar 13, 2019; 8:30 pm, ELVN	(2)	vs. (6) Eastern Washington; Semifinals	L 57–59	21–10	CenturyLink Arena; Boise, ID
WNIT
Mar 21, 2019*; 6:30 pm		at Wyoming; First Round	L 60–68	21–11	Arena-Auditorium (2,685); Laramie, WY
*Non-conference game. ^{#}Rankings from AP Poll. (#) Tournament seedings in parentheses. All times are in Mountain Time.

== Rankings ==
2018–19 NCAA Division I women's basketball rankings

Regular season polls
Poll	Pre- Season	Week 2	Week 3	Week 4	Week 5	Week 6	Week 7	Week 8	Week 9	Week 10	Week 11	Week 12	Week 13	Week 14	Week 15	Week 16	Week 17	Week 18	Week 19	Final
AP																				N/A
Coaches		N/A																		

Legend
	Increase in ranking
	Decrease in ranking
	No change
(RV)	Received votes
(NR)	Not ranked

== See also ==
- 2018–19 Northern Colorado Bears men's basketball team
