= 2018–19 Montana Lady Griz basketball team =

Intercollegiate basketball season

2018–19 Montana Lady Griz basketball

Lady Griz Classic Champions
- Conference: Big Sky Conference
- Record: 14–16 (9–11 Big Sky)
- Head coach: Shannon Schweyen (3rd season)
- Assistant coaches: Sonya Stokken; Mike Petrino; Jordan Sullivan
- Home arena: Dahlberg Arena

2018–19 Big Sky women's basketball standings
	Conf.				Overall
Team	W		L	PCT	W		L	PCT
Idaho	16	–	4	.800	22	–	12	.647
Northern Colorado	15	–	5	.750	21	–	11	.656
Idaho State	15	–	5	.750	20	–	11	.645
Portland State †	14	–	6	.700	25	–	8	.758
Montana State	11	–	9	.550	16	–	15	.516
Eastern Washington	9	–	11	.450	13	–	20	.394
Montana	9	–	11	.450	14	–	16	.467
Northern Arizona	8	–	12	.400	13	–	18	.419
Sacramento State	6	–	14	.300	10	–	19	.345
Southern Utah	4	–	16	.200	8	–	23	.258
Weber State	3	–	17	.150	6	–	25	.194
† 2019 Big Sky tournament winner Rankings from AP poll

The 2018–19 Montana Lady Griz basketball team represented the University of Montana during the 2018–19 NCAA Division I women's basketball season. The Lady Griz were led by third year head coach Shannon Schweyen, played their home games at Dahlberg Arena and were members of the Big Sky Conference. They finished the season 14–16, 9–9 in Big Sky play to finish in a tie for sixth place. They lost in the first round of the Big Sky women's tournament to Southern Utah.

== Roster ==
2018–19 Montana Lady Griz women's basketball team
Players
Coaches

Pos.	#	Name	Height	Year	Previous school	Hometown
G	1	Katie Mayhue	5 ft 10 in (1.78 m)	Fr	South Albany HS	Albany, OR
G	2	Sophia Stiles	5 ft 9 in (1.75 m)	So	Malta HS	Malta, MT
G	3	Gabi Harrington	5 ft 9 in (1.75 m)	RS So	Bishop Kelly HS	Boise, ID
G	5	Sammy Fatkin (redshirt)	5 ft 11 in (1.8 m)	So	Glacier Peak HS; Arizona	Snohomish, WA
F	11	Abby Anderson	6 ft 2 in (1.88 m)	RS Fr	Glencoe HS	Hillsboro, OR
G	12	Lee Camel (W)	5 ft 9 in (1.75 m)	So	Ronan HS	Ronan, MT
F	13	Kylie Frohlich	6 ft 0 in (1.83 m)	Fr	Sentinel HS	Missoula, MT
F	20	Carmen Gfeller	6 ft 1 in (1.85 m)	Fr	Colfax HS	Colfax, WA
G	22	Jordyn Schweyen	5 ft 11 in (1.8 m)	Fr	Sentinel HS	Missoula, MT
G	23	Taylor Goligoski	5 ft 8 in (1.73 m)	RS Jr	Hamilton HS	Hamilton, MT
F	24	Jace Henderson	6 ft 0 in (1.83 m)	RS Sr	Billings Senior HS	Billings, MT
G	32	McKenzie Johnston	5 ft 7 in (1.7 m)	RS Jr	Capital HS	Helena, MT
G	34	Madi Schoening	5 ft 9 in (1.75 m)	Jr	Sandpoint HS	Sandpoint, ID
F	44	Emma Stockholm	6 ft 2 in (1.88 m)	Jr	Chelan HS	Chelan, WA

Head coach

- Shannon Schweyen (Montana)

Assistant coach(es)

- Mike Petrino (Montana State Billings)
- Sonya Stokken (Montana)
- Jordan Sullivan (Montana)

Legend

- (C) Team captain
- (S) Suspended
- (I) Ineligible
- (W) Walk-on
- Injured
- Current redshirt

Roster

== Schedule ==
Date time, TV	Rank^{#}	Opponent^{#}	Result	Record	Site (attendance) city, state
Exhibition
Oct 30, 2018*; 7:00 pm		Carroll (MT)	W 71–56		Dahlberg Arena (2,382); Missoula, MT
Dec 20, 2018*; 7:00 pm		Montana Tech	W 81–49		Dahlberg Arena; Missoula, MT
Non-conference regular season
Nov 7, 2018*; 7:00 pm		at Gonzaga	L 52–76	0–1	McCarthey Athletic Center (5,472); Spokane, WA
Nov 20, 2018*; 11:30 am		Providence (MT)	W 90–45	1–1	Dalhberg Arena (6,610); Missoula, MT
Nov 24, 2018*; 7:00 pm		South Dakota	L 41–64	1–2	Dalhberg Arena (2,682); Missoula, MT
Dec 1, 2018*; 2:00 pm		Northern Illinois; 38th Lady Griz Classic semifinals	W 86–70	2–2	Dalhberg Arena (2,816); Missoula, MT
Dec 2, 2018*; 2:00 pm		UC Davis; 38th Lady Griz Classic championship	W 62–56	3–2	Dalhberg Arena (2,443); Missoula, MT
Dec 5, 2018*; 11:00 am		at Arizona	L 51–100	3–3	McKale Center (4,703); Tucson, AZ
Dec 7, 2018*; 6:00 pm		at Grand Canyon	W 69–47	4–3	GCU Arena (1,287); Phoenix, AZ
Dec 15, 2018*; 2:00 pm		at Washington; Husky Classic semifinals	L 54–69	4–4	Alaska Airlines Arena (1,600); Seattle, WA
Dec 16, 2018*; 2:00 pm		vs. Saint Francis (PA); Husky Classic 3rd place game	W 79–77	5–4	Alaska Airlines Arena (311); Seattle, WA
Big Sky regular season
Dec 29, 2018; 2:00 pm		Northern Arizona	W 78–62	6–4 (1–0)	Dalhberg Arena (3,031); Missoula, MT
Dec 31, 2018; 2:00 pm		Southern Utah	W 79–57	7–4 (2–0)	Dalhberg Arena (2,930); Missoula, MT
Jan 3, 2019; 8:00 pm		at Sacramento State	W 88–86 ^{2OT}	8–4 (3–0)	Hornets Nest (206); Sacramento, CA
Jan 5, 2019; 3:00 pm		at Portland State	L 60–78	8–5 (3–1)	Viking Pavilion (601); Portland, OR
Jan 10, 2019; 7:00 pm		Eastern Washington	L 62–68	8–6 (3–2)	Dahlberg Arena (2,636); Missoula, MT
Jan 12, 2019; 2:00 pm		Northern Colorado	L 62–73	8–7 (3–3)	Dahlberg Arena (2,924); Missoula, MT
Jan 19, 2019; 2:00 pm		Idaho	W 82–79	9–7 (4–3)	Dahlberg Arena (2,795); Missoula, MT
Jan 24, 2019; 7:00 pm		at Idaho State	L 34–50	9–8 (4–4)	Reed Gym (981); Pocatello, ID
Jan 26, 2019; 2:00 pm		at Weber State	W 72–60	10–8 (5–4)	Dee Events Center (609); Ogden, UT
Feb 2, 2019; 2:00 pm, SWX MT		at Montana State	L 52–74	10–9 (5–5)	Brick Breeden Fieldhouse (3,017); Bozeman, MT
Feb 7, 2019; 7:00 pm		at Idaho	L 68–72	10–10 (5–6)	Cowan Spectrum (613); Moscow, ID
Feb 9, 2019; 3:00 pm		at Eastern Washington	L 64–67	10–11 (5–7)	Reese Court (389); Cheney, WA
Feb 14, 2019; 7:00 pm		Weber State	W 64–56	11–11 (6–7)	Dahlberg Arena (3,215); Missoula, MT
Feb 16, 2019; 2:00 pm		Idaho State	W 60–59	12–11 (7–7)	Dahlberg Arena (2,730); Missoula, MT
Feb 23, 2019; 2:00 pm, SWX MT		Montana State	L 71–75	12–12 (7–8)	Dahlberg Arena (3,847); Missoula, MT
Feb 25, 2019; 7:00 pm		at Northern Colorado	L 61–79	12–13 (7–9)	Bank of Colorado Arena (1,274); Greeley, CO
Mar 2, 2019; 2:00 pm		at Southern Utah	L 56–71	12–14 (7–10)	America First Events Center (621); Cedar City, UT
Mar 4, 2019; 6:30 pm		at Northern Arizona	L 65–82	12–15 (7–11)	Walkup Skydome (450); Flagstaff, AZ
Mar 7, 2019; 7:00 pm		Portland State	W 73–70 ^{OT}	13–15 (8–11)	Dalhberg Arena (2,837); Missoula, MT
Mar 9, 2019; 2:00 pm		Sacramento State	W 75–67	14–15 (9–11)	Dalhberg Arena (3,024); Missoula, MT
Big Sky Women's Tournament
Mar 11, 2019; 5:30 pm	(7)	vs. (10) Southern Utah; First Round	L 56–64	14–16	CenturyLink Arena; Boise, ID
*Non-conference game. ^{#}Rankings from AP Poll. (#) Tournament seedings in parentheses. All times are in Mountain Time.

== See also ==
- 2018–19 Montana Grizzlies basketball team
