= 2018–19 Montana State Bobcats women's basketball team =

Intercollegiate basketball season

2018–19 Montana State Bobcats women's basketball
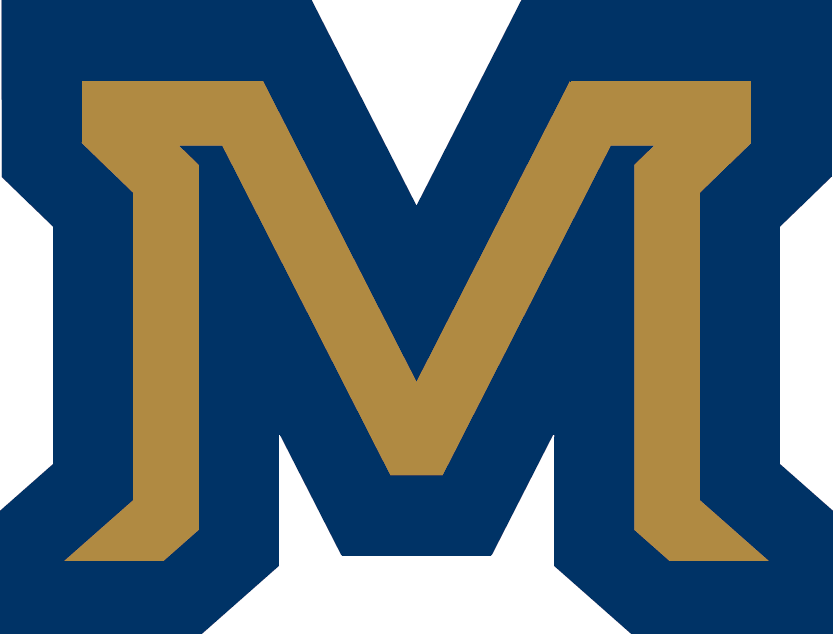
- Conference: Big Sky Conference
- Record: 16–15 (11–9 Big Sky)
- Head coach: Tricia Binford (13th season)
- Assistant coaches: Sunny Smallwood; Kati Burrows Mobley; Julian Assibey
- Home arena: Brick Breeden Fieldhouse

2018–19 Big Sky women's basketball standings
	Conf.				Overall
Team	W		L	PCT	W		L	PCT
Idaho	16	–	4	.800	22	–	12	.647
Northern Colorado	15	–	5	.750	21	–	11	.656
Idaho State	15	–	5	.750	20	–	11	.645
Portland State †	14	–	6	.700	25	–	8	.758
Montana State	11	–	9	.550	16	–	15	.516
Eastern Washington	9	–	11	.450	13	–	20	.394
Montana	9	–	11	.450	14	–	16	.467
Northern Arizona	8	–	12	.400	13	–	18	.419
Sacramento State	6	–	14	.300	10	–	19	.345
Southern Utah	4	–	16	.200	8	–	23	.258
Weber State	3	–	17	.150	6	–	25	.194
† 2019 Big Sky tournament winner Rankings from AP poll

The 2018–19 Montana State Bobcats women's basketball team represented Montana State University during the 2018–19 NCAA Division I women's basketball season. The Bobcats, led by thirteenth year head coach Tricia Binford, played their home games at Brick Breeden Fieldhouse and were members of the Big Sky Conference. They finished the season 16–15, 11–9 in Big Sky play to finish in fifth place. They lost in the quarterfinals of the Big Sky women's tournament to Portland State.

== Roster ==
2018–19 Montana State Bobcats women's basketball team
Players
Coaches

Pos.	#	Name	Height	Year	Previous school	Hometown
G	3	Ashley Van Sickle	5 ft 7 in (1.7 m)	So	Ralston Valley	Arvada, CO
G	11	Madisyn Shaide	5 ft 7 in (1.7 m)	RS Jr	Big Sky	Missoula, MT
G	12	Tori Martell	5 ft 8 in (1.73 m)	So	Somerset	Somerset, WI
F	14	Claire Lundberg	6 ft 1 in (1.85 m)	RS Sr	Anoka; Seton Hall	Andover, MN
F	15	Martha Kuderer	5 ft 11 in (1.8 m)	RS Jr	Chanhassen; Seton Hall	Eden Prairie, MN
G	22	Kamden Hilborn	5 ft 7 in (1.7 m)	Fr	Helena	Montana City, MT
F	23	Gabby Mocchi	6 ft 1 in (1.85 m)	Fr	Champlin Park	Champlin, MN
G	24	Oliana Squires	5 ft 8 in (1.73 m)	Jr	Sand Creek	Colorado Springs, CO
G	25	Sidney Zieske	5 ft 8 in (1.73 m)	Fr	Waconia	Waconia, MN
G	32	Brynley Fitzgerald	5 ft 11 in (1.8 m)	Fr	Beaverhead County	Dillon, MT
F	33	Madeline Smith	6 ft 1 in (1.85 m)	Jr	Snohomish	Snohomish, WA
F	35	Fallyn Freije (redshirt)	6 ft 0 in (1.83 m)	Sr	Lakota-Edmore; North Dakota	Edmore, ND
F	42	Halle Wright	6 ft 0 in (1.83 m)	Fr	Cascade	Aumsville, OR
F	44	Blaire Braxton	6 ft 2 in (1.88 m)	Jr	Highlands Ranch	Highlands Ranch, CO

Head coach

- Tricia Binford (Boise State)

Assistant coach(es)

- Sunny Smallwood (Boise State)
- Kati Mobley (Montana State)
- Julian Assibey (William Penn)

Legend

- (C) Team captain
- (S) Suspended
- (I) Ineligible
- (W) Walk-on
- Injured
- Current redshirt

Roster

== Schedule ==
Date time, TV	Rank^{#}	Opponent^{#}	Result	Record	Site (attendance) city, state
Exhibition
Oct 30, 2018*; 6:00 pm		Montana Western	W 79–60		Brick Breeden Fieldhouse (1,228); Bozeman, MT
Non-conference regular season
Nov 6, 2018*; 11:00 am		Carroll (MT)	W 64–48	1–0	Brick Breeden Fieldhouse (6,772); Bozeman, MT
Nov 9, 2018*; 6:00 pm		at Marquette; Preseason WNIT First Round	L 52–100	1–1	Al McGuire Center (1,202); Milwaukee, WI
Nov 16, 2018*; 3:00 pm		vs. Delaware; Preseason WNIT consolation round	W 69–60	2–1	Strahan Coliseum (150); San Marcos, TX
Nov 17, 2018*; 5:30 pm		at Texas State; Preseason WNIT consolation round	W 67–59	3–1	Strahan Coliseum (532); San Marcos, TX
Nov 27, 2018*; 6:30 pm		at Wyoming	L 58–66	3–2	Arena-Auditorium (2,381); Laramie, WY
Nov 30, 2018*; 7:00 pm, SWX MT		Long Beach State	W 85–62	4–2	Brick Breeden Fieldhouse (1,498); Bozeman, MT
Nov 30, 2018*; 7:00 pm, ESPN+		at Stephen F. Austin	L 53–60	4–3	William R. Johnson Coliseum (2,198); Nacogdoches, TX
Dec 8, 2018*; 12:00 pm		at TCU	L 49–71	4–4	Schollmaier Arena (1,879); For Worth, TX
Dec 16, 2018*; 2:00 pm		Omaha	W 59–56	5–4	Brick Breeden Fieldhouse (1,489); Bozeman, MT
Dec 18, 2018*; 7:00 pm		South Dakota State	L 67–68	5–5	Brick Breeden Fieldhouse (1,327); Bozeman, MT
Big Sky regular season
Dec 29, 2018; 2:00 pm		Southern Utah	W 69–64	6–5 (1–0)	Brick Breeden Fieldhouse (1,616); Bozeman, MT
Dec 31, 2018; 4:00 pm		Northern Arizona	W 80–70	7–5 (2–0)	Brick Breeden Fieldhouse (1,359); Bozeman, MT
Jan 3, 2019; 8:00 pm		at Portland State	L 53–55	7–6 (2–1)	Viking Pavilion (527); Portland, OR
Jan 5, 2019; 3:00 pm		at Sacramento State	W 69–53	8–6 (3–1)	Hornets Nest (332); Sacramento, CA
Jan 10, 2019; 7:00 pm		Idaho	L 66–82	8–7 (3–2)	Brick Breeden Fieldhouse (1,558); Bozeman, MT
Jan 14, 2019; 7:00 pm		at Northern Colorado	W 79–66	9–7 (4–2)	Bank of Colorado Arena (979); Greeley, CO
Jan 19, 2019; 2:00 pm		Eastern Washington	L 87–89 ^{OT}	9–8 (4–3)	Brick Breeden Fieldhouse (2,147); Bozeman, MT
Jan 24, 2019; 7:00 pm		at Weber State	W 66–59	10–8 (5–3)	Dee Events Center (467); Ogden, UT
Jan 26, 2019; 7:00 pm		at Idaho State	L 43–61	10–9 (5–4)	Reed Gym (1,092); Pocatello, ID
Feb 2, 2019; 2:00 pm, SWX MT		Montana	W 74–52	11–9 (6–4)	Brick Breeden Fieldhouse (3,017); Bozeman, MT
Feb 4, 2019; 6:00 pm		Northern Colorado	L 73–84	11–10 (6–5)	Shroyer Gymnasium (1,142); Bozeman, MT
Feb 7, 2019; 7:00 pm		at Eastern Washington	W 61–47	12–10 (7–5)	Reese Court (322); Cheney, WA
Feb 9, 2019; 3:00 pm		at Idaho	L 65–90	12–11 (7–6)	Cowan Spectrum (500); Moscow, ID
Feb 14, 2019; 7:00 pm		Idaho State	L 49–62	12–12 (7–7)	Brick Breeden Fieldhouse (1,176); Bozeman, MT
Feb 16, 2019; 2:00 pm		Weber State	W 72–59	13–12 (8–7)	Brick Breeden Fieldhouse (2,017); Bozeman, MT
Feb 23, 2019; 2:00 pm, SWX MT		at Montana	W 75–71	14–12 (9–7)	Dahlberg Arena (3,847); Missoula, MT
Mar 2, 2019; 2:00 pm		at Northern Arizona	L 72–76	14–13 (9–8)	Walkup Skydome (370); Flagstaff, AZ
Mar 4, 2019; 6:30 pm		at Southern Utah	W 70–55	15–13 (10–8)	America First Events Center (753); Cedar City, UT
Mar 7, 2019; 7:00 pm		Sacramento State	W 64–58	16–13 (11–8)	Brick Breeden Fieldhouse (1,418); Bozeman, MT
Mar 9, 2019; 2:00 pm		Portland State	L 55–68	16–14 (11–9)	Brick Breeden Fieldhouse (1,708); Bozeman, MT
Big Sky Women's Tournament
Mar 12, 2019; 2:30 pm	(5)	vs. (4) Portland State; Quarterfinals	L 56–68	16–15	CenturyLink Arena; Boise, ID
*Non-conference game. ^{#}Rankings from AP Poll. (#) Tournament seedings in parentheses. All times are in Mountain Time.

== See also ==
2018–19 Montana State Bobcats men's basketball team
