= 2019 Big Sky Conference women's basketball tournament =

Postseason tournament at CenturyLink Arena in Boise, Idaho

- Classification: Division I
- Season: 2018–19
- Teams: 11
- Site: CenturyLink Arena; Boise, ID
- Champions: Portland State (2nd title)
- Winning coach: Lynn Kennedy (1st title)
- MVP: Ashley Bolston (Portland State)
- Television: Pluto TV, ELEVEN

2018–19 Big Sky women's basketball standings
	Conf.				Overall
Team	W		L	PCT	W		L	PCT
Idaho	16	–	4	.800	22	–	12	.647
Northern Colorado	15	–	5	.750	21	–	11	.656
Idaho State	15	–	5	.750	20	–	11	.645
Portland State †	14	–	6	.700	25	–	8	.758
Montana State	11	–	9	.550	16	–	15	.516
Eastern Washington	9	–	11	.450	13	–	20	.394
Montana	9	–	11	.450	14	–	16	.467
Northern Arizona	8	–	12	.400	13	–	18	.419
Sacramento State	6	–	14	.300	10	–	19	.345
Southern Utah	4	–	16	.200	8	–	23	.258
Weber State	3	–	17	.150	6	–	25	.194
† 2019 Big Sky tournament winner Rankings from AP poll

The 2019 Big Sky Conference women's basketball tournament was a postseason tournament that was held from March 11–15, 2019 at CenturyLink Arena in Boise, Idaho. Portland State, the winner of the Big Sky tournament, earned an automatic bid to the 2019 NCAA tournament.

== Seeds ==
Big Sky tiebreaker procedures are as follows:

1. Head-to-head
2. Performance against conference teams in descending order to finish
3. Higher RPI
4. Coin Flip

Seed	School	Conference	Overall*	Tiebreaker
1	Idaho	16–4	19–10	
2	Northern Colorado	15–5	20–9	2–0 vs. ISU
3	Idaho State	15–5	20–9	0–2 vs. UNC
4	Portland State	14–6	22–7	
5	Montana State	11–9	16–14	
6	Eastern Washington	9–11	10–19	2–0 vs. UM
7	Montana	9–11	14–15	0–2 vs. EWU
8	Northern Arizona	8–12	12–17	
9	Sacramento State	6–14	10–18	
10	Southern Utah	4–16	7–22	
11	Weber State	3–17	6–24	

* Overall record at end of regular season.

== Schedule ==
Session	Game	Time*	Matchup^{#}	Television	Attendance
First Round – Monday, March 11
1	1	2:30 PM	#8 Northern Arizona vs. #9 Sacramento State	Pluto TV	
1	2	5:30 PM	#7 Montana vs. #10 Southern Utah	Pluto TV	
1	3	8:00 PM	#6 Eastern Washington vs. #11 Weber State	Pluto TV	
Quarterfinals – Tuesday, March 12
2	4	12:00 PM	#1 Idaho vs. #8 Northern Arizona	Pluto TV	
2	5	2:30 PM	#4 Portland State vs. #5 Montana State	Pluto TV	
3	6	5:30 PM	#2 Northern Colorado vs. #10 Southern Utah	Pluto TV	
3	7	8:00 PM	#3 Idaho State vs. #6 Eastern Washington	Pluto TV	
Semifinals – Wednesday, March 13
4	8	5:30 PM	#1 Idaho vs. #4 Portland State	ELEVEN	
4	9	8:00 PM	#2 Northern Colorado vs. #6 Eastern Washington	ELEVEN	
Championship Game – Friday, March 15
5	10	1:00 PM	#4 Portland State vs. #6 Eastern Washington	ELEVEN	
*Game Times in MT.

== Bracket ==
First round Monday, March 11; Pluto TV 231
8	Northern Arizona	74
9	Sacramento State	69
7	Montana	56
10	Southern Utah	64
6	Eastern Washington	81
11	Weber State	74

Quarterfinals; Tuesday, March 12; Pluto TV 231
1	Idaho	90
8	Northern Arizona	73
4	Portland State	68
5	Montana State	56
2	Northern Colorado	82
10	Southern Utah	50
3	Idaho State	65
6	Eastern Washington	67*

Semifinals; Wednesday, March 13; ELEVEN
1	Idaho	59
4	Portland State	75
2	Northern Colorado	57
6	Eastern Washington	59

Championship; Friday, March 15; ELEVEN
4	Portland State	61
6	Eastern Washington	59

* denotes overtime period

== See also ==
- 2019 Big Sky Conference men's basketball tournament
