= Rainier Junior/Senior High School =

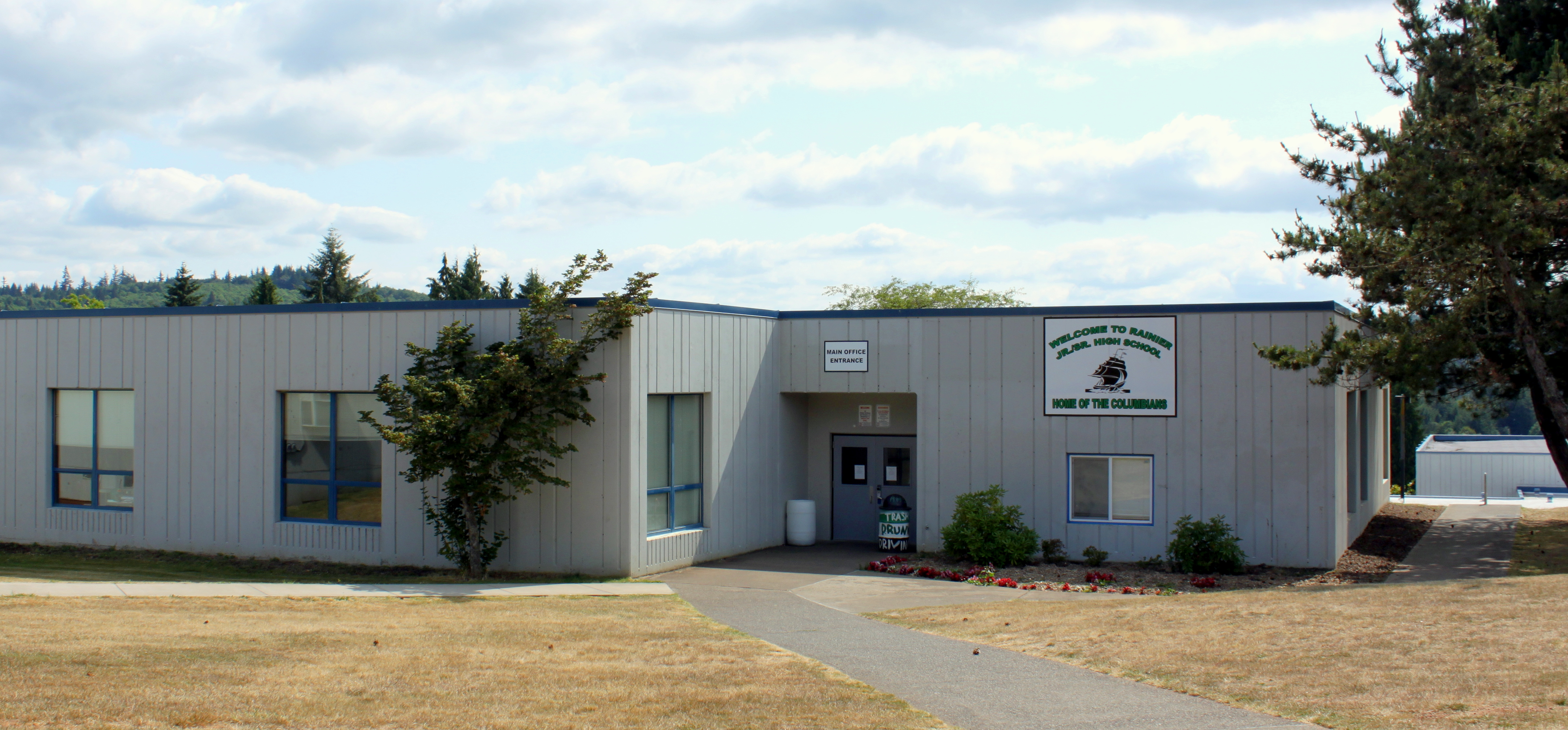

Location
- 28170 Old Rainier Road; Rainier, Columbia County, Oregon 97048; United States; 46.091697°N 122.989036°W

Information
- Type: Public
- School district: Rainier School District
- Principal: Russell D. Pickett
- Staff: 27.41 (FTE)
- Grades: 7-12
- Enrollment: 379 (2023-2024)
- Student to teacher ratio: 13.83
- Colors: Green, black, and white
- Athletics conference: OSAA Lewis & Clark League 3A-1
- Mascot: Columbian
- Website: Rainier HS website

Rainier Junior/Senior High School is a public school in Rainier, Oregon, United States that serves middle- and high school-aged students.
