= America First Event Center =

Arena in Cedar City, Utah

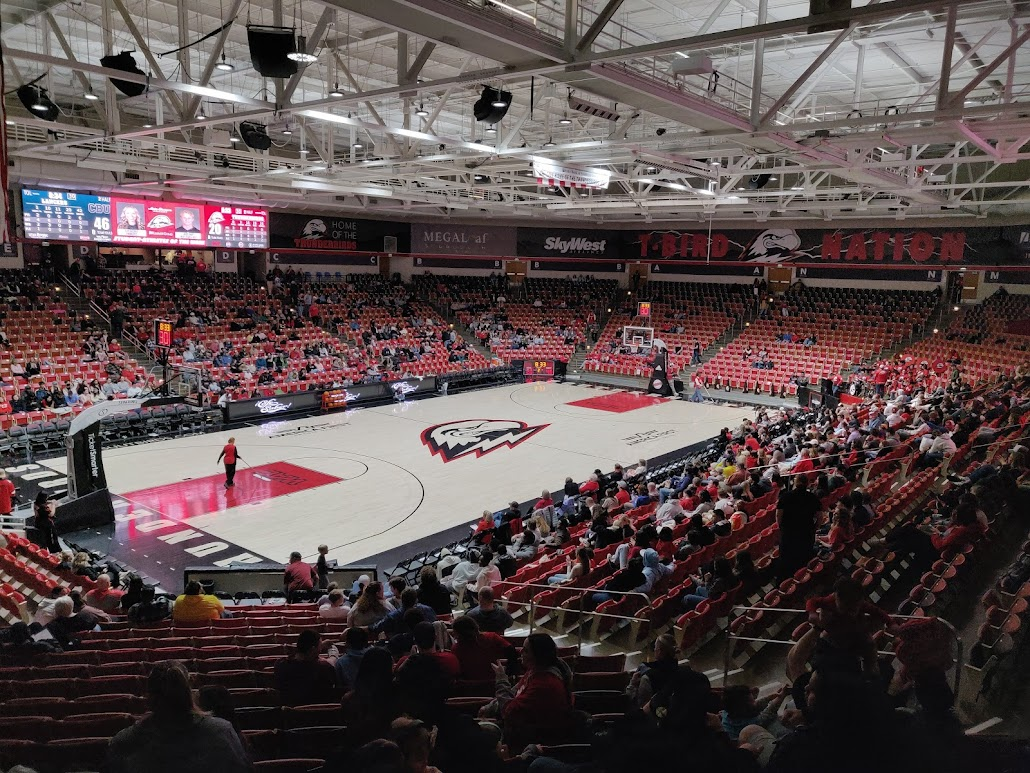
- Interactive map of America First Event Center
- Location: 351 University Boulevard; Cedar City, UT 84720
- Coordinates: 37°40′32″N 113°04′23″W
- Owner: Southern Utah University
- Operator: Southern Utah University
- Capacity: 5,300

Construction
- Opened: 1985

Tenants
- Southern Utah Thunderbirds (NCAA) (1985–present)

America First Event Center is a 5,300-seat multi-purpose arena in Cedar City, Utah. It was built in 1985. It is home to the Southern Utah University Thunderbirds basketball, volleyball and gymnastics teams. The America First Event Center is also the centerpiece venue for the Utah Summer Games. The arena was previously known as the Centrum Arena but was renamed in 2017 as part of a naming rights deal with America First Credit Union valued at $1.5 million over 10 years.

== Gallery ==
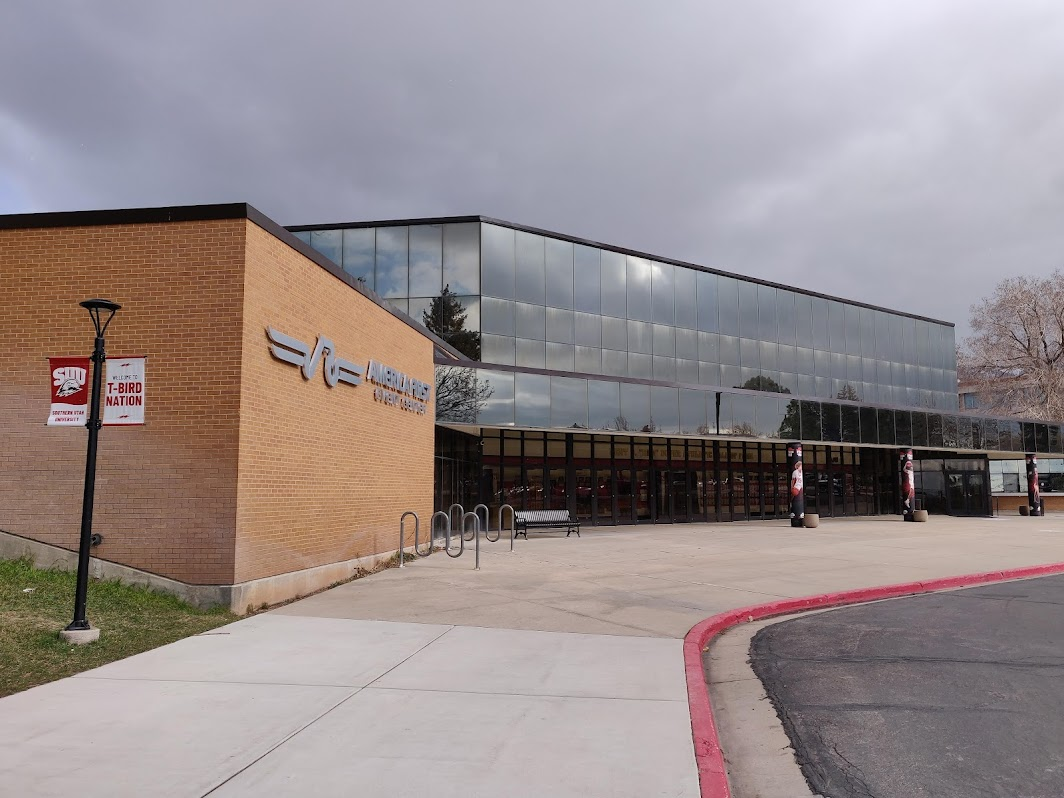
America First Event Center1

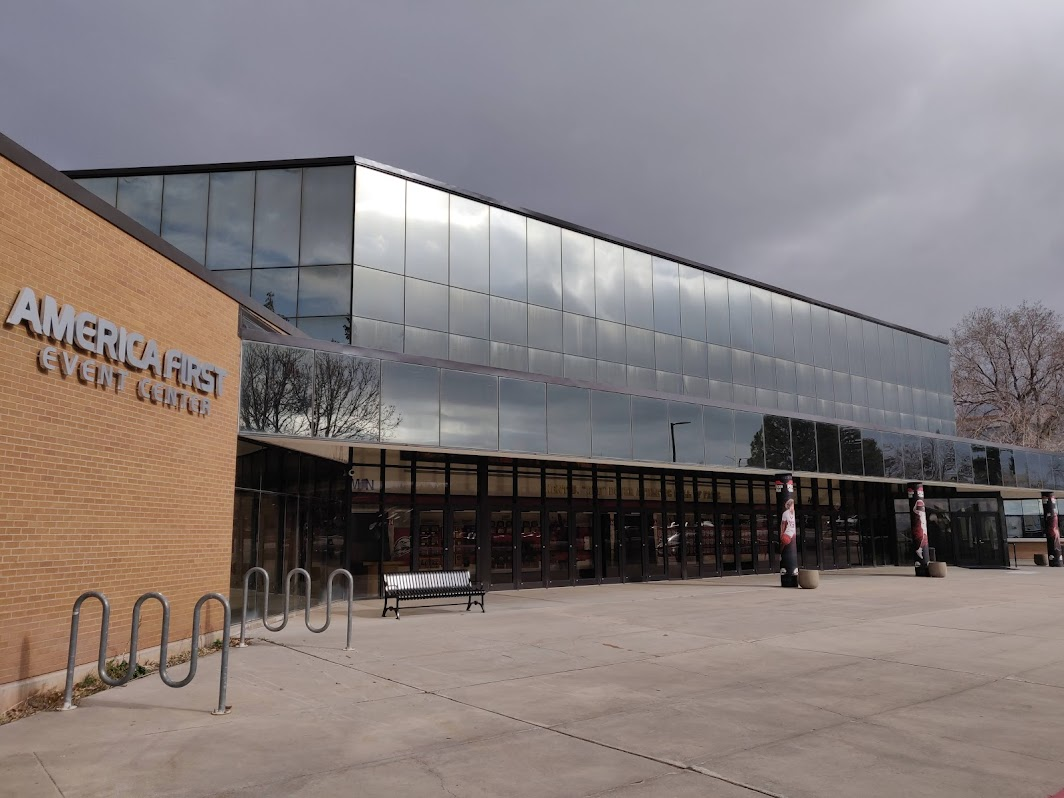
America First Event Center2

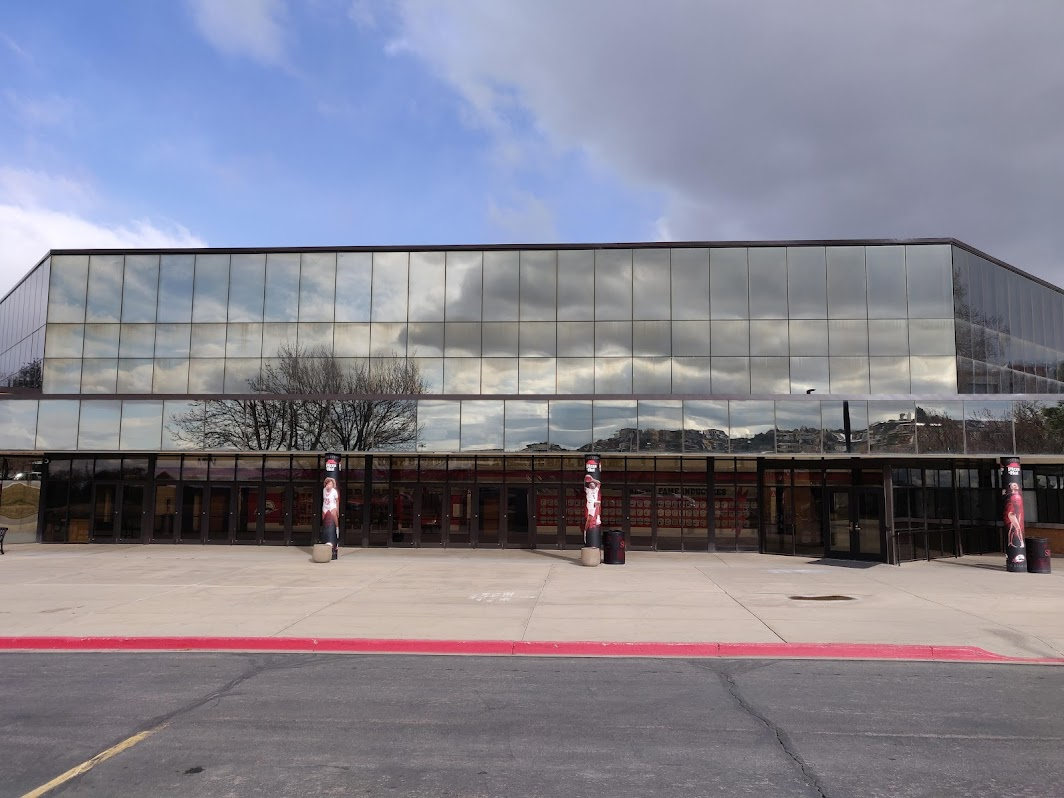
America First Event Center3

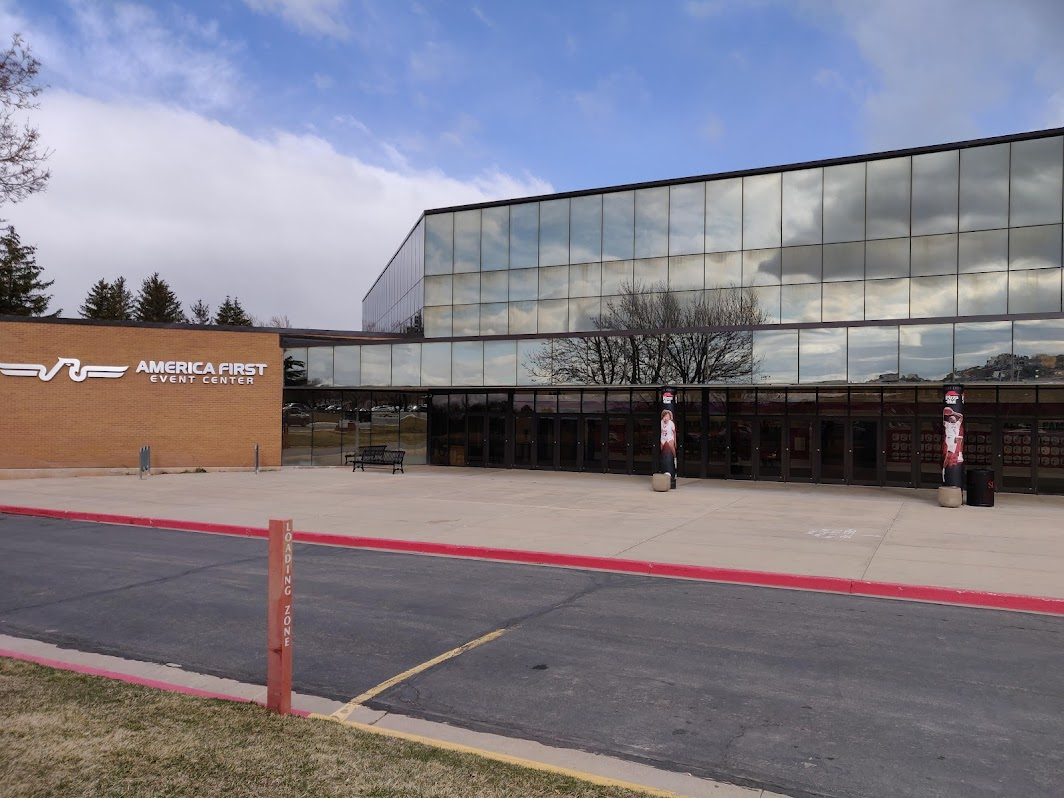
America First Event Center4

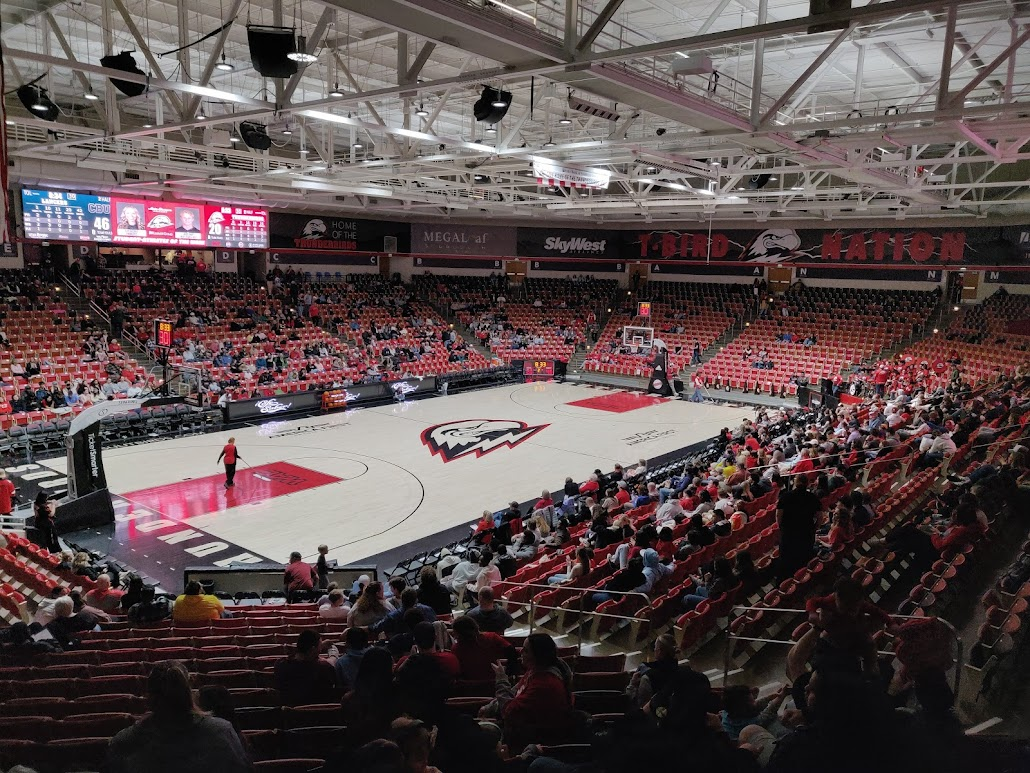
America First Event Center Inside1

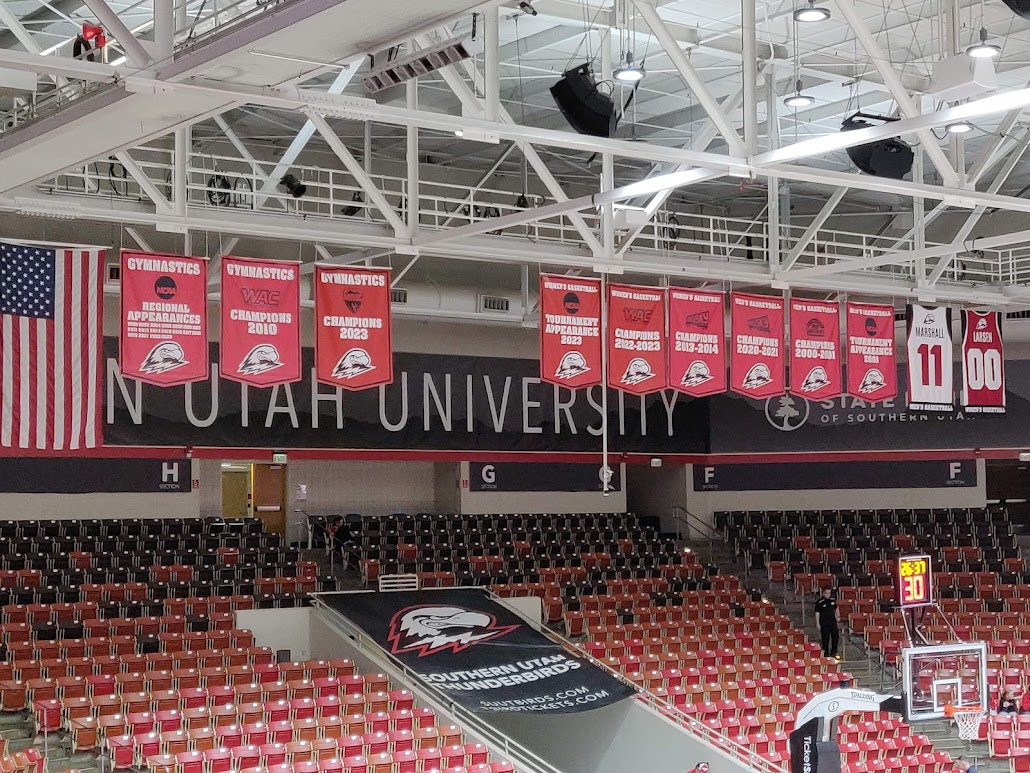
America First Event Center Inside2

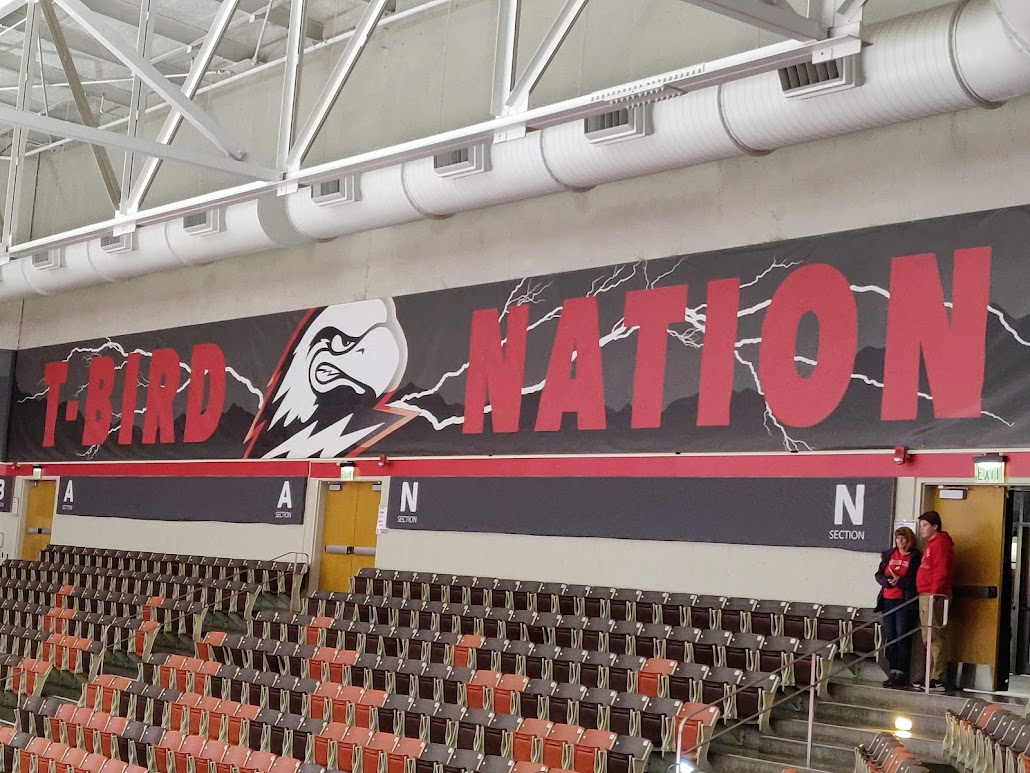
America First Event Center T-Bird Nation

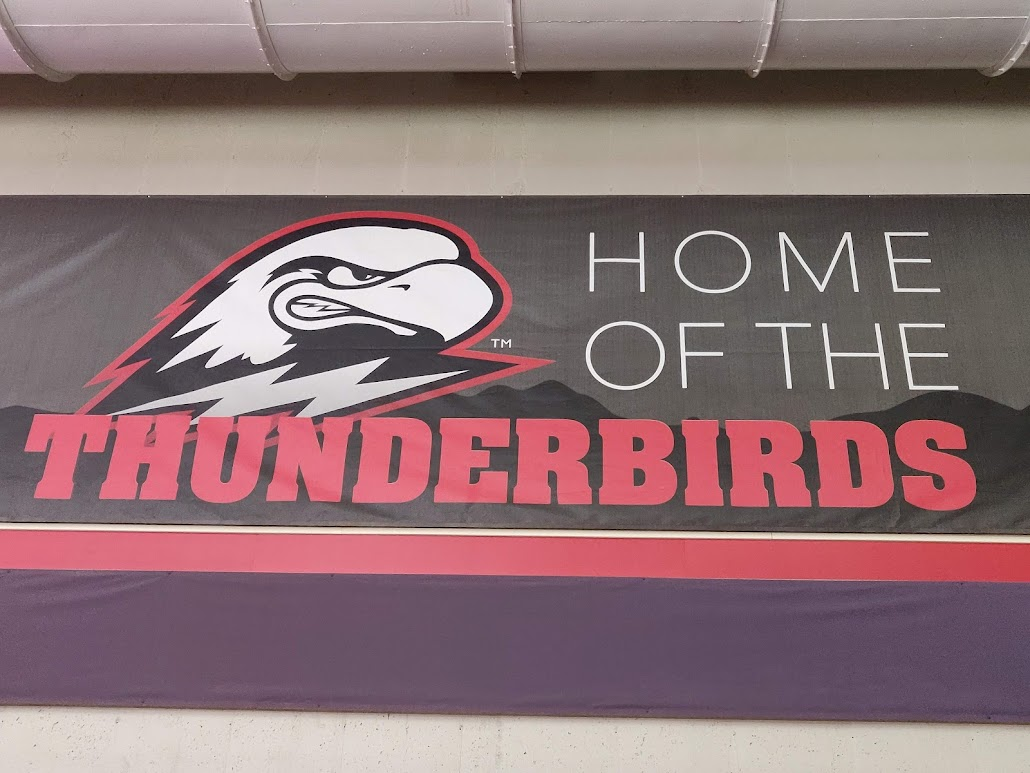
America First Event Center Thunderbirds

== See also ==
- List of NCAA Division I basketball arenas
- List of basketball arenas
- List of indoor arenas in the United States
