= 2018–19 BYU Cougars women's basketball team =

Intercollegiate basketball season

2018–19 BYU Cougars women's basketball

WCC Tournament Champions

NCAA Women's Tournament, second round
- Conference: West Coast Conference
- Record: 26–7 (15–3 WCC)
- Head coach: Jeff Judkins (18th season)
- Assistant coaches: Ray Stewart (8th season); Dan Nielson (6th season); Ashley Garfield (2nd season)
- Home arena: Marriott Center

2018–19 West Coast Conference women's basketball standings
	Conf.				Overall
Team	W		L	PCT	W		L	PCT
No. 16 Gonzaga	16	–	2	.889	29	–	5	.853
BYU †	15	–	3	.833	26	–	7	.788
Pepperdine	12	–	6	.667	22	–	12	.647
Saint Mary's	12	–	6	.667	21	–	12	.636
Pacific	10	–	8	.556	19	–	13	.594
Loyola Marymount	10	–	8	.556	18	–	15	.545
Santa Clara	6	–	12	.333	14	–	17	.452
Portland	5	–	13	.278	13	–	17	.433
San Diego	2	–	16	.111	9	–	21	.300
San Francisco	2	–	16	.111	7	–	24	.226
† 2019 WCC tournament winner As of March 23, 2019; Rankings from AP poll

The 2018–19 BYU Cougars women's basketball team represented Brigham Young University during the 2018–19 NCAA Division I women's basketball season. It was head coach Jeff Judkins's eighteenth season at BYU. The Cougars, members of the West Coast Conference, played their home games at the Marriott Center. In 2019, the Cougars won the West Coast Conference tournament championship game over Gonzaga. In that tournament, Paisley Johnson was named the tournament's Most Outstanding Player. They finished the season 26–7, 15–3 in WCC play to finish in second round. In the NCAA women's tournament as a 7th seed in the Chicago regional they defeated Auburn in the first round before losing to Stanford in the second round.

== Before the season ==
=== Departures ===
Name	Number	Pos.	Height	Year	Hometown	Notes
Amanda Wayment	4	F	6'1	Senior	Ogden, Utah	Graduated
Liz Eaton	11	G	5'10	Sophomore	Mapleton, Utah	Transferred to Weber State
Cassie Broadhead	20	G	5'8	Senior	Glenville, New York	Graduated
Hayley Rydalch	43	F	6'3"	RS Junior	St. George, Utah	Graduated; Transferred to UNLV
MaCayla Hanks Longson	50	C	6'4	Junior	Millville, Utah	

=== Newcomers ===
Name	Number	Pos.	Height	Year	Hometown	Notes
Shaylee Gonzales	2	G	5'10	Freshman	Gilbert, Arizona	
Kaylee Smiler	11	G	5'8	Freshman	Hamilton, New Zealand	
Caitlyn Alldredge	12	G	5'10"	Senior	Centerville, Utah	Joins after finishing her four years of softball; winter semester will be her final semester
Babalu Ugwu	14	F	6'0	Freshman	Judai, Sao Paulo, Brazil	

== 2018–19 media ==
=== BYU Sports Media ===
All Cougars home games are scheduled to be shown on BYUtv or on TheW.tv powered by Stadium. Conference road games will also be shown on TheW.tv. Most regular season road games will be streamed. Streaming partners for those games can be found on the schedule.

== Roster ==
2018–19 BYU Cougars women's basketball team
Players
Coaches

Pos.	#	Name	Height	Year	Previous school	Hometown
G	1	Brenna Chase	5 ft 9 in (1.75 m)	Jr	Broomfield	Thornton, CO
G	2	Shaylee Gonzales	5 ft 10 in (1.78 m)	Fr	Mesquite	Gilbert, AZ
F	3	Shalae Salmon	6 ft 3 in (1.91 m)	Jr	Wellington Girls' College	Porirua, New Zealand
G	5	Maria Albiero	5 ft 8 in (1.73 m)	So	Neusa Christian	Londrina, Brazil
G	10	Abby Mangum	6 ft 0 in (1.83 m)	RS Fr	Eagle	Eagle, ID
F	11	Kaylee Smiler	5 ft 8 in (1.73 m)	Fr	Melville	Hamilton, New Zealand
G	12	Caitlyn Alldredge	5 ft 10 in (1.78 m)	Sr	Eagle	Eagle, ID
G	13	Paisley Johnson	5 ft 9 in (1.75 m)	So	Glacier Peak	Everett, WA
F	14	Babalu Ugwu	6 ft 0 in (1.83 m)	Fr	Friendship Christian	Judai, Sao Paulo, Brazil
F	15	Malli Valgardson	6 ft 5 in (1.96 m)	RS Fr	Pleasant Grove	Pleasant Grove, UT
G	21	Khaedin Taito	5 ft 11 in (1.8 m)	RS Jr	Palm Beach Currumbin High School; USC	Hastings, New Zealand
C	22	Sara Hamson	6 ft 7 in (2.01 m)	So	Pleasant Grove	Lindon, UT
F	23	Tahlia White	6 ft 0 in (1.83 m)	Fr	Mountain View	Orem, UT
G	24	Ashley Beckstrand	5 ft 7 in (1.7 m)	RS Fr	Desert Hills	St. George, UT
F	32	Signe Glantz	6 ft 1 in (1.85 m)	Fr	Luleå Gymnasie Skola	Östersund, Sweden
F	33	Jasmine Moody	6 ft 2 in (1.88 m)	Sr	Radford	Honolulu, HI
F	43	Haley Rydalch	6 ft 3 in (1.91 m)	RS Jr	Desert Hills/Purdue	St. George, UT

Head coach

- Jeff Judkins (Utah)

Assistant coach(es)

- Ray Stewart (Utah Valley)
- Dan Nielson (BYU)
- Ashley Garfield (BYU)
- Kim Parker Beeston- Director of Operations (BYU)

Legend

- (C) Team captain
- (S) Suspended
- (I) Ineligible
- (W) Walk-on
- Injured
- Current redshirt

Roster

== Schedule ==
Date time, TV	Rank^{#}	Opponent^{#}	Result	Record	Site city, state
Exhibition
11/06/2018*; 6:30 pm, TheW.tv		Dixie State	W 83–56	–	Marriott Center; Provo, UT
Non-conference regular season
11/09/2018*; 5:00 pm, BYUtv		UC Riverside	W 72–70 ^{OT}	1–0	Marriott Center; Provo, UT
11/13/2018*; 4:00 pm, TheW.tv		No. 23 California	L 52–70	1–1	Marriott Center; Provo, UT
11/17/2018*; 1:00 pm, TheW.tv		Eastern Washington	W 80–65	2–1	Marriott Center; Provo, UT
11/20/2018*; 7:00 pm, MW Net		at Utah State	W 62–57 ^{OT}	3–1	Dee Glen Smith Spectrum; Logan, UT
11/23/2018*; 8:15 pm		vs. TCU; SDSU Thanksgiving Classic	W 61–58	4–1	Viejas Arena; San Diego, CA
11/24/2018*; 6:00 pm		vs. California Baptist; SDSU Thanksgiving Classic	W 76–69	5–1	Viejas Arena; San Diego, CA
11/27/2018*; 6:30 pm, Pluto TV		at Southern Utah	L 64–67	5–2	America First Events Center; Cedar City, UT
11/29/2018*; 11:00 am, UVUtv; WAC DN		at Utah Valley; UCCU Crosstown Clash	W 77–51	6–2	Lockhart Arena; Orem, UT
12/08/2018*; 7:00 pm, P12 MTN		at Utah; Deseret First Duel	L 67–78	6–3	Huntsman Center; Salt Lake City, UT
12/15/2018*; 2:00 pm, BYUtv		Colorado State	W 51–42	7–3	Marriott Center; Provo, UT
12/21/2018*; 12:00 pm, TheW.tv		Northern Colorado	W 70–50	8–3	Marriott Center; Provo, UT
WCC regular season
12/29/2018; 3:00 pm, TheW.tv		at Santa Clara	W 54–44	9–3 (1–0)	Leavey Center; Santa Clara, CA
12/31/2018; 4:00 pm, TheW.tv		at San Francisco	W 67–59	10–3 (2–0)	The Sobrato Center; San Francisco, CA
01/03/2019; 7:00 pm, BYUtv		Pepperdine	W 83–58	11–3 (3–0)	Marriott Center; Provo, UT
01/05/2019; 2:00 pm, BYUtv		Loyola Marymount	W 55–44	12–3 (4–0)	Marriott Center; Provo, UT
01/10/2019; 8:00 pm, TheW.tv		at Pacific	W 77–74	13–3 (5–0)	Alex G. Spanos Center; Stockton, CA
01/12/2019; 3:00 pm, TheW.tv		at Saint Mary's	W 74–73	14–3 (6–0)	McKeon Pavilion; Moraga, CA
01/17/2019; 7:00 pm, BYUtv		No. 13 Gonzaga	W 70–68	15–3 (7–0)	Marriott Center; Provo, UT
01/19/2019; 2:00 pm, BYUtv		Portland	W 79–71	16–3 (8–0)	Marriott Center; Provo, UT
01/26/2019; 3:00 pm, TheW.tv		at San Diego	W 65–56	17–3 (9–0)	Jenny Craig Pavilion; San Diego, CA
01/31/2019; 6:00 pm, TheW.tv	No. 25	at Loyola Marymount	L 58–61	17–4 (9–1)	Gersten Pavilion; Los Angeles, CA
02/02/2019; 3:00 pm, TheW.tv	No. 25	at Pepperdine	L 65–79	17–5 (9–2)	Firestone Fieldhouse; Malibu, CA
02/07/2019; 7:00 pm, BYUtv		Saint Mary's	L 75–78	17–6 (9–3)	Marriott Center; Provo, UT
02/09/2019; 2:00 pm, BYUtv		Pacific	W 75–49	18–6 (10–3)	Marriott Center; Provo, UT
02/14/2019; 8:00 pm, TheW.tv		at Portland	W 70–69	19–6 (11–3)	Chiles Center; Portland, OR
02/16/2019; 3:00 pm, SWX; TheW.tv		at No. 13 Gonzaga	W 66–64	20–6 (12–3)	McCarthey Athletic Center; Spokane, WA
02/23/2019; 2:00 pm, BYUtv		San Diego	W 80–68	21–6 (13–3)	Marriott Center; Provo, UT
02/28/2019; 7:00 pm, TheW.tv		San Francisco	W 82–59	22–6 (14–3)	Marriott Center; Provo, UT
03/02/2019; 2:00 pm, BYUtv		Santa Clara	W 69–64	23–6 (15–3)	Marriott Center; Provo, UT
WCC Tournament
03/11/2019; 3:00 pm, BYUtv	(2)	vs. (3) Pepperdine; Semifinals	W 68–63	24–6	Orleans Arena; Paradise, NV
03/12/2019; 2:00 pm, ESPNU	(2)	vs. (1) No. 12 Gonzaga; Championship Game	W 82–68	25–6	Orleans Arena; Paradise, NV
NCAA Women's Tournament
03/23/2019*; 1:30 pm, ESPN2	(7 C)	vs. (10 C) Auburn; First Round	W 73–64	26–6	Maples Pavilion; Stanford, CA
03/25/2019*; 9:00 pm, ESPN2	(7 C)	at (2 C) No. 6 Stanford; Second Round	L 63–72	26–7	Maples Pavilion; Stanford, CA
*Non-conference game. ^{#}Rankings from AP Poll / Coaches' Poll. (#) Tournament seedings in parentheses. C=Chicago Region. All times are in Mountain.

== Game summaries ==
=== Exhibition: Dixie State ===
Broadcasters: Robbie Bullough & Makenzi Pulsipher
Starting Lineups:

- Dixie State: London Pavlica, Mariah Martin, Lisa VanCampen, Keslee Stevenson, Maile Richardson
- BYU: Brenna Chase, Shalae Salmon, Maria Albiero, Paisley Johnson, Jasmine Moody

Nov 6	Dixie State Red Storm	56–83	BYU Cougars	Marriott Center Provo, UT
7:05 p.m. MDT	Scoring by quarter: 14–20, 15–22, 17–24, 10–17
TheW.tv	Pts: London Pavlica 13; Rebs: Lisa VanCampen 6 Asts: Keslee Stevenson 3	Recap	Pts: Brenna Chase 13; Rebs: Shalae Salmon 10; Asts: Brenna Chase 6	Attendance: N/A; Referees: InFini Robinson, Cheryll Blue, Steve Belnap

=== UC Riverside ===
Broadcasters: Jarom Jordan, Kristen Kozlowski, & Lauren McClain
Series History: BYU leads series 2–0
Starting Lineups:

- UC Riverside: Marina Ewodo, Tianna Eaton, Keilanei Cooper, Jannon Jaye Otto, Daphne Gnago
- BYU: Brenna Chase, Shalae Salmon, Maria Albiero, Paisley Johnson, Jasmine Moody

Nov 9	UC Riverside Highlanders	70–72(OT)	BYU Cougars	Marriott Center Provo, UT
5:05 p.m. MST	Scoring by quarter: 21–16, 12–21, 19–13, 14–16, Overtime: 4–6
BYUtv	Pts: Tianna Eaton 18; Rebs: Marina Ewodo, Jannon Otto 10; Asts: Jannon Otto 4	Recap	Pts: Brenna Chase, Paisley Johnson 18; Rebs: Paisley Johnson 12; Asts: Brenna Chase 7	Attendance: 1,575; Referees: Brenda Pantoja, Tyler Trimble, Esther Hsu

=== Cal ===
Broadcasters: Robbie Bullough & Makenzi Pulsipher
Series History: Cal leads series 4–0
Starting Lineups:

- Cal: Asha Thomas, Kianna Smith, Recee' Caldwell, Kristine Anigwe, Jaelyn Brown
- BYU: Brenna Chase, Shalae Salmon, Maria Albiero, Paisley Johnson, Jasmine Moody

Nov 13	#23 Cal Golden Bears	70–52	BYU Cougars	Marriott Center Provo, UT
4:00 p.m. MST	Scoring by quarter: 10–14, 14–11, 22–16, 24–11
TheW.tv	Pts: Asha Thomas 17; Rebs: Kristine Anigwe 12; Asts: Asha Thomas 6	Recap	Pts: Paisley Johnson 14; Rebs: Paisley Johnson 7 Asts: Brenna Chase 5	Attendance: 425; Referees: Melissa Barlow, Benny Luna, Julie Krommenhoek

=== Eastern Washington ===
Broadcasters: Robbie Bullough & Makenzi Pulsipher
Series History: BYU leads series 4–1
Starting Lineups:

- Eastern Washington: Uriah Howard, Jessica McDowell-White, Violet Kapri Morrow, Brittany Klaman, Alissa Sealby
- BYU: Brenna Chase, Shalae Salmon, Maria Albiero, Paisley Johnson, Jasmine Moody

Nov 17	Eastern Washington Eagles	65–80	BYU Cougars	Marriott Center Provo, UT
1:05 p.m. MST	Scoring by quarter: 12–20, 14–20, 17–18, 22–22
TheW.tv	Pts: Grace Kirscher 21; Rebs: Uriah Howard 8 Asts: Amira Chandler, Alissa Sealby 4	Recap	Pts: Brenna Chase 17; Rebs: Paisley Johnson 6 Asts: Brenna Chase 10	Attendance: 762; Referees: L Jones, T Jump, M Head

=== Utah State ===
Broadcasters: Jaden Johnson
Series History: BYU leads series 35–4
Starting Lineups:

- BYU: Brenna Chase, Shalae Salmon, Maria Albiero, Paisley Johnson, Jasmine Moody
- Utah State: Eliza West, Olivia West, Shannon Dufficy, Hailey Bassett-Meacham, Rachel Brewster

Nov 20	BYU Cougars	62–57(OT)	Utah State Aggies	Dee Glen Smith Spectrum Logan, UT
7:00 p.m. MDT	Scoring by quarter: 7–17, 14–9, 13–14, 21–15, Overtime: 7–2
MW Net	Pts: Shaylee Gonzales 20; Rebs: Shalae Salmon 9 Asts: Brenna Chase, Shaylee Gonzales 3	Recap	Pts: Shannon Dufficy 17; Rebs: Deja Mason 11; Asts: Steph Gorman, Eliza West 3	Attendance: 730; Referees: Melissa Barlow, Michol Murray, Michael Price

=== TCU ===
Series History: BYU leads series 10–8
Starting Lineups:

- BYU: Brenna Chase, Shalae Salmon, Maria Albiero, Paisley Johnson, Jasmine Moody
- TCU: Amy Okonkwo, Jayde Woods, Lauren Heard, Jordan Moore, Kianna Ray

Nov 23	BYU Cougars	61–58	TCU Lady Frogs	Viejas Arena San Diego, CA
7:15 p.m. MST	Scoring by quarter: 21–16, 12–19, 16–11, 12–12
	Pts: Brenna Chase 18; Rebs: Jasmine Moody 10; Asts: Paisley Johnson 6	Recap	Pts: Kianna Ray 15; Rebs: Amy Okonkwo 8 Asts: Kianna Ray 5	Attendance: 703; Referees: Jack Jones, Adria Molina, Tiffany Jump

=== Cal Baptist ===
Series History: First Meeting
Starting Lineups:

- BYU: Brenna Chase, Shalae Salmon, Maria Albiero, Paisley Johnson, Jasmine Moody
- Cal Baptist: Ane Olaeta, Emma Meriggioli, Delacy Brown, Tiena Afu, Britney Thomas

Nov 24	BYU Cougars	76–69	Cal Baptist Lancers	Viejas Arena San Diego, CA
5:00 p.m. PST	Scoring by quarter: 13–20, 23–13, 19–25, 21–11
	Pts: Shaylee Gonzales 22; Rebs: Shaylee Gonzales 10; Asts: Shaylee Gonzales 8	Recap	Pts: Ane Olaeta 24; Rebs: Britney Thomas 13; Asts: Ane Olaeta 7	Attendance: 822; Referees: Peter Contreras, Scott Fruehling, Tiffany Jump

=== Southern Utah ===
Broadcasters: Kylee Young
Series History: BYU leads series 18–3
Starting Lineups:

- BYU: Brenna Chase, Shalae Salmon, Maria Albiero, Paisley Johnson, Jasmine Moody
- Southern Utah: Rebecca Cardenas, Ashley Larsen, Megan Kamps, Breanu Reid, Hannah Robins

Nov 27	BYU Cougars	64–67	Southern Utah Thunderbirds	America First Events Center Cedar City, UT
6:30 p.m. MST	Scoring by quarter: 17–12, 18–12, 9–23, 20–20
Pluto TV	Pts: Brenna Chase 14; Rebs: Shaylee Gonzales 6 Asts: Shaylee Gonzales 6	Recap	Pts: Harley Hansen 18; Rebs: Harley Hansen 8 Asts: Rebecca Cardenas 7	Attendance: 1,021; Referees: Robert Scofield, Bart Baldwin, Tyler Trimble

=== Utah Valley ===
Broadcasters: Matthew Baiamonte
Series History: BYU leads series 8–0
Starting Lineups:

- BYU: Brenna Chase, Shaylee Gonzales, Shalae Salmon, Caitlyn Alldredge, Paisley Johnson
- Utah Valley: Maria Carvalho, Eve Braslis, Alexis Cortez, Emma Jones, Jordan Holland

Nov 29	BYU Cougars	77–51	Utah Valley Wolverines	Lockhart Arena Orem, UT
11:00 a.m. MST	Scoring by quarter: 18–11, 22–17, 21–13, 16–10
UVUtv	Pts: Shaylee Gonzales 23; Rebs: Shalae Salmon 10; Asts: Brenna Chase 7	Recap	Pts: Alexis Cortez 10; Rebs: Sophia Jacobsson, Madison Grange 5 Asts: Sophia Jacobsson 3	Attendance: 1,605; Referees: Steve Belnap, Shelley Nakasone, Cheryl Flores

=== Utah ===
Broadcasters: Krista Blunk & Rosalyn Gold-Onwude
Series History: BYU leads series 63–42
Starting Lineups:

- BYU: Brenna Chase, Shaylee Gonzales, Shalae Salmon, Caitlyn Alldredge, Paisley Johnson
- Utah: Megan Huff, Dru Gylten, Erika Bean, Daneesha Provo, Dre'Una Edwards

Dec 8	BYU Cougars	67–78	Utah Utes	Huntsman Center Salt Lake City, UT
6:30 p.m. MST	Scoring by quarter: 16–18, 15–16, 16–24, 20–20
P12 MTN	Pts: Brenna Chase, Paisley Johnson 17; Rebs: Sara Hamson 5 Asts: Shaylee Gonzales 5	Recap	Pts: Megan Huff 28; Rebs: Dre'Una Edwards 15; Asts: Dru Gylten 8	Attendance: 6,106; Referees: Bart Baldwin, Shelley Nakasone, Robert Scofield

=== Colorado State ===
Broadcasters: Spencer Linton & Lauren McClain
Series History: BYU leads series 54–24
Starting Lineups:

- Colorado State: Taylor Mole, Lena Svanholm, Mollie Mounsey, Lore Devos, Tatum Neubert
- BYU: Brenna Chase, Shaylee Gonzales, Shalae Salmon, Paisley Johnson, Babalu Ugwu

Dec 15	Colorado State Rams	42–51	BYU Cougars	Marriott Center Provo, UT
2:00 p.m. MST	Scoring by quarter: 10–10, 8–10, 12–13, 12–18
BYUtv	Pts: Mollie Mounsey 21; Rebs: Mollie Mounsey 8 Asts: Grace Colaivalu 6	Recap	Pts: Shaylee Gonzales 29; Rebs: Paisley Johnson 11; Asts: Shaylee Gonzales 4	Attendance: 500; Referees: Not Listed

=== Northern Colorado ===
Broadcasters: Robbie Bullough
Series History: BYU leads series 5–4
Starting Lineups:

- Northern Colorado: Krystal Leger-Walker, Savannah Smith, Alexis Chapman, Ali Meyer, Bridget Hintz
- BYU: Brenna Chase, Shaylee Gonzales, Shalae Salmon, Paisley Johnson, Babalu Ugwu

Dec 21	Northern Colorado Bears	50–70	BYU Cougars	Marriott Center Provo, UT
12:00 p.m. MST	Scoring by quarter: 17–11, 5–22, 10–13, 18–24
TheW.tv	Pts: Savannah Smith 18; Rebs: Ali Meyer 13; Asts: Abby Kain 3	Recap	Pts: Brenna Chase 15; Rebs: Shalae Salmon 7 Asts: Paisley Johnson 6	Attendance: 681; Referees: Sean Martin, Kaili Kimura, Michol Murray

=== Santa Clara ===
Broadcasters: Joe Ritzo
Series History: BYU leads series 15–2
Starting Lineups:

- BYU: Brenna Chase, Shaylee Gonzales, Shalae Salmon, Paisley Johnson, Babalu Ugwu
- Santa Clara: Tia Hay, Joeseta Fatuesi, Lauren Yearwood, Ashlyn Herlihy, Emily Wolph

Dec 29	BYU Cougars	54–44	Santa Clara Broncos	Leavey Center Santa Clara, CA
2:00 p.m. PST	Scoring by quarter: 13–9, 11–14, 17–15, 13–6
TheW.tv	Pts: Shaylee Gonzales 13; Rebs: Shaylee Gonzales 7 Asts: Brenna Chase 4	Recap	Pts: Tia Hay 11; Rebs: Lauren Yearwood 9 Asts: Tia Hay 11	Attendance: 351; Referees: Michol Murray, Marc Merritt, Shelley Nakasone

=== San Francisco ===
Broadcasters: George Devine
Series History: BYU leads series 17–5
Starting Lineups:

- BYU: Brenna Chase, Shaylee Gonzales, Shalae Salmon, Paisley Johnson, Babalu Ugwu
- San Francisco: Kia Vaalavirta, Marta Galic, Moa Lundqvist, Lucija Kostic, Shannon Powell

Dec 31	BYU Cougars	67–59	San Francisco Dons	War Memorial Gymnasium San Francisco, CA
3:00 p.m. PST	Scoring by quarter: 9–16, 18–12, 23–20, 17–11
TheW.tv	Pts: Shaylee Gonzales 19; Rebs: Shaylee Gonzales 10; Asts: Brenna Chase 5	Recap	Pts: Julia Nielacna 14; Rebs: Lucija Kostic 8 Asts: Shannon Powell	Attendance: 263; Referees: Michol Murray, Ifeiynwa Seales, Brad Schmidt

=== Pepperdine ===
Broadcasters: Spencer Linton & Kristen Kozlowski
Series History: BYU leads series 17–2
Starting Lineups:

- Pepperdine: Malia Bambrick, Deezha Battle, Barbara Sitanggan, Skye Lindsay, Yasmine Robinson-Bac
- BYU: Brenna Chase, Shaylee Gonzales, Shalae Salmon, Paisley Johnson, Babalu Ugwu

Jan 3	Pepperdine Waves	58–83	BYU Cougars	Marriott Center Provo, UT
7:00 p.m. MST	Scoring by quarter: 16–26, 13–14, 15–16, 14–27
BYUtv	Pts: Yasmine Robinson-Bac 22; Rebs: Megan House 8 Asts: Malia Bambrick 3	Recap	Pts: Paisley Johnson 24; Rebs: Sara Hamson 10; Asts: Brenna Chase, Shaylee Gonzales 7	Attendance: 679; Referees: Alejandro Moreno, Kenneth Nash, Kyle Bacon

=== Loyola Marymount ===
Broadcasters: Spencer Linton & Kristen Kozlowski
Series History: BYU leads series 15–2
Starting Lineups:

- Loyola Marymount: Chelsey Gipson, Jasmine Jones, Bree Alford, Gabby Green, Cierra Belvin
- BYU: Brenna Chase, Shaylee Gonzales, Shalae Salmon, Paisley Johnson, Babalu Ugwu

Jan 5	Loyola Marymount Lions	44–55	BYU Cougars	Marriott Center Provo, UT
2:00 p.m. MST	Scoring by quarter: 16–14, 9–16, 11–17, 8–8
BYUtv	Pts: Gabby Green 14; Rebs: Bree Alford 10; Asts: Gabby Green 6	Recap	Pts: Brenna Chase 14; Rebs: Babalu Ugwu, Jasmine Moody 7 Asts: Shaylee Gonzales 7	Attendance: 852; Referees: Brenda Pantoja, Cheryl Flores, Cheryll Blue

=== Pacific ===
Broadcasters: Don Gubbins
Series History: BYU leads series 13–4
Starting Lineups:

- BYU: Brenna Chase, Shaylee Gonzales, Shalae Salmon, Paisley Johnson, Babalu Ugwu
- Pacific: Brooklyn McDavid, Isabel Newman, Jessica Blakeslee, Ameela Li, Valerie Higgins

Jan 10	BYU Cougars	77–74	Pacific Tigers	Alex G. Spanos Center Stockton, CA
7:00 p.m. PST	Scoring by quarter: 22–17, 22–20, 19–17, 14–20
TheW.tv	Pts: Shaylee Gonzales, Paisley Johnson 24; Rebs: Shaylee Gonzales 9 Asts: Shalae Salmon 4	Recap	Pts: Brooklyn McDavid 20; Rebs: Valerie Higgins 9 Asts: Ameela Li 7	Attendance: 515; Referees: Cathi Cornell, Teresa Turner, Gordon Torigoe

=== Saint Mary's ===
Broadcasters: Elias Feldman
Series History: Saint Mary's leads series 9–8
Starting Lineups:

- BYU: Brenna Chase, Shaylee Gonzales, Shalae Salmon, Paisley Johnson, Babalu Ugwu
- Saint Mary's: Jasmine Forcadilla, Madeline Holland, Sydney Raggio, Sam Simons, Megan McKay

Jan 12	BYU Cougars	74–73	Saint Mary's Gaels	McKeon Pavilion Moraga, CA
2:00 p.m. PST	Scoring by quarter: 20–20, 19–18, 26–18, 9–17
TheW.tv	Pts: Paisley Johnson 25; Rebs: Brenna Chase 6 Asts: Shaylee Gonzales 5	Recap	Pts: Sam Simons, Megan McKay 16; Rebs: Sydney Raggio, Megan McKay 7 Asts: Madeline Holland 5	Attendance: 531; Referees: Robert Scofield, Anita Ortega, Rochelle Bennett

=== Gonzaga ===
Broadcasters: Spencer Linton & Kristen Kozlowski
Series History: Gonzaga leads series 15–9
Starting Lineups:

- Gonzaga: Zykera Rice, LeeAnne Wirth, Laura Stockton, Katie Campbell, Chandler Smith
- BYU: Brenna Chase, Shaylee Gonzales, Shalae Salmon, Paisley Johnson, Babalu Ugwu

Jan 17	#13/14 Gonzaga Bulldogs	68–70	BYU Cougars	Marriott Center Provo, UT
7:00 p.m. MST	Scoring by quarter: 19–9, 18–16, 18–16, 16–20
BYUtv	Pts: Laura Stockton 15; Rebs: LeeAnn Wirth 7 Asts: Jessie Loera 3	Recap	Pts: Shaylee Gonzales 17; Rebs: Sara Hamson 6 Asts: Brenna Chase 4	Attendance: 1,341; Referees: Shelley Nakasone, Brian Woods, Melissa Barlow

=== Portland ===
Broadcasters: Spencer Linton & Kristen Kozlowski
Series History: BYU leads series 22–4
Starting Lineups:

- Portland: Kate Andersen, Haylee Andrews, Jayce Gorzeman, Julie Spencer, Darian Slaga
- BYU: Brenna Chase, Shaylee Gonzales, Shalae Salmon, Paisley Johnson, Babalu Ugwu

Jan 19	Portland Pilots	71–79	BYU Cougars	Marriott Center Provo, UT
2:00 p.m. MST	Scoring by quarter: 27–15, 17–22, 17–18, 10–24
BYUtv	Pts: Haylee Andrews 19; Rebs: Julie Spencer 10; Asts: Kate Andersen 4	Recap	Pts: Maria Albiero 16; Rebs: Sara Hamson, Jasmine Moody 6 Asts: Shaylee Gonzales 10	Attendance: 1,177; Referees: Ashley Ellis, Alejandro Moreno, Cheryl Flores

=== San Diego ===
Broadcasters: Paula Bott
Series History: BYU leads series 12–6
Starting Lineups:

- BYU: Brenna Chase, Shaylee Gonzales, Shalae Salmon, Paisley Johnson, Babalu Ugwu
- San Diego: Aminata Dosso, Madison Pollock, Sydney Shephard, Sydney Hunter, Patricia Brossman

Jan 26	BYU Cougars	65–56	San Diego Toreros	Jenny Craig Pavilion San Diego, CA
2:00 p.m. PST	Scoring by quarter: 19–16, 12–14, 12–8, 22–18
TheW.tv	Pts: Shaylee Gonzales 17; Rebs: Sara Hamson 9 Asts: Maria Albiero 5	Recap	Pts: Madison Pollock, Sydney Shephard 12; Rebs: Madison Pollock 12; Asts: Patricia Brossman, Madison Pollock, Sydney Shephard 4	Attendance: 433; Referees: Brenda Pantoja, Tiffany Bird, Sydney Mott

=== Loyola Marymount ===
Broadcasters: Jonathan Grayson
Series History: BYU leads series 16–2
Starting Lineups:

- BYU: Brenna Chase, Shaylee Gonzales, Shalae Salmon, Paisley Johnson, Babalu Ugwu
- Loyola Marymount: Chelsey Gipson, Andee Velasco, Jasmine Jones, Bree Alford, Cierra Belvin

Jan 31	#25/RV BYU Cougars	58–61	Loyola Marymount Lions	Gersten Pavilion Los Angeles, CA
5:00 p.m. PST	Scoring by quarter: 11–16, 12–10, 15–16, 20–19
TheW.tv	Pts: Paisley Johnson 16; Rebs: Brenna Chase 5 Asts: Paisley Johnson 6	Recap	Pts: Jasmine Jones 21; Rebs: Bree Alford 13; Asts: Andee Velasco 6	Attendance: 246; Referees: Not Listed

=== Pepperdine ===
Broadcasters: Darren Preston
Series History: BYU leads series 18–2
Starting Lineups:

- BYU: Brenna Chase, Shaylee Gonzales, Shalae Salmon, Paisley Johnson, Babalu Ugwu
- Pepperdine: Malia Bambrick, Megan House, Barbara Sitanggan, Yasmine Robinson-Bac, Mia Satie

Feb 2	#25/RV BYU Cougars	65–79	BYU Cougars	Firestone Fieldhouse Malibu, CA
2:45 p.m. PST	Scoring by quarter: 19–18, 10–21, 15–17, 21–23
TheW.tv	Pts: Shalae Salmon 13; Rebs: Shaylee Gonzales 7 Asts: Shaylee Gonzales 3	Recap	Pts: Yasmine Robinson-Bac 17; Rebs: Yasmine Robinson-Bac 11; Asts: Megan House, Deezha Battle 5	Attendance: N/A; Referees: Jen Zylstra, Rochelle Bennett, Bart Baldwin

=== Saint Mary's ===
Broadcasters: Spencer Linton & Kristen Kozlowski
Series History: Series Even 9–9
Starting Lineups:

- Saint Mary's: Jasmine Forcadilla, Sydney Raggio, Sam Simons, Emily Codding, Megan McKay
- BYU: Brenna Chase, Shaylee Gonzales, Shalae Salmon, Paisley Johnson, Babalu Ugwu

Feb 7	Saint Mary's Gaels	78–75	BYU Cougars	Marriott Center Provo, UT
11:00 a.m. MST	Scoring by quarter: 21–12, 18–23, 14–25, 25–15
BYUtv	Pts: Megan McKay 19; Rebs: Sydney Raggio 13; Asts: Sydney Raggio 5	Recap	Pts: Paisley Johnson 20; Rebs: Babalu Ugwu, Jasmine Moody 7 Asts: Brenna Chase 6	Attendance: 3,981; Referees: Shelley Nakasone, Tiffany Bird, Michol Murray

=== Pacific ===
Broadcasters: Spencer Linton & Kristen Kozlowski
Series History: BYU leads series 14–4
Starting Lineups:

- Pacific: Brooklyn McDavid, Isabel Newman, Jessica Blakeslee, Ameela Li, Valerie Higgins
- BYU: Brenna Chase, Shaylee Gonzales, Shalae Salmon, Paisley Johnson, Sara Hamson

Feb 9	Pacific Tigers	49–75	BYU Cougars	Marriott Center Provo, UT
2:00 p.m. MST	Scoring by quarter: 9–24, 10–20, 13–21, 17–10
BYUtv	Pts: Valerie Higgins 18; Rebs: Brooklyn McDavid 10; Asts: Ameela Li, Valerie Higgins, Chelsea Lidy, Josephine Millard, Kaylin Randhawa 1	Recap	Pts: Shaylee Gonzales 18; Rebs: Babalu Ugwu 8 Asts: Paisley Johnson 4	Attendance: 959; Referees: Corey Long, Teresa Turner, Charles Gonzales

=== Portland ===
Broadcasters: Tom Kolker
Series History: BYU leads series 23–4
Starting Lineups:

- BYU: Brenna Chase, Shaylee Gonzales, Shalae Salmon, Paisley Johnson, Sara Hamson
- Portland: Haylee Andrews, Lisa-Marie Kaempf, Jayce Gorzeman, Julie Spencer, Darian Slaga

Feb 14	BYU Cougars	70–69	Portland Pilots	Chiles Center Portland, OR
7:00 p.m. PST	Scoring by quarter: 28–12, 9–25, 15–13, 18–19
TheW.tv	Pts: Brenna Chase 24; Rebs: Shaylee Gonzales 9 Asts: Paisley Johnson 7	Recap	Pts: Julie Spencer 25; Rebs: Julie Spencer 12; Asts: Haylee Andrews 10	Attendance: 506; Referees: Gordon Torigoe, Kimberly Hobbs, Benny Luna

=== Gonzaga ===
Broadcasters: Greg Heister, Stephanie Hawk-Freeman, & Taylor Brooks
Series History: Gonzaga leads series 15–10
Starting Lineups:

- BYU: Brenna Chase, Shaylee Gonzales, Shalae Salmon, Paisley Johnson, Sara Hamson
- Gonzaga: Zykera Rice, LeeAnne Wirth, Laura Stockton, Katie Campbell, Chandler Smith

Feb 16	BYU Cougars	66–64	#13/12 Gonzaga Bulldogs	McCarthey Athletic Center Spokane, WA
2:00 p.m. PST	Scoring by quarter: 24–13, 19–23, 15–15, 8–13
SWX	Pts: Shaylee Gonzales 19; Rebs: Sara Hamson 9 Asts: Brenna Chase 5	Recap	Pts: Zykera Rice 20; Rebs: Jenn Wirth, Chandler Smith 6 Asts: Laura Stockton 3	Attendance: 6,000; Referees: Penny Davis, Robert Scofield, Cheryll Blue

=== San Diego ===
Broadcasters: Dave McCann & Kristen Kozlowski
Series History: BYU leads series 13–6
Starting Lineups:

- San Diego: Aminata Dosso, Madison Pollock, Sydney Shephard, Sydney Hunter, Patricia Brossman
- BYU: Brenna Chase, Shaylee Gonzales, Shalae Salmon, Paisley Johnson, Sara Hamson

Feb 23	San Diego Toreros	68–80	BYU Cougars	Marriott Center Provo, UT
2:00 p.m. MST	Scoring by quarter: 15–19, 11–23, 18–22, 24–16
BYUtv	Pts: Patricia Brossman 24; Rebs: Patricia Brossman 11; Asts: Kiera Oakry 4	Recap	Pts: Brenna Chase, Shaylee Gonzales 19; Rebs: Paisley Johnson 6 Asts: Shaylee Gonzales 6	Attendance: 1,225; Referees: Alejandro Moreno, Kenneth Nash, Melissa Barlow

=== San Francisco ===
Broadcasters: Robbie Bullough & Makenzi Pulsipher
Series History: BYU leads series 18–5
Starting Lineups:

- San Francisco: Moa Lundqvist, Nia Alexander, Lucija Kostic, Shannon Powell, Abby Rathbun
- BYU: Brenna Chase, Shaylee Gonzales, Caitlyn Alldredge, Paisley Johnson, Sara Hamson

Feb 28	San Francisco Dons	59–82	BYU Cougars	Marriott Center Provo, UT
7:00 p.m. MST	Scoring by quarter: 15–21, 12–20, 14–22, 18–19
TheW.tv	Pts: Nia Alexander 18; Rebs: Lucija Kostic 8 Asts: Moa Lundqvist, Lucija Kostic, Abby Rathbun 4	Recap	Pts: Shaylee Gonzales 16; Rebs: Sara Hamson 12; Asts: Paisley Johnson 4	Attendance: 556; Referees: Brian Woods, Lorena Ahumada, Steve Belnap

=== Santa Clara ===
Broadcasters: Spencer Linton, Kristen Kozlowski, & Lauren McClain
Series History: BYU leads series 15–2
Starting Lineups:

- Santa Clara: Tia Hay, Lauren Yearwood, Naomi Jimenez, Ashlyn Herlihy, Emily Wolph
- BYU: Brenna Chase, Shaylee Gonzales, Caitlyn, Alldredge, Paisley Johnson, Sara Hamson

Mar 2	Santa Clara Broncos	64–69	BYU Cougars	Marriott Center Provo, UT
2:00 p.m. MST	Scoring by quarter: 13–18, 14–14, 12–24, 25–13
BYUtv	Pts: Tia Hay 18; Rebs: Lauren Yearwood 8 Asts: Tia Hay 5	Recap	Pts: Sara Hamson 18; Rebs: Shaylee Gonzales 10; Asts: Shaylee Gonzales 7	Attendance: 1,139; Referees: Charles Gonzales, Cheryll Blue, Nocole Leon

=== Pepperdine ===
Broadcasters: Spencer Linton & Kristen Kozlowski
Series History: BYU leads series 18–3
Starting Lineups:

- Pepperdine: Malia Bambrick, Megan House, Barbara Sitanggan, Yasmine Robinson-Bac, Mia Satie
- BYU: Brenna Chase, Shaylee Gonzales, Caitlyn, Alldredge, Paisley Johnson, Sara Hamson

Mar 11	Pepperdine Waves	63–68	BYU Cougars	Orleans Arena Paradise, NV
2:00 p.m. PDT	Scoring by quarter: 18–17, 20–15, 14–18, 11–18
BYUtv	Pts: Yasmine Robinson-Bac 19; Rebs: Yasmine Robinson-Bac 14; Asts: Barbara Sitanggan 4	Recap	Pts: Paisley Johnson 20; Rebs: Shaylee Gonzales 8 Asts: Brenna Chase, Paisley Johnson 5	Attendance: 5,511; Referees: Michol Murray, Kyle Bacon, InFini Robinson

=== Gonzaga ===
Broadcasters: Elise Woodward & Dan Hughes (ESPN)/ Greg Wrubell & Kristen Kozlowski (BYU Radio)
Series History: Gonzaga leads series 15–11
Starting Lineups:

- BYU: Brenna Chase, Shaylee Gonzales, Shalae Salmon, Paisley Johnson, Sara Hamson
- Gonzaga: Zykera Rice, LeeAnne Wirth, Jessie Loera, Katie Campbell, Chandler Smith

Mar 12	BYU Cougars	82–68	#12/11 Gonzaga Bulldogs	Orleans Arena Paradise, NV
1:00 p.m. PDT	Scoring by quarter: 19–23, 23–7, 23–26, 17–12
ESPNU	Pts: Brenna Chase 25; Rebs: Sara Hamson 8 Asts: Shaylee Gonzales, Paisley Johnson 4	Recap	Pts: Zykera Rice 25; Rebs: Jenn Wirth 6 Asts: Jessie Loera 7	Attendance: 5,892; Referees: Brenda Pantoja, Cheryl Flores, Benny Luna

== Rankings ==
2018–19 NCAA Division I women's basketball rankings

Regular season polls
Poll	Pre- Season	Week 2	Week 3	Week 4	Week 5	Week 6	Week 7	Week 8	Week 9	Week 10	Week 11	Week 12	Week 13	Week 14	Week 15	Week 16	Week 17	Week 18	Week 19	Final
AP												RV	25	RV		RV	RV	RV	RV	N/A
Coaches													RV			RV	RV			RV

Legend
	Increase in ranking
	Decrease in ranking
	No change
(RV)	Received votes
(NR)	Not ranked

== See also ==
- 2018–19 BYU Cougars men's basketball team
