= 2018–19 Portland Pilots women's basketball team =

Intercollegiate basketball season

2018–19 Portland Pilots women's basketball
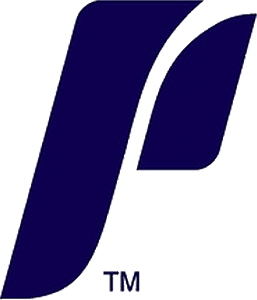
- Conference: West Coast Conference
- Record: 13–17 (5–13 WCC)
- Head coach: Cheryl Sorenson (5th season)
- Assistant coaches: Steve Lowe; Tiffany Gibson; Skyler Young
- Home arena: Chiles Center

2018–19 West Coast Conference women's basketball standings
	Conf.				Overall
Team	W		L	PCT	W		L	PCT
No. 16 Gonzaga	16	–	2	.889	29	–	5	.853
BYU †	15	–	3	.833	26	–	7	.788
Pepperdine	12	–	6	.667	22	–	12	.647
Saint Mary's	12	–	6	.667	21	–	12	.636
Pacific	10	–	8	.556	19	–	13	.594
Loyola Marymount	10	–	8	.556	18	–	15	.545
Santa Clara	6	–	12	.333	14	–	17	.452
Portland	5	–	13	.278	13	–	17	.433
San Diego	2	–	16	.111	9	–	21	.300
San Francisco	2	–	16	.111	7	–	24	.226
† 2019 WCC tournament winner As of March 23, 2019; Rankings from AP poll

The 2018–19 Portland Pilots women's basketball team represented the University of Portland in the 2018–19 NCAA Division I women's basketball season. The Pilots were led by fifth year coach Cheryl Sorensen. They played their homes games at Chiles Center and were members of the West Coast Conference. They finished the season 13–17, 5–13 in WCC play to finish in eighth place. They lost in the first round of the WCC women's tournament to San Francisco.

On March 12, 2019, Cheryl Sorensen resigned as coach; her overall record at Portland was 33–117. On March 27, former George Fox head coach Michael Meek was appointed her replacement.

== Roster ==
2018–19 Portland Pilots women's basketball team
Players
Coaches

Pos.	#	Name	Height	Year	Previous school	Hometown
G	1	Kate Anderson	5 ft 9 in (1.75 m)	Jr	Jesuit HS	Portland, OR
F	2	Liana Kaitu'u	6 ft 0 in (1.83 m)	Fr	East HS	Salt Lake City, UT
G	3	Josie Matz	5 ft 10 in (1.78 m)	So	Wilson HS	Tacoma, WA
G	10	Haylee Andrews	5 ft 9 in (1.75 m)	Fr	Townsville State HS	Townsville, Australia
F	11	Lisa-Marie Kaempf	6 ft 2 in (1.88 m)	Sr	Friedrich-Dessauer-Gymnasium; Midland College	Aschaffenburg, Germany
F	14	Jayce Gorzeman	6 ft 0 in (1.83 m)	So	Mayfield HS	Las Cruces, NM
G	15	Maddie Muhlheim	5 ft 7 in (1.7 m)	So	Sunset HS	Portland, OR
F	20	Erika Kankfelt	6 ft 0 in (1.83 m)	RS Fr	Makelanrinne Sports	Espoo, Finland
F	22	Kristina Wooldridge	6 ft 2 in (1.88 m)	So	Bishop O'Dowd HS	San Leandro, CA
F	23	Julie Spencer	6 ft 2 in (1.88 m)	Sr	W.F. West HS	Chehalis, WA
F	24	Elena Alaxi	6 ft 3 in (1.91 m)	Fr	Colegio San Agustín	Madrid, Spain
F	30	Keala Quinlan	6 ft 0 in (1.83 m)	Jr	Roosevelt HS	Papakolea, HI
G	32	Darian Slaga	5 ft 8 in (1.73 m)	Sr	Boulder Creek HS	Prescott Valley, AZ
F	35	Shasta Parker	6 ft 1 in (1.85 m)	Fr	San Martin HS	Novato, CA
C	44	Lauren Walker	6 ft 5 in (1.96 m)	So	Cardinal Newman HS	Windsor, CA

Head coach

- Cheryl Sorenson (Washington)

Assistant coach(es)

- Steve Lowe (Central Washington)
- Tiffany Gibson (Cal State Bakersfield)
- Skyler Young (Western Michigan)

Legend

- (C) Team captain
- (S) Suspended
- (I) Ineligible
- (W) Walk-on
- Injured
- Current redshirt

Roster

== Schedule and results ==
Date time, TV	Rank^{#}	Opponent^{#}	Result	Record	Site (attendance) city, state
Exhibition
Nov 3, 2018*; 4:30 pm		Puget Sound	W 88–45		Chiles Center (260); Portland, OR
Non-conference regular season
Nov 8, 2018*; 2:00 pm		at Utah Valley	W 65–60	1–0	Lockhart Arena (247); Orem, UT
Nov 12, 2018*; 4:00 pm		at Weber State	W 89–73	2–0	Dee Events Center (569); Ogden, UT
Nov 16, 2018*; 4:30 pm		at Hawaii; Bank of Hawaii Classic	W 72–65	3–0	Stan Sheriff Center (1,236); Honolulu, HI
Nov 18, 2018*; 2:00 pm		vs. Arizona; Bank of Hawaii Classic	L 70–92	3–1	Stan Sheriff Center; Honolulu, HI
Nov 24, 2018*; 12:00 pm		Cal State Fullerton	W 83–74	4–1	Chiles Center (513); Portland, OR
Nov 28, 2018*; 7:00 pm		Utah State	W 61–54	5–1	Chiles Center (359); Portland, OR
Dec 1, 2018*; 2:00 pm		at Portland State	L 79–92	5–2	Viking Pavilion (425); Portland, OR
Dec 7, 2018*; 7:00 pm		Warner Pacific	W 98–63	6–2	Chiles Center (471); Portland, OR
Dec 9, 2018*; 2:00 pm		Willamette	W 82–27	7–2	Chiles Center (269); Portland, OR
Dec 16, 2018*; 2:00 pm		UC Irvine	L 69–84	7–3	Chiles Center (217); Portland, OR
Dec 18, 2018*; 7:00 pm		Air Force	W 79–60	8–3	Chiles Center (286); Portland, OR
WCC regular season
Dec 29, 2018; 2:00 pm		at Pepperdine	L 68–82	8–4 (0–1)	Firestone Fieldhouse; Malibu, CA
Dec 31, 2018; 2:00 pm		at Loyola Marymount	L 58–76	8–5 (0–2)	Gersten Pavilion (236); Los Angeles, CA
Jan 3, 2019; 7:00 pm		Pacific	L 66–76	8–6 (0–3)	Chiles Center (274); Portland, OR
Jan 5, 2019; 2:00 pm		Saint Mary's	L 81–89	8–7 (0–4)	Chiles Center (304); Portland, OR
Jan 12, 2019; 2:00 pm		at No. 14 Gonzaga	L 71–97	8–8 (0–5)	McCarthey Athletic Center (5,697); Spokane, WA
Jan 17, 2019; 12:00 pm		at San Diego	W 69–60	9–8 (1–5)	Jenny Craig Pavilion (521); San Diego, CA
Jan 19, 2019; 1:00 pm, BYUtv		at BYU	L 71–79	9–9 (1–6)	Marriott Center (1,177); Provo, UT
Jan 24, 2019; 7:00 pm		Santa Clara	L 66–72	9–10 (1–7)	Chiles Center (369); Portland, OR
Jan 26, 2019; 2:00 pm		San Francisco	W 78–73	10–10 (2–7)	Chiles Center (512); Portland, OR
Jan 31, 2019; 6:00 pm		at Saint Mary's	L 85–113	10–11 (2–8)	McKeon Pavilion (232); Moraga, CA
Feb 2, 2019; 4:00 pm		at Pacific	L 67–77	10–12 (2–9)	Alex G. Spanos Center (2,731); Stockton, CA
Feb 9, 2019; 4:30 pm		No. 13 Gonzaga	L 62–93	10–13 (2–10)	Chiles Center (543); Portland, OR
Feb 14, 2019; 7:00 pm		BYU	L 69–70	10–14 (2–11)	Chiles Center (506); Portland, OR
Feb 16, 2019; 2:00 pm		San Diego	W 96–74	11–14 (3–11)	Chiles Center (323); Portland, OR
Feb 21, 2019; 7:00 pm		at San Francisco	W 69–66	12–14 (4–11)	War Memorial Gymnasium (381); San Francisco, CA
Feb 23, 2019; 2:00 pm		at Santa Clara	L 68–106	12–15 (4–12)	Leavey Center (404); Santa Clara, CA
Feb 28, 2018; 7:00 pm		Loyola Marymount	L 54–70	12–16 (4–13)	Chiles Center (288); Portland, OR
Mar 2, 2018; 4:30 pm		Pepperdine	W 85–63	13–16 (5–13)	Chiles Center (431); Portland, OR
WCC Women's Tournament
Mar 7, 2019; 12:00 pm, BYUtv	(8)	vs. (9) San Francisco; First Round	L 69–76	13–17	Orleans Arena (5,234); Paradise, NV
*Non-conference game. ^{#}Rankings from AP Poll. (#) Tournament seedings in parentheses. All times are in Pacific Time.

== See also ==
- 2018–19 Portland Pilots men's basketball team
