= 2018–19 Santa Clara Broncos women's basketball team =

Intercollegiate basketball season

2018–19 Santa Clara Broncos women's basketball
- Conference: West Coast Conference
- Record: 14–17 (6–12 WCC)
- Head coach: Bill Carr (3rd season)
- Assistant coaches: Michael Floyd; Kristin Iwanaga; Taelor Karr
- Home arena: Leavey Center

2018–19 West Coast Conference women's basketball standings
	Conf.				Overall
Team	W		L	PCT	W		L	PCT
No. 16 Gonzaga	16	–	2	.889	29	–	5	.853
BYU †	15	–	3	.833	26	–	7	.788
Pepperdine	12	–	6	.667	22	–	12	.647
Saint Mary's	12	–	6	.667	21	–	12	.636
Pacific	10	–	8	.556	19	–	13	.594
Loyola Marymount	10	–	8	.556	18	–	15	.545
Santa Clara	6	–	12	.333	14	–	17	.452
Portland	5	–	13	.278	13	–	17	.433
San Diego	2	–	16	.111	9	–	21	.300
San Francisco	2	–	16	.111	7	–	24	.226
† 2019 WCC tournament winner As of March 23, 2019; Rankings from AP poll

The 2018–19 Santa Clara Broncos women's basketball team represented Santa Clara University in the 2018–19 college basketball season. The Broncos werr led by third year head coach Bill Carr. The Broncos were members of the West Coast Conference and played their home games at the Leavey Center. They finished the season 14–17, 6–12 in WCC play to finish in seventh place. They advanced to the second round of the WCC women's tournament, where they lost to Pacific.

== Roster ==
2018–19 Santa Clara Broncos women's basketball team
Players
Coaches

Pos.	#	Name	Height	Year	Previous school	Hometown
F	0	Erica Meyer	6 ft 3 in (1.91 m)	RS Jr	Wilton; Providence	Wilton, CT
G	3	Lexie Pritchard	5 ft 10 in (1.78 m)	Fr	West Linn	West Linn, OR
G	4	Dru Toleafoa	6 ft 0 in (1.83 m)	Sr	Brigidine College Randwick	Sydney, Australia
G	11	Tia Hay	5 ft 7 in (1.7 m)	Jr	Saint Francis; Salt Lake CC	Melbourne, Australia
F	13	Joeseta Fatuesi	6 ft 4 in (1.93 m)	RS Sr	Wilcox HS; Utah	Santa Clara, CA
F	20	Lauren Yearwood	6 ft 3 in (1.91 m)	RS Jr	Oak Bay HS; Oregon	Victoria, BC
F	21	Naomi Jimenez	6 ft 0 in (1.83 m)	Jr	Westtown School	Albrightsville, PA
F	22	Ashlyn Herlihy	6 ft 1 in (1.85 m)	RS So	Arroyo Grande	Arroyo Grande, CA
G	23	Lindsey VanAllen	5 ft 9 in (1.75 m)	Fr	Mesquite	Gilbert, AZ
G	24	Madison Piper	5 ft 11 in (1.8 m)	So	Lawrence Free State	Lawrence, KS
G	25	Emily Wolph	5 ft 5 in (1.65 m)	RS Jr	Desert Vista	Phoenix, AZ
F	30	Andraya Flor	6 ft 0 in (1.83 m)	Sr	Seattle Prep	Seattle, WA
F	33	Tamia Braggs	6 ft 2 in (1.88 m)	Jr	Lincoln	Tacoma, WA
G	44	Charise Holloway	5 ft 9 in (1.75 m)	RS Sr	St. Mary's; Arizona	Tracy, CA

Head coach

- Bill Carr (San Francisco)

Assistant coach(es)

- Michael Floyd (Murray State)
- Kristin Iwanaga (California)
- Taelor Karr (Gonzaga)

Legend

- (C) Team captain
- (S) Suspended
- (I) Ineligible
- (W) Walk-on
- Injured
- Current redshirt

Roster

== Schedule and results ==
Date time, TV	Rank^{#}	Opponent^{#}	Result	Record	Site (attendance) city, state
Exhibition
Oct 30, 2018*; 7:00 pm		Academy of Art	W 74–53		Leavey Center (219); Santa Clara, CA
Non-conference regular season
Nov 6, 2018*; 7:00 pm		Sonoma State	W 98–38	1–0	Leavey Center (312); Santa Clara, CA
Nov 10, 2018*; 4:00 pm		Nevada	W 56–48	2–0	Leavey Center (381); Santa Clara, CA
Nov 13, 2018*; 3:00 pm		San Diego State	W 60–43	3–0	Leavey Center (234); Santa Clara, CA
Nov 17, 2018*; 2:00 pm		at USC	L 46–77	3–1	Galen Center (512); Los Angeles, CA
Nov 19, 2018*; 7:00 pm		at Cal State Fullerton	W 64–60 ^{OT}	4–1	Titan Gym (251); Fullerton, CA
Nov 24, 2018*; 2:00 pm		Missouri State	W 77–73	5–1	Leavey Center (252); Santa Clara, CA
Nov 30, 2018*; 4:00 pm		Cal State Northridge	L 38–53	5–2	Leavey Center (305); Santa Clara, CA
Dec 9, 2018*; 2:00 pm		at No. 8 Oregon State	L 31–82	5–3	Gill Coliseum (4,015); Corvallis, OR
Dec 12, 2018*; 5:00 pm		at Fresno State	L 53–80	5–4	Save Mart Center (2,001); Fresno, CA
Dec 15, 2018*; 4:00 pm		at San Jose State	W 62–56	6–4	Event Center Arena (474); San Jose, CA
Dec 20, 2018*; 2:00 pm		Grand Canyon	W 75–55	7–4	Leavey Center (229); Santa Clara, CA
WCC regular season
Dec 29, 2018; 2:00 pm		BYU	L 44–54	7–5 (0–1)	Leavey Center (351); Santa Clara, CA
Dec 31, 2018; 2:00 pm		San Diego	L 49–57	7–6 (0–2)	Leavey Center (317); Santa Clara, CA
Jan 5, 2019; 2:00 pm		at San Francisco	W 71–66 ^{OT}	8–6 (1–2)	War Memorial Gymnasium (268); San Francisco, CA
Jan 10, 2019; 7:00 pm		at Pepperdine	L 48–74	8–7 (1–3)	Firestone Fieldhouse; Malibu, CA
Jan 12, 2019; 1:00 pm		at Loyola Marymount	W 83–75 ^{3OT}	9–7 (2–3)	Gersten Pavilion (198); Los Angeles, CA
Jan 17, 2019; 7:00 pm		Pacific	L 70–74	9–8 (2–4)	Leavey Center (615); Santa Clara, CA
Jan 19, 2019; 2:00 pm		Saint Mary's	L 59–83	9–9 (2–5)	Leavey Center (384); Santa Clara, CA
Jan 24, 2019; 7:00 pm		at Portland	W 72–66	10–9 (3–5)	Chiles Center (369); Portland, OR
Jan 26, 2019; 2:00 pm		at No. 18 Gonzaga	L 61–78	10–10 (3–6)	McCarthey Athletic Center (6,000); Spokane, WA
Feb 2, 2019; 2:00 pm		San Francisco	L 49–57	10–11 (3–7)	Leavey Center (372); Santa Clara, CA
Feb 7, 2019; 7:00 pm		Loyola Marymount	L 60–69	10–12 (3–8)	Leavey Center (380); Santa Clara, CA
Feb 9, 2019; 2:00 pm		Pepperdine	L 74–76	10–13 (3–9)	Leavey Center (1,216); Santa Clara, CA
Feb 14, 2019; 6:30 pm		at Saint Mary's	L 68–81	10–14 (3–10)	McKeon Pavilion (265); Moraga, CA
Feb 16, 2019; 2:00 pm		at Pacific	W 88–83	11–14 (4–10)	Alex G. Spanos Center (901); Stockton, CA
Feb 21, 2019; 7:00 pm		Gonzaga	L 61–74	11–15 (4–11)	Leavey Center (394); Santa Clara, CA
Feb 23, 2019; 2:00 pm		Portland	W 106–68	12–15 (5–11)	Leavey Center (404); Santa Clara, CA
Feb 28, 2019; 6:00 pm		at San Diego	W 77–68	13–15 (6–11)	Jenny Craig Pavilion (327); San Diego, CA
Mar 2, 2019; 1:00 pm, BYUtv		at BYU	L 64–69	13–16 (6–12)	Marriott Center (1,139); Provo, UT
WCC Women's Tournament
Mar 7, 2019; 2:00 pm, BYUtv	(7)	vs. (10) San Diego; First Round	W 63–59	14–16	Orleans Arena (5,234); Paradise, NV
Mar 8, 2019; 2:00 pm, BYUtv	(7)	vs. (6) Pacific; Second Round	L 60–76	14–17	Orleans Arena (5,237); Paradise, NV
*Non-conference game. ^{#}Rankings from AP Poll. (#) Tournament seedings in parentheses. All times are in Pacific Time.

== See also ==
- 2018–19 Santa Clara Broncos men's basketball team
