= 2018–19 San Francisco Dons women's basketball team =

Intercollegiate basketball season

2018–19 San Francisco Dons women's basketball
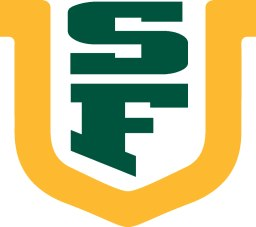
- Conference: West Coast Conference
- Record: 7–24 (2–16 WCC)
- Head coach: Molly Goodenbour (3rd season)
- Assistant coaches: Janell Jones; Katy Steding; Arthur Moreira
- Home arena: War Memorial Gymnasium

2018–19 West Coast Conference women's basketball standings
	Conf.				Overall
Team	W		L	PCT	W		L	PCT
No. 16 Gonzaga	16	–	2	.889	29	–	5	.853
BYU †	15	–	3	.833	26	–	7	.788
Pepperdine	12	–	6	.667	22	–	12	.647
Saint Mary's	12	–	6	.667	21	–	12	.636
Pacific	10	–	8	.556	19	–	13	.594
Loyola Marymount	10	–	8	.556	18	–	15	.545
Santa Clara	6	–	12	.333	14	–	17	.452
Portland	5	–	13	.278	13	–	17	.433
San Diego	2	–	16	.111	9	–	21	.300
San Francisco	2	–	16	.111	7	–	24	.226
† 2019 WCC tournament winner As of March 23, 2019; Rankings from AP poll

The 2018–19 San Francisco Dons women's basketball team represented the University of San Francisco in the 2018–19 NCAA Division I women's basketball season. They were led by head coach Molly Goodenbour in her third season at San Francisco. The Dons, as members of the West Coast Conference (WCC), played their home games at War Memorial Gymnasium in San Francisco, California. They finished the season 7–24, 2–16 in WCC play, to finish in a tie for ninth place. They advanced to the second round of the WCC women's tournament, where they lost to Loyola Marymount.

== Roster ==
2018–19 San Francisco Dons women's basketball team
Players
Coaches

Pos.	#	Name	Height	Year	Previous school	Hometown
G	2	Kia Vaalavirta	5 ft 8 in (1.73 m)	Fr	Mäkelänrinteen Lukio	Espoo, Finland
G	3	Marta Galic	6 ft 0 in (1.83 m)	Fr	Sportska Gimnazija	Zagreb, Croatia
G	4	Marianna Klavina	5 ft 9 in (1.75 m)	Fr	Riga Secondary School No. 49	Riga, Latvia
G	5	Amalie Langer	5 ft 9 in (1.75 m)	Fr	Rungsted Gymnasium	Rungsted, Denmark
F	10	Marija Galic	6 ft 0 in (1.83 m)	Fr	Sportska Gimnazija	Zagreb, Croatia
C	11	Bec Black	6 ft 2 in (1.88 m)	So	Barker College	Coffs Harbour, Australia
F	12	Moa Lundqvist	6 ft 1 in (1.85 m)	Jr	BG LULEÅ; Odessa College	Östersund, Sweden
G	13	Nia Alexander	5 ft 9 in (1.75 m)	Jr	Todd Beamer	Federal Way, WA
G	23	Veronica Preciado	5 ft 9 in (1.75 m)	Sr	Grant Union; Eastern Arizona JC	Sacramento, CA
F	24	Lucija Kostic	6 ft 2 in (1.88 m)	Fr	Prirodoslovna škola Vladimira Preloga	Zagreb, Croatia
F	32	Julia Nielacna	6 ft 0 in (1.83 m)	Fr	Lomanki	Ostrów Wielkopolski, Poland
G	33	Shannon Powell	5 ft 6 in (1.68 m)	Sr	Bel Air; Cochise College	El Paso, TX
G/F	55	Abby Rathbun	5 ft 11 in (1.8 m)	Fr	Moses Lake	Moses Lake, WA

Head coach

- Molly Goodenbour (Stanford)

Assistant coach(es)

- Janell Jones (Oklahoma Christian)
- Katy Steding (Stanford)
- Arthur Moreira (Sonoma State)

Legend

- (C) Team captain
- (S) Suspended
- (I) Ineligible
- (W) Walk-on
- Injured
- Current redshirt

Roster
Last update: November 13, 2024

== Schedule and results ==
Date time, TV	Rank^{#}	Opponent^{#}	Result	Record	Site (attendance) city, state
Exhibition
October 27, 2018*; 4:00 p.m.		Chico State	W 71–59		War Memorial Gymnasium; San Francisco, CA
Non-conference regular season
November 9, 2018*; 7:00 p.m.		San Jose State	W 85–63	1–0	War Memorial Gymnasium (640); San Francisco, CA
November 15, 2018*; 7:00 p.m.		at No. 7 Stanford	L 62–96	1–1	Maples Pavilion (2,077); Stanford, CA
November 18, 2018*; 2:00 p.m.		Cal Poly	W 65–62	2–1	The Kelp Bed (64); Seaside, CA
November 23, 2018*; 2:00 p.m.		Northern Colorado	L 63–68	2–2	War Memorial Gymnasium (263); San Francisco, CA
November 25, 2018*; 2:00 p.m.		UT Arlington	L 73–80	2–3	War Memorial Gymnasium (235); San Francisco, CA
November 29, 2018*; 7:00 p.m.		at Washington State	L 61–91	2–4	Beasley Coliseum (577); Pullman, WA
December 1, 2018*; 2:00 p.m.		at Idaho	L 63–70	2–5	Memorial Gym (400); Moscow, ID
December 5, 2018*; 7:05 p.m.		at Sacramento State	W 86–75	3–5	Hornets Nest (336); Sacramento, CA
December 15, 2018*; 3:00 p.m.		UC Davis	L 68–70	3–6	War Memorial Gymnasium (432); San Francisco, CA
December 19, 2018*; 12:00 p.m.		vs. North Dakota State; Hatter Classic	W 75–42	4–6	Edmunds Center (105); DeLand, FL
December 21, 2018*; 10:00 a.m.		vs. North Dakota; Hatter Classic	L 97–100 ^{2OT}	4–7	Edmunds Center (150); DeLand, FL
WCC regular season
December 29, 2018; 2:00 p.m.		San Diego	W 68–57	5–7 (1–0)	War Memorial Gymnasium (257); San Francisco, CA
December 31, 2018; 3:00 p.m.		BYU	L 59–67	5–8 (1–1)	War Memorial Gymnasium (263); San Francisco, CA
January 5, 2019; 2:00 p.m.		Santa Clara	L 66–71 ^{OT}	5–9 (1–2)	War Memorial Gymnasium (268); San Francisco, CA
January 10, 2019; 7:00 p.m.		at Loyola Marymount	L 58–66	5–10 (1–3)	Gersten Pavilion (237); Los Angeles, CA
January 12, 2019; 2:00 p.m.		at Pepperdine	L 50–69	5–11 (1–4)	Firestone Fieldhouse; Malibu, CA
January 17, 2019; 7:00 p.m.		Saint Mary's	L 65–80	5–12 (1–5)	War Memorial Gymnasium (249); San Francisco, CA
January 19, 2019; 12:00 p.m.		Pacific	L 75–85	5–13 (1–6)	War Memorial Gymnasium (274); San Francisco, CA
January 24, 2019; 6:00 p.m.		at No. 18 Gonzaga	L 51–78	5–14 (1–7)	McCarthey Athletic Center (5,500); Spokane, WA
January 26, 2019; 2:00 p.m.		at Portland	L 73–78	5–15 (1–8)	Chiles Center (513); Portland, OR
February 2, 2019; 2:00 p.m.		at Santa Clara	W 57–49	6–15 (2–8)	Leavey Center (372); Santa Clara, CA
February 7, 2019; 7:00 p.m.		Pepperdine	L 66–72	6–16 (2–9)	War Memorial Gymnasium (457); San Francisco, CA
February 9, 2019; 12:00 p.m.		Loyola Marymount	L 56–73	6–17 (2–10)	War Memorial Gymnasium (322); San Francisco, CA
February 14, 2019; 7:00 p.m.		at Pacific	L 48–74	6–18 (2–11)	Alex G. Spanos Center (419); Stockton, CA
February 16, 2019; 1:00 p.m.		at Saint Mary's	L 63–88	6–19 (2–12)	McKeon Pavilion (375); Moraga, CA
February 21, 2019; 7:00 p.m.		Portland	L 66–69	6–20 (2–13)	War Memorial Gymnasium (381); San Francisco, CA
February 23, 2019; 2:00 p.m.		No. 15 Gonzaga	L 44–64	6–21 (2–14)	War Memorial Gymnasium (643); San Francisco, CA
February 28, 2019; 6:00 p.m.		at BYU	L 59–82	6–22 (2–15)	Marriott Center (556); Provo, UT
March 2, 2019; 2:00 p.m.		at San Diego	L 59–66	6–23 (2–16)	Jenny Craig Pavilion (353); San Diego, CA
WCC women's tournament
March 7, 2019; 12:00 p.m., BYUtv	(9)	vs. (8) Portland; First round	W 76–69	7–23	Orleans Arena (5,234); Paradise, NV
March 8, 2019; 12:00 p.m., BYUtv	(9)	vs. (5) Loyola Marymount; Second round	L 45–66	7–24	Orleans Arena (5,237); Paradise, NV
*Non-conference game. ^{#}Rankings from AP poll. (#) Tournament seedings in parentheses. All times are in Pacific.

== See also ==
- 2018–19 San Francisco Dons men's basketball team
