= 2018–19 Gonzaga Bulldogs women's basketball team =

Intercollegiate basketball season

2018–19 Gonzaga Bulldogs women's basketball

WCC regular season champions

NCAA tournament, second round
- Conference: West Coast Conference

Ranking
- Coaches: No. 18
- AP: No. 16
- Record: 29–5 (16–2 WCC)
- Head coach: Lisa Fortier (5th season)
- Assistant coaches: Jordan Green; Stacy Clinesmith; Craig Fortier
- Home arena: McCarthey Athletic Center

2018–19 West Coast Conference women's basketball standings
	Conf.				Overall
Team	W		L	PCT	W		L	PCT
No. 16 Gonzaga	16	–	2	.889	29	–	5	.853
BYU †	15	–	3	.833	26	–	7	.788
Pepperdine	12	–	6	.667	22	–	12	.647
Saint Mary's	12	–	6	.667	21	–	12	.636
Pacific	10	–	8	.556	19	–	13	.594
Loyola Marymount	10	–	8	.556	18	–	15	.545
Santa Clara	6	–	12	.333	14	–	17	.452
Portland	5	–	13	.278	13	–	17	.433
San Diego	2	–	16	.111	9	–	21	.300
San Francisco	2	–	16	.111	7	–	24	.226
† 2019 WCC tournament winner As of March 23, 2019; Rankings from AP poll

The 2018–19 Gonzaga Bulldogs women's basketball team represented Gonzaga University in the 2018–19 NCAA Division I women's basketball season. The Bulldogs (also informally referred to as the "Zags"), were members of the West Coast Conference. The Bulldogs, led by fifth year head coach Lisa Fortier, played their home games at the McCarthey Athletic Center on the university campus in Spokane, Washington. They finished the season 29–5, 16–2 in WCC play to win the WCC regular season. They advanced to the WCC women's basketball tournament, where they lost to BYU. They received at-large bid to the NCAA women's tournament, where they defeated Little Rock in the first round before losing to Oregon State.

== Roster ==
2018–19 Gonzaga Bulldogs women's basketball team
Players
Coaches

Pos.	#	Name	Height	Year	Previous school	Hometown
F	0	Zykera Rice	6 ft 1 in (1.85 m)	Sr	Clover Park	Tacoma, WA
F	1	Anamaria Virjoghe (redshirt)	6 ft 5 in (1.96 m)	So	Voievodul Mercea; Northwest Christian	Târgoviște, Romania
F	3	Jenn Wirth	6 ft 3 in (1.91 m)	So	Seton Catholic	Chandler, AZ
F	4	LeeAnne Wirth	6 ft 3 in (1.91 m)	So	Seton Catholic	Chandler, AZ
G	5	Louise Forsyth	6 ft 0 in (1.83 m)	So	Brookswood Secondary	Langley, BC
F	10	Gillian Barfield	6 ft 1 in (1.85 m)	So	Phoenix Country Day School	Phoenix, AZ
G	11	Laura Stockton	5 ft 8 in (1.73 m)	Sr	Gonzaga Prep	Spokane, WA
G	15	Jessie Loera	5 ft 6 in (1.68 m)	Jr	Moses Lake	Moses Lake, WA
G	24	Katie Campbell	5 ft 10 in (1.78 m)	Jr	Ventura; Ventura College	Oxnard, CA
G	30	Chandler Smith	6 ft 0 in (1.83 m)	RS Sr	Brewster; Nebraska	Brewster, WA
G	32	Jill Townsend	5 ft 11 in (1.8 m)	So	Okanogan	Okanogan, WA
F	33	Melody Kempton	6 ft 1 in (1.85 m)	Fr	Post Falls	Post Falls, ID
G	44	Kylee Griffen (redshirt)	6 ft 2 in (1.88 m)	Fr	Lake Stevens	Marysville, WA

Head coach

- Lisa Fortier (Cal State Monterey)

Assistant coach(es)

- Jordan Green (George Fox)
- Stacy Clinesmith (UC Santa Barbara)
- Craig Fortier (Cal State Monterey)

Legend

- (C) Team captain
- (S) Suspended
- (I) Ineligible
- (W) Walk-on
- Injured
- Current redshirt

Roster

== Schedule ==
Date time, TV	Rank^{#}	Opponent^{#}	Result	Record	Site (attendance) city, state
Exhibition
Nov 2, 2018*; 6:00 pm		Carroll (MT)	W 86–43		McCarthey Athletic Center (5,370); Spokane, WA
Non-conference regular season
Nov 7, 2018*; 6:00 pm, SWX		Montana	W 76–52	1–0	McCarthey Athletic Center (5,472); Spokane, WA
Nov 11, 2018*; 2:00 pm, SWX		at Eastern Washington	W 63–51	2–0	Reese Court (1,472); Cheney, WA
Nov 13, 2018*; 6:00 pm		Idaho State	W 70–51	3–0	McCarthey Athletic Center (5,019); Spokane, WA
Nov 17, 2018*; 3:00 pm		at UNLV	W 70–59	4–0	Cox Pavilion (1,373); Paradise, NV
Nov 22, 2018*; 12:00 pm		vs. No. 1 Notre Dame; Vancouver Showcase Quarterfinals	L 65–81	4–1	Vancouver Convention Centre (1,018); Vancouver, BC
Nov 23, 2018*; 12:00 pm		vs. Rutgers; Vancouver Showcase Consolation 2nd round	W 57–40	5–1	Vancouver Convention Centre (1,022); Vancouver, BC
Nov 24, 2018*; 1:30 pm		vs. Western Kentucky; Vancouver Showcase 5th place game	W 76–55	6–1	Vancouver Convention Centre (722); Vancouver, BC
Nov 28, 2018*; 6:00 pm		Colorado State	W 50–39	7–1	McCarthey Athletic Center (5,065); Spokane, WA
Dec 2, 2018*; 2:00 pm, SWX		No. 8 Stanford	W 79–73	8–1	McCarthey Athletic Center (6,000); Spokane, WA
Dec 9, 2018*; 2:00 pm, SWX	No. 24	Washington State	W 76–53	9–1	McCarthey Athletic Center (5,571); Spokane, WA
Dec 16, 2018*; 12:00 pm	No. 21	at Missouri State	W 70–67	10–1	JQH Arena (2,066); Springfield, MO
Dec 20, 2018*; 6:00 pm	No. 21	Idaho	W 88–51	11–1	McCarthey Athletic Center (5,795); Spokane, WA
WCC regular season
Dec 29, 2018; 2:00 pm	No. 20	at Loyola Marymount	W 78–53	12–1 (1–0)	Gersten Pavilion (381); Los Angeles, CA
Dec 31, 2018; 12:00 pm	No. 17	at Pepperdine	W 79–54	13–1 (2–0)	Firestone Fieldhouse; Malibu, CA
Jan 3, 2019; 6:00 pm	No. 17	Saint Mary's	W 74–62	14–1 (3–0)	McCarthey Athletic Center (5,861); Spokane, WA
Jan 5, 2019; 12:00 pm	No. 17	Pacific	W 88–65	15–1 (4–0)	McCarthey Athletic Center (5,807); Spokane, WA
Jan 12, 2019; 2:00 pm, SWX	No. 14	Portland	W 97–71	16–1 (5–0)	McCarthey Athletic Center (5,697); Spokane, WA
Jan 17, 2019; 6:00 pm, BYUtv	No. 13	at BYU	L 68–70	16–2 (5–1)	Marriott Center (1,341); Provo, UT
Jan 19, 2019; 2:00 pm	No. 13	at San Diego	W 86–61	17–2 (6–1)	Jenny Craig Pavilion (457); San Diego, CA
Jan 24, 2019; 6:00 pm	No. 18	San Francisco	W 78–51	18–2 (7–1)	McCarthey Athletic Center (5,500); Spokane, WA
Jan 26, 2019; 2:00 pm, SWX	No. 18	Santa Clara	W 78–61	19–2 (8–1)	McCarthey Athletic Center (6,000); Spokane, WA
Jan 31, 2019; 7:00 pm	No. 15	at Pacific	W 63–51	20–2 (9–1)	Alex G. Spanos Center (551); Stockton, CA
Feb 2, 2019; 6:00 pm	No. 15	at Saint Mary's	W 66–52	21–2 (10–1)	McKeon Pavilion (480); Moraga, CA
Feb 9, 2019; 4:30 pm	No. 13	at Portland	W 93–62	22–2 (11–1)	Chiles Center (543); Portland, OR
Feb 14, 2019; 6:00 pm	No. 13	San Diego	W 71–44	23–2 (12–1)	McCarthey Athletic Center (5,304); Spokane, WA
Feb 16, 2019; 2:00 pm, SWX	No. 13	BYU	L 64–66	23–3 (12–2)	McCarthey Athletic Center (6,000); Spokane, WA
Feb 21, 2019; 7:00 pm	No. 15	at Santa Clara	W 74–61	24–3 (13–2)	Leavey Center (394); Santa Clara, CA
Feb 23, 2019; 2:00 pm	No. 15	at San Francisco	W 64–44	25–3 (14–2)	War Memorial Gymnasium (643); San Francisco, CA
Feb 28, 2018; 6:00 pm	No. 16	Pepperdine	W 83–60	26–3 (15–2)	McCarthey Athletic Center (5,277); Spokane, WA
Mar 2, 2018; 2:00 pm	No. 16	Loyola Marymount	W 68–58	27–3 (16–2)	McCarthey Athletic Center (6,000); Spokane, WA
WCC Women's Tournament
Mar 11, 2019; 12:00 pm, BYUtv	(1) No. 12	vs. (4) Saint Mary's; Semifinals	W 78–77 ^{2OT}	28–3	Orleans Arena (5,511); Paradise, NV
Mar 12, 2019; 1:00 pm, ESPNU	(1) No. 12	vs. (2) BYU; Championship Game	L 68–82	28–4	Orleans Arena (5,892); Paradise, NV
NCAA Women's Tournament
Mar 23, 2019*; 12:30 pm, ESPN2	(5 A) No. 16	vs. (12 A) Little Rock; First Round	W 68–51	29–4	Gill Coliseum; Corvallis, OR
Mar 25, 2019*; 6:00 pm, ESPN	(5 A) No. 16	at (4 A) No. 11 Oregon State; Second Round	L 70–76	29–5	Gill Coliseum (5,478); Corvallis, OR
*Non-conference game. ^{#}Rankings from AP Poll. (#) Tournament seedings in parentheses. A=Albany Region. All times are in Pacific Time.

== Rankings ==
2018–19 NCAA Division I women's basketball rankings

Regular season polls
Poll	Pre- Season	Week 2	Week 3	Week 4	Week 5	Week 6	Week 7	Week 8	Week 9	Week 10	Week 11	Week 12	Week 13	Week 14	Week 15	Week 16	Week 17	Week 18	Week 19	Final
AP					24	21	21	20	17	14	13	18	15	13	13	15	16	14	12	N/A
Coaches	RV	RV^	RV	RV	23	21	21	21	18	15	14	17	13	12	12	16	14	12	11	18

Legend
	Increase in ranking
	Decrease in ranking
	No change
(RV)	Received votes
(NR)	Not ranked

^Coaches did not release a Week 2 poll.

== See also ==
- 2018–19 Gonzaga Bulldogs men's basketball team
