= 2018–19 Pepperdine Waves women's basketball team =

Intercollegiate basketball season

2018–19 Pepperdine Waves women's basketball

WNIT, Sweet Sixteen
- Conference: West Coast Conference
- Record: 22–11 (12–6 WCC)
- Head coach: DeLisha Milton-Jones (2nd season)
- Assistant coaches: Josh Pace; Shelley Wong
- Home arena: Firestone Fieldhouse

2018–19 West Coast Conference women's basketball standings
	Conf.				Overall
Team	W		L	PCT	W		L	PCT
No. 16 Gonzaga	16	–	2	.889	29	–	5	.853
BYU †	15	–	3	.833	26	–	7	.788
Pepperdine	12	–	6	.667	22	–	12	.647
Saint Mary's	12	–	6	.667	21	–	12	.636
Pacific	10	–	8	.556	19	–	13	.594
Loyola Marymount	10	–	8	.556	18	–	15	.545
Santa Clara	6	–	12	.333	14	–	17	.452
Portland	5	–	13	.278	13	–	17	.433
San Diego	2	–	16	.111	9	–	21	.300
San Francisco	2	–	16	.111	7	–	24	.226
† 2019 WCC tournament winner As of March 23, 2019; Rankings from AP poll

The 2018–19 Pepperdine Waves women's basketball team represented Pepperdine University in the 2018–19 NCAA Division I women's basketball season. The Waves, as members of the West Coast Conference, were led by second year head coach DeLisha Milton-Jones. The Waves played their home games at the Firestone Fieldhouse on the university campus in Malibu, California. They finished the season 22–12, 12–6 in WCC play to finish in a tie for third place. They advanced to the semifinals of the WCC women's tournament, where they lost to Gonzaga. They received an automatic bid to the Women's National Invitation Tournament, where they defeated California Baptist and WCC member Saint Mary's in the second round before losing to Wyoming in the third round.

== Roster ==
2018–19 Pepperdine Waves women's basketball team
Players
Coaches

Pos.	#	Name	Height	Year	Previous school	Hometown
G	1	Malia Banbrick	5 ft 10 in (1.78 m)	Fr	Bishop Alemany	Santa Clarita, CA
G	2	Rose Pflug	5 ft 11 in (1.8 m)	So	Sunset	Portland, OR
G	3	Jayda Ruffus-Milner	5 ft 10 in (1.78 m)	Fr	Harvard-Westlake	North Hills, CA
C	5	Megan House	6 ft 4 in (1.93 m)	RS Jr	Serra	Oceanside, CA
G	10	Paige Fescke	5 ft 4 in (1.63 m)	Sr	Chaminade	Studio City, CA
F	11	Monique Andriuolo	6 ft 1 in (1.85 m)	So	Maribyrnong Secondary	Melbourne, Australia
G	14	Jayla Ruffus-Milner	5 ft 10 in (1.78 m)	Fr	Harvard-Westlake	North Hills, CA
G	15	Keyari Sleezer	5 ft 11 in (1.8 m)	Sr	South Medford	Medford, OR
G	22	Deezha Battle	5 ft 6 in (1.68 m)	Jr	Volcano Vista; Cochise College	Albuquerque, NM
G	23	Barbara Sitanggan	5 ft 6 in (1.68 m)	Jr	Troy HS	Fullerton, CA
F	24	Skye Lindsay	6 ft 2 in (1.88 m)	Fr	Mountview View	Orem, UT
F	25	Yasmine Robinson-Bacote	5 ft 11 in (1.8 m)	Sr	Hillside	Hillside, NJ
G	32	Mia Satie	5 ft 10 in (1.78 m)	So	Iona Presentation	Perth, Australia

Head coach

- DeLisha Milton-Jones (Florida)

Assistant coach(es)

- Josh Pace (Syracuse)
- Shelley Wong (Colorado College)

Legend

- (C) Team captain
- (S) Suspended
- (I) Ineligible
- (W) Walk-on
- Injured
- Current redshirt

Roster

== Schedule ==
Date time, TV	Rank^{#}	Opponent^{#}	Result	Record	Site (attendance) city, state
Regular season
Nov 6, 2018*; 9:00 pm, SPEC HI		at Hawaii	W 65–64	1–0	Stan Sheriff Center (1,205); Honolulu, HI
Nov 16, 2018*; 7:00 pm		UC Irvine	Postponed		Firestone Fieldhouse; Malibu, CA
Nov 23, 2018*; 4:05 pm		vs. Sacramento State; ShareSLO Holiday Beach Classic	W 113–97	2–0	Mott Athletics Center (189); San Luis Obispo, CA
Nov 24, 2018*; 4:30 pm		at Cal Poly; ShareSLO Holiday Beach Classic	W 70–63	3–0	Mott Athletics Center; San Luis Obispo, CA
Nov 27, 2018*; 6:00 pm		at Colorado	L 65–80	3–1	CU Events Center (1,319); Boulder, CO
Dec 2, 2018*; 2:00 pm		at Seattle	W 77–64	4–1	Redhawk Center (278); Seattle, WA
Dec 5, 2018*; 7:00 pm		Weber State	W 68–47	5–1	Firestone Fieldhouse (437); Malibu, CA
Dec 8, 2018*; 1:00 pm		at Idaho State	L 63–65	5–2	Reed Gym (828); Pocatello, ID
Dec 19, 2018*; 1:30 pm		at Providence; Friar Holiday Classic	L 47–66	5–3	Alumni Hall (231); Providence, RI
Dec 20, 2018*; 4:00 pm		vs. La Salle; Friar Holiday Classic	L 55–62	5–4	Alumni Hall (112); Providence, RI
Dec 21, 2018*; 9:00 am		vs. Northern Kentucky; Friar Holiday Classic	W 51–46	6–4	Alumni Hall (146); Providence, RI
Dec 29, 2018; 2:00 pm		Portland	W 82–68	7–4 (1–0)	Firestone Fieldhouse; Malibu, CA
Dec 31, 2018; 12:00 pm		No. 17 Gonzaga	L 54–79	7–5 (0–1)	Firestone Fieldhouse; Malibu, CA
Jan 3, 2019; 6:00 pm, BYUtv		at BYU	L 58–83	7–6 (1–2)	Marriott Center (679); Provo, UT
Jan 5, 2019; 2:00 pm		at San Diego	W 74–55	8–6 (2–2)	Jenny Craig Pavilion (315); San Diego, CA
Jan 10, 2019; 7:00 pm		Santa Clara	W 74–48	9–6 (3–2)	Firestone Fieldhouse; Malibu, CA
Jan 12, 2019; 2:00 pm		San Francisco	W 69–50	10–6 (4–2)	Firestone Fieldhouse; Malibu, CA
Jan 19, 2019; 2:00 pm		Loyola Marymount	W 95–86 ^{OT}	11–6 (5–2)	Firestone Fieldhouse (400); Malibu, CA
Jan 24, 2019; 6:30 pm		at Saint Mary's	L 68–79	11–7 (5–3)	McKeon Pavilion (268); Moraga, CA
Jan 26, 2019; 4:00 pm		at Pacific	L 67–78	11–8 (5–4)	Alex G. Spanos Center (2,217); Stockton, CA
Jan 31, 2019; 7:00 pm		San Diego	W 88–65	12–8 (6–4)	Firestone Fieldhouse; Malibu, CA
Feb 2, 2019; 2:00 pm		No. 25 BYU	W 79–65	13–8 (7–4)	Firestone Fieldhouse; Malibu, CA
Feb 7, 2019; 7:00 pm		at San Francisco	W 72–66	14–8 (8–4)	War Memorial Gymnasium (457); San Francisco, CA
Feb 9, 2019; 2:00 pm		at Santa Clara	W 76–74	15–8 (9–4)	Leavey Center (1,216); Santa Clara, CA
Feb 12, 2018*; 7:00 pm		Cal State Los Angeles	W 80–56	16–8	Firestone Fieldhouse (200); Malibu, CA
Feb 15, 2019; 7:00 pm		at Loyola Marymount	W 73–55	17–8 (10–4)	Gersten Pavilion (357); Los Angeles, CA
Feb 21, 2019; 7:00 pm		Pacific	W 96–76	18–8 (11–4)	Firestone Fieldhouse (236); Malibu, CA
Feb 23, 2019; 2:00 pm		Saint Mary's	W 77–72	19–8 (12–4)	Firestone Fieldhouse (335); Malibu, CA
Feb 28, 2018; 6:00 pm		at Gonzaga	L 60–83	19–9 (12–5)	McCarthey Athletic Center (5,277); Spokane, WA
Mar 2, 2018; 4:30 pm		at Portland	L 63–85	19–10 (12–5)	Chiles Center (431); Portland, OR
WCC Women's Tournament
Mar 9, 2019; 3:00 pm, BYUtv	(3)	vs. (6) Pacific; Quarterfinals	W 87–84	20–10	Orleans Arena (5,339); Paradise, NV
Mar 11, 2019; 1:00 pm, BYUtv	(6)	vs. (2) BYU; Semifinals	L 63–68	20–11	Orleans Arena (5,511); Paradise, NV
WNIT
Mar 20, 2019*; 5:00 pm		at California Baptist; First Round	W 91–79	21–11	CBU Events Center (833); Riverside, CA
Mar 24, 2019*; 5:00 pm		at Saint Mary's; Second Round	W 65–61	22–11	McKeon Pavilion (325); Moraga, CA
Mar 28, 2019*; 5:30 pm		at Wyoming; Third Round	L 60–61	22–12	Arena-Auditorium (5,134); Laramie, WY
*Non-conference game. ^{#}Rankings from AP Poll. (#) Tournament seedings in parentheses. All times are in Pacific Time.

== See also ==
- 2018–19 Pepperdine Waves men's basketball team
