= 2019 West Coast Conference women's basketball tournament =

- Classification: Division I
- Season: 2018–19
- Teams: 10
- Finals site: Orleans Arena; Paradise, Nevada
- Champions: BYU (3rd title)
- Winning coach: Jeff Judkins (3rd title)
- MVP: Paisley Johnson (BYU)
- Attendance: 27,213
- Television: ESPNU/BYUtv

2018–19 West Coast Conference women's basketball standings
| | Conf. | | | | Overall |
| Team | W | | L | PCT | W | | L | PCT |
|---|---|---|---|---|---|---|---|---|
| No. 16 Gonzaga | 16 | – | 2 | .889 | 29 | – | 5 | .853 |
| BYU † | 15 | – | 3 | .833 | 26 | – | 7 | .788 |
| Pepperdine | 12 | – | 6 | .667 | 22 | – | 12 | .647 |
| Saint Mary's | 12 | – | 6 | .667 | 21 | – | 12 | .636 |
| Pacific | 10 | – | 8 | .556 | 19 | – | 13 | .594 |
| Loyola Marymount | 10 | – | 8 | .556 | 18 | – | 15 | .545 |
| Santa Clara | 6 | – | 12 | .333 | 14 | – | 17 | .452 |
| Portland | 5 | – | 13 | .278 | 13 | – | 17 | .433 |
| San Diego | 2 | – | 16 | .111 | 9 | – | 21 | .300 |
| San Francisco | 2 | – | 16 | .111 | 7 | – | 24 | .226 |
† 2019 WCC tournament winner As of March 23, 2019; Rankings from AP poll

The 2019 University Credit Union West Coast Conference women's basketball tournament was a postseason women's basketball tournament held for the West Coast Conference for the 2018–19 season. All tournament games were played at the Orleans Arena in the Las Vegas area community of Paradise, Nevada from March 7–12, 2019. BYU won the championship game over Gonzaga. Paisley Johnson was named the tournament's Most Outstanding Player.

== Seeds ==
All 10 WCC schools will participate in the tournament. Teams will be seeded by conference record, with the following tiebreaker system used to seed teams with identical conference records:

- Head-to-head record.
- Record against the top team in the conference not involved in the tie, going down through the standings as necessary to break the tie. Should more than one team be tied for a position in the standings, collective records against all teams involved in that tie are considered.
- RPI at the end of the conference season.

The tournament will return to a format similar to that used from 2003 to 2011, with slight changes to the terminology used for the rounds prior to the semifinals. The 7 through 10 seeds will play in what is now called the "opening round", the 5 and 6 seeds will start play in the "second round", and the 3 and 4 seeds will start in the "third round". The top two seeds will receive byes into the semifinals.

| Seed | School | Conference | Overall* | Tiebreaker |
|---|---|---|---|---|
| 1 | Gonzaga | 16–2 | 27–3 | |
| 2 | BYU | 15–3 | 23–6 | |
| 3 | Pepperdine | 12–6 | 19–10 | 1–1 vs SMC, 0–2 vs GU, 1–1 vs BYU, 2–0 vs LMU |
| 4 | Saint Mary's | 12–6 | 19–10 | 1–1 vs Pep, 0–2 vs GU, 1–1 vs BYU, 1–1 vs LMU |
| 5 | Loyola Marymount | 10–8 | 17–13 | 1–1 vs. UOP, 1–1 vs. BYU |
| 6 | Pacific | 10–8 | 17–11 | 1–1 vs. LMU, 0–2 vs. BYU |
| 7 | Santa Clara | 6–12 | 13–16 | |
| 8 | Portland | 5–13 | 13–16 | |
| 9 | San Francisco | 2–16 | 6–23 | 1–1 vs. San Diego & Santa Clara, Higher RPI (239) |
| 10 | San Diego | 2–16 | 9–20 | 1–1 vs. San Francisco & Santa Clara, Lower RPI (266) |

* Overall record at end of regular season.

== Schedule ==
| Session | Game | Time* | Matchup^{#} | Television | Attendance |
First round – Thursday March 7, 2019
| 1 | 1 | 12:00 PM | #8 Portland vs. #9 San Francisco | BYUtv | 5,234 |
| 1 | 2 | 2:00 PM | #7 Santa Clara vs. #10 San Diego | BYUtv | 5,234 |
Second round – Friday March 8, 2019
| 2 | 3 | 12:00 PM | #5 Loyola Marymount vs. #9 San Francisco | BYUtv | 5,237 |
| 2 | 4 | 2:00 PM | #6 Pacific vs. #7 Santa Clara | BYUtv | 5,237 |
Quarterfinals – Saturday, March 9, 2018
| 3 | 5 | 1:00 PM | #4 Saint Mary's vs #5 Loyola Marymount | BYUtv | 5,339 |
| 3 | 6 | 3:00 PM | #3 Pepperdine vs #6 Pacific | BYUtv | 5,339 |
Semifinals – Monday, March 11, 2018
| 4 | 7 | 12:00 PM | #1 Gonzaga vs #4 Saint Mary's | BYUtv | 5,511 |
| 4 | 8 | 2:00 PM | #2 BYU vs #3 Pepperdine | BYUtv | 5,511 |
Championship – Tuesday, March 12, 2019
| 5 | 9 | 1:00 PM | #1 Gonzaga vs. #2 BYU | ESPNU | 5,892 |
*Game times in PT. #-Rankings denote tournament seeding.

== Bracket and scores ==
- All games except the championship will air on BYUtv games and be simulcast on TheW.tv. The championship will air on ESPNU.

Opening round Thursday, March 7
8 | Portland | 69
9 | San Francisco | 76
7 | Santa Clara | 63
10 | San Diego | 59

Second round Friday, March 8
5 | Loyola Marymount | 66
9 | San Francisco | 45
6 | Pacific | 76
7 | Santa Clara | 60

Third round Saturday, March 9
4 | Saint Mary's | 70
5 | Loyola Marymount | 38
3 | Pepperdine | 87
6 | Pacific | 84

Semifinals; Monday, March 11
1 | Gonzaga | 78 2OT
4 | Saint Mary's | 77
2 | BYU | 67
3 | Pepperdine | 63

Championship; Tuesday, March 12
1 | Gonzaga | 68
2 | BYU | 82

== See also ==
- 2018–19 NCAA Division I women's basketball season
- West Coast Conference men's basketball tournament
- 2019 West Coast Conference men's basketball tournament
- West Coast Conference women's basketball tournament
