= 2018–19 San Diego Toreros women's basketball team =

Intercollegiate basketball season

2018–19 San Diego Toreros women's basketball
- Conference: West Coast Conference
- Record: 9–21 (2–16 WCC)
- Head coach: Cindy Fisher (14th season)
- Assistant coaches: Mary Ann Falcosky; Mery Andrade; Trevor Olson
- Home arena: Jenny Craig Pavilion

2018–19 West Coast Conference women's basketball standings
	Conf.				Overall
Team	W		L	PCT	W		L	PCT
No. 16 Gonzaga	16	–	2	.889	29	–	5	.853
BYU †	15	–	3	.833	26	–	7	.788
Pepperdine	12	–	6	.667	22	–	12	.647
Saint Mary's	12	–	6	.667	21	–	12	.636
Pacific	10	–	8	.556	19	–	13	.594
Loyola Marymount	10	–	8	.556	18	–	15	.545
Santa Clara	6	–	12	.333	14	–	17	.452
Portland	5	–	13	.278	13	–	17	.433
San Diego	2	–	16	.111	9	–	21	.300
San Francisco	2	–	16	.111	7	–	24	.226
† 2019 WCC tournament winner As of March 23, 2019; Rankings from AP poll

The 2018–19 San Diego Toreros women's basketball team represented the University of San Diego in the 2018–19 college basketball season. The Toreros, as members of the West Coast Conference, were led by fourteenth year head coach Cindy Fisher. The Toreros played their home games at the Jenny Craig Pavilion on the university campus in San Diego, California. They finished the season 9–21, 2–16 in WCC play to finish in a tie for ninth place. They lost in the first round of the WCC women's tournament to Santa Clara.

== Roster ==
2018–19 San Diego Toreros women's basketball team
Players
Coaches

Pos.	#	Name	Height	Year	Previous school	Hometown
G	0	Kiera Oakry	5 ft 10 in (1.78 m)	Fr	La Jolla Country Day	San Diego, CA
G	2	Aminata Dosso	5 ft 9 in (1.75 m)	Fr	Bishop Alemany	Paris, France
G	4	Ana Ramos	5 ft 10 in (1.78 m)	Jr	Escola Basica e Secundaria Amelia Rey Colaco	Porto, Portugal
G	10	Myah Pace	5 ft 11 in (1.8 m)	So	Bishop O'Dowd	Oakland, CA
G	11	Madison Pollock	6 ft 1 in (1.85 m)	Jr	Archbishop Murphy	Snohomish
G	14	Karla Martínez	5 ft 9 in (1.75 m)	Fr		Zacatecas, Mexico
C	15	Leticia Soares	6 ft 1 in (1.85 m)	Jr		Rio de Janeiro, Brazil
G	21	Sydney Shepard	5 ft 11 in (1.8 m)	Sr	Lake Washington	Kirkland, WA
G	23	Jordyn Edwards	5 ft 8 in (1.73 m)	RS So	Lynnwood	Lynnwood, WA
F	25	Nicole Blakes	6 ft 2 in (1.88 m)	Fr	Archbishop Mitty	Sunnyvale, CA
F	30	Kendall Bird	6 ft 2 in (1.88 m)	So	White River	Buckley, WA
G	32	Sydney Hunter	6 ft 0 in (1.83 m)	So	McNary	Keizer, OR
C	33	Kat Olczak	6 ft 7 in (2.01 m)	Jr	Zespol Szkol Mistrzostwa Sportowego	Zielona Góra, Poland
F	34	Patricia Brossman	6 ft 0 in (1.83 m)	Jr	TuS Lichterfelde	Berlin, Germany

Head coach

- Cindy Fisher (Eastern Wyoming College)

Assistant coach(es)

- Mary Ann Falcosky (Northern Arizona)
- Mery Andrade (Old Dominion)
- Trevor Olson (San Diego)

Legend

- (C) Team captain
- (S) Suspended
- (I) Ineligible
- (W) Walk-on
- Injured
- Current redshirt

Roster

== Schedule ==
Date time, TV	Rank^{#}	Opponent^{#}	Result	Record	Site (attendance) city, state
Exhibition
Nov 3, 2018*; 2:00 pm		Cal State San Marcos	W 64–55		Jenny Craig Pavilion; San Diego, CA
Non-conference regular season
Nov 7, 2018*; 5:30 pm		at Southern Utah	L 59–69	0–1	America First Events Center (784); Cedar City, UT
Nov 11, 2018*; 2:00 pm		Hawaii	W 58–50	1–1	Jenny Craig Pavilion (358); San Diego, CA
Nov 17, 2018*; 5:30 pm		at No. 25 Minnesota	L 48–53	1–2	Williams Arena (3,007); Minneapolis, MN
Nov 23, 2018*; 2:00 pm		Cleveland State; USD Thanksgiving Tournament	W 83–82	2–2	Jenny Craig Pavilion; San Diego, CA
Nov 24, 2018*; 4:00 pm		No. 18 California; USD Thanksgiving Tournament	L 53–70	2–3	Jenny Craig Pavilion; San Diego, CA
Nov 28, 2018*; 6:00 pm		San Diego State; City Championship	W 72–71	3–3	Jenny Craig Pavilion (423); San Diego, CA
Dec 1, 2018*; 2:00 pm		Dartmouth	W 78–76	4–3	Jenny Craig Pavilion (351); San Diego, CA
Dec 6, 2018*; 7:00 pm		at Long Beach State	W 60–56	5–3	Walter Pyramid (354); Long Beach, CA
Dec 10, 2018*; 5:00 pm		Cal State San Bernardino	W 76–58	6–3	Jenny Craig Pavilion (261); San Diego, CA
Dec 15, 2018*; 12:00 pm		at UTSA	L 67–77	6–4	Convocation Center (451); San Antonio, TX
Dec 21, 2018*; 5:00 pm		San Jose State	W 83–79	7–4	Jenny Craig Pavilion (321); San Diego, CA
WCC regular season
Dec 29, 2018; 2:00 pm		at San Francisco	L 57–68	7–5 (0–1)	War Memorial Gymnasium (257); San Francisco, CA
Dec 31, 2018; 2:00 pm		at Santa Clara	W 57–49	8–5 (1–1)	Leavey Center (317); Santa Clara, CA
Jan 3, 2019; 6:00 pm		Loyola Marymount	L 52–69	8–6 (1–2)	Jenny Craig Pavilion (233); San Diego, CA
Jan 5, 2019; 2:00 pm		Pepperdine	L 55–74	8–7 (1–3)	Jenny Craig Pavilion (315); San Diego, CA
Jan 10, 2019; 6:30 pm		at Saint Mary's	L 60–74	8–8 (1–4)	McKeon Pavilion (416); Moraga, CA
Jan 12, 2019; 2:00 pm		at Pacific	L 47–79	8–9 (1–5)	Alex G. Spanos Center (409); Stockton, CA
Jan 17, 2019; 12:00 pm		Portland	L 60–69	8–10 (1–6)	Jenny Craig Pavilion (521); San Diego, CA
Jan 19, 2019; 2:00 pm		No. 13 Gonzaga	L 61–86	8–11 (1–7)	Jenny Craig Pavilion (457); San Diego, CA
Jan 26, 2019; 2:00 pm		BYU	L 56–65	8–12 (1–8)	Jenny Craig Pavilion (433); San Diego, CA
Jan 31, 2019; 7:00 pm		at Pepperdine	L 65–88	8–13 (1–9)	Firestone Fieldhouse; Malibu, CA
Feb 2, 2019; 2:00 pm		at Loyola Marymount	L 57–83	8–14 (1–10)	Gersten Pavilion (534); Los Angeles, CA
Feb 7, 2019; 6:00 pm		Pacific	L 53–70	8–15 (1–11)	Jenny Craig Pavilion (377); San Diego, CA
Feb 9, 2019; 2:00 pm		Saint Mary's	L 49–80	8–16 (1–12)	Jenny Craig Pavilion (351); San Diego, CA
Feb 14, 2019; 6:00 pm		at No. 13 Gonzaga	L 44–71	8–17 (1–13)	McCarthey Athletic Center (5,304); Spokane, WA
Feb 16, 2019; 4:00 pm		at Portland	L 74–96	8–18 (1–14)	Chiles Center (323); Portland, OR
Feb 23, 2019; 1:00 pm, BYUtv		at BYU	L 68–80	8–19 (1–15)	Marriott Center (1,225); Provo, UT
Feb 28, 2019; 6:00 pm		Santa Clara	L 68–77	8–20 (1–16)	Jenny Craig Pavilion (327); San Diego, CA
Mar 2, 2019; 2:00 pm		San Francisco	W 66–59	9–20 (2–16)	Jenny Craig Pavilion (353); San Diego, CA
WCC Women's Tournament
Mar 7, 2019; 2:00 pm, BYUtv	(10)	vs. (7) Santa Clara; First Round	L 59–63	9–21	Orleans Arena (5,234); Paradise, NV
*Non-conference game. ^{#}Rankings from AP Poll. (#) Tournament seedings in parentheses. All times are in Pacific Time.

== Rankings ==
2018–19 NCAA Division I women's basketball rankings

+ Regular season polls	Poll	Pre- Season	Week 2	Week 3	Week 4	Week 5	Week 6	Week 7	Week 8	Week 9	Week 10	Week 11	Week 12	Week 13	Week 14	Week 15	Week 16	Week 17	Week 18	Week 19	Final
AP																				N/A	
Coaches																					

Legend
	Increase in ranking
	Decrease in ranking
	No change
(RV)	Received votes
(NR)	Not ranked

== See also ==
2018–19 San Diego Toreros men's basketball team
