= 2018–19 Loyola Marymount Lions women's basketball team =

Intercollegiate basketball season

2018–19 Loyola Marymount Lions women's basketball

WNIT, First Round
- Conference: West Coast Conference
- Record: 18–15 (10–8 WCC)
- Head coach: Charity Elliott (7th season)
- Assistant coaches: Chris Elliott; Jhasmin Player; Jasmin Holliday
- Home arena: Gersten Pavilion

2018–19 West Coast Conference women's basketball standings
	Conf.				Overall
Team	W		L	PCT	W		L	PCT
No. 16 Gonzaga	16	–	2	.889	29	–	5	.853
BYU †	15	–	3	.833	26	–	7	.788
Pepperdine	12	–	6	.667	22	–	12	.647
Saint Mary's	12	–	6	.667	21	–	12	.636
Pacific	10	–	8	.556	19	–	13	.594
Loyola Marymount	10	–	8	.556	18	–	15	.545
Santa Clara	6	–	12	.333	14	–	17	.452
Portland	5	–	13	.278	13	–	17	.433
San Diego	2	–	16	.111	9	–	21	.300
San Francisco	2	–	16	.111	7	–	24	.226
† 2019 WCC tournament winner As of March 23, 2019; Rankings from AP poll

The 2018–19 Loyola Marymount Lions women's basketball team represented Loyola Marymount University in the 2018–19 NCAA Division I women's basketball season. The Lions, led by seventh year head coach Charity Elliott, played their homes games at the Gersten Pavilion and were members of the West Coast Conference. They finished the season 18–15, 10–8 in WCC play to finish in a tie for fifth place. They advanced to the quarterfinals of the WCC women's tournament, where they lost to Saint Mary's. They received an at-large bid to the WNIT, where was their first postseason tournament since 2004, where they lost to Idaho in the first round.

== Roster ==
2018–19 Loyola Marymount Lions women's basketball team
Players
Coaches

Pos.	#	Name	Height	Year	Previous school	Hometown
G	1	Bianca Velasco	5 ft 8 in (1.73 m)	Sr	Mater Dei	Santa Ana, CA
G	2	Haley Herdman	—	Fr	Mira Costa	Manhattan Beach, CA
G	3	Chelsey Gipson	5 ft 7 in (1.7 m)	So	Palisades	Los Angeles, CA
G/F	4	Naomi Yim	—	Fr	Norco	Norco, CA
G	11	Andee Velasco	5 ft 8 in (1.73 m)	Sr	Mater Dei	Santa Ana, CA
F	20	Jasmine Jones	5 ft 10 in (1.78 m)	So	Long Beach Polytechnic	Signal Hill, CA
C	22	Raychel Stanley	6 ft 2 in (1.88 m)	Jr	Bishop Gorman	Las Vegas, NV
G/F	23	Glory Jones	—	Fr	Cypress Bay	Weston, FL
F	24	Bree Alford	6 ft 0 in (1.83 m)	RS Sr	Miramonte	Walnut Creek, CA
G/F	32	Brittney Reed	5 ft 10 in (1.78 m)	RS Fr	Vista Murrieta	Murrieta, GA
F	33	Gabby Green	6 ft 2 in (1.88 m)	RS Sr	Saint Mary's; California	Oakland, CA
G	35	Cierra Belvin	5 ft 8 in (1.73 m)	Jr	Long Beach Poly	Long Beach, CA
F/C	42	Meghan Mandel	6 ft 4 in (1.93 m)	RS So	Orono; Marquette	Plymouth, MN
C	44	Josie Buckingham	6 ft 5 in (1.96 m)	RS Sr	New Richmond; Minnesota	New Richmond, OH

Head coach

- Charity Elliott (Missouri State)

Assistant coach(es)

- Chris Elliott (Missouri State)
- Jhasmin Player (Baylor)
- Jasmin Holliday (Oregon)

Legend

- (C) Team captain
- (S) Suspended
- (I) Ineligible
- (W) Walk-on
- Injured
- Current redshirt

Roster

== Schedule ==
Date time, TV	Rank^{#}	Opponent^{#}	Result	Record	Site (attendance) city, state
Exhibition
Nov 1, 2018*; 7:00 pm		Point Loma Nazarene	W 81–53		Gersten Pavilion (160); Los Angeles, CA
Non-conference regular season
Nov 6, 2018*; 7:30 pm		UCLA	W 69–63	1–0	Gersten Pavilion (498); Los Angeles, CA
Nov 13, 2018*; 5:30 pm		at Arizona	W 66–64	2–0	McKale Center (852); Tucson, AZ
Nov 19, 2018*; 7:00 pm		at UC Santa Barbara	W 70–57	3–0	The Thunderdome (237); Santa Barbara, CA
Nov 23, 2018*; 3:00 pm		Northern Arizona; LMU Thanksgiving Classic semifinals	L 62–63	3–1	Gersten Pavilion (346); Los Angeles, CA
Nov 24, 2018*; 12:30 pm		Robert Morris; LMU Thanksgiving Classic consolation game	W 61–53	4–1	Gersten Pavilion (206); Los Angeles, CA
Nov 27, 2018*; 12:00 pm		UC Davis	W 60–53	5–1	Gersten Pavilion (1,878); Los Angeles, CA
Dec 1, 2018*; 12:00 pm		at Denver	L 75–104	5–2	Hamilton Gymnasium (310); Denver, CO
Dec 7, 2018*; 7:00 pm		at Cal State Northridge	W 72–53	6–2	Matadome (411); Northridge, CA
Dec 14, 2018*; 7:00 pm		Long Beach State	W 71–62	7–2	Gersten Pavilion (289); Los Angeles, CA
Dec 19, 2018*; 1:00 pm		vs. Indiana; Puerto Rico Classic	L 43–67	7–3	Mario Morales Coliseum; Guaynabo, PR
Dec 20, 2018*; 1:00 pm		vs. South Dakota; Puerto Rico Classic	L 40–67	7–4	Mario Morales Coliseum (150); Guaynabo, PR
Dec 21, 2018*; 10:30 am		vs. Grambling State; Puerto Rico Classic	L 61–62	7–5	Mario Morales Coliseum; Guaynabo, PR
WCC regular season
Dec 29, 2018; 2:00 pm		No. 20 Gonzaga	L 53–78	7–6 (0–1)	Gersten Pavilion (381); Los Angeles, CA
Dec 31, 2018; 2:00 pm		Portland	W 76–58	8–6 (1–1)	Gersten Pavilion (236); Los Angeles, CA
Jan 3, 2019; 6:00 pm		at San Diego	W 69–52	9–6 (2–1)	Jenny Craig Pavilion (233); San Diego, CA
Jan 5, 2019; 1:00 pm, BYUtv		at BYU	L 44–55	9–7 (2–2)	Marriott Center (852); Provo, UT
Jan 10, 2019; 7:00 pm		San Francisco	W 66–58	10–7 (3–2)	Gersten Pavilion (237); Los Angeles, CA
Jan 12, 2019; 1:00 pm		Santa Clara	L 75–83 ^{3OT}	10–8 (3–3)	Gersten Pavilion (198); Los Angeles, CA
Jan 19, 2019; 2:00 pm		at Pepperdine	L 86–95 ^{OT}	10–9 (3–4)	Firestone Fieldhouse (400); Malibu, CA
Jan 24, 2019; 11:00 am		at Pacific	W 72–67	11–9 (4–4)	Alex G. Spanos Center (4,373); Stockton, CA
Jan 26, 2019; 2:00 pm		at Saint Mary's	L 62–86	11–10 (4–5)	McKeon Pavilion (509); Moraga, CA
Jan 31, 2019; 5:00 pm		No. 25 BYU	W 61–58	12–10 (5–5)	Gersten Pavilion (246); Los Angeles, CA
Feb 3, 2019; 2:00 pm		San Diego	W 83–57	13–10 (6–5)	Gersten Pavilion (534); Los Angeles, CA
Feb 7, 2019; 7:00 pm		at Santa Clara	W 69–60	14–10 (7–5)	Leavey Center (380); Santa Clara, CA
Feb 9, 2019; 12:00 pm		at San Francisco	W 73–56	15–10 (8–5)	War Memorial Gymnasium (322); San Francisco, CA
Feb 15, 2019; 7:00 pm		Pepperdine	L 55–73	15–11 (8–6)	Gersten Pavilion (357); Los Angeles, CA
Feb 21, 2019; 7:00 pm		Saint Mary's	W 69–56	16–11 (9–6)	Gersten Pavilion (205); Los Angeles, CA
Feb 23, 2019; 2:00 pm		Pacific	L 75–81	16–12 (9–7)	Gersten Pavilion (276); Los Angeles, CA
Feb 28, 2018; 7:00 pm		at Portland	W 70–54	17–12 (10–7)	Chiles Center (288); Portland, OR
Mar 2, 2018; 2:00 pm		at No. 16 Gonzaga	L 58–68	17–13 (10–8)	McCarthey Athletic Center (6,000); Spokane, WA
WCC Women's Tournament
Mar 8, 2019; 12:00 pm, BYUtv	(5)	vs. (9) San Francisco; Second Round	W 66–45	18–13	Orleans Arena (5,237); Paradise, NV
Mar 9, 2019; 1:00 pm, BYUtv	(5)	vs. (4) Saint Mary's; Quarterfinals	L 38–70	18–14	Orleans Arena (5,339); Paradise, NV
WNIT
Mar 21, 2019*; 7:00 pm		Idaho; First Round	L 64–79	18–15	Gersten Pavilion (315); Los Angeles, CA
*Non-conference game. ^{#}Rankings from AP Poll. (#) Tournament seedings in parentheses.

== See also ==
- 2018–19 Loyola Marymount Lions men's basketball team
