= 2018–19 Saint Mary's Gaels women's basketball team =

Intercollegiate basketball season

2018–19 Saint Mary's Gaels women's basketball

Tulane Classic Champions

WNIT, Second Round
- Conference: West Coast Conference
- Record: 21–12 (12–6 WCC)
- Head coach: Paul Thomas (13th season)
- Assistant coaches: Allyson Fasnacht; Lisa O'Meara; Danielle Mauldin
- Home arena: McKeon Pavilion

2018–19 West Coast Conference women's basketball standings
	Conf.				Overall
Team	W		L	PCT	W		L	PCT
No. 16 Gonzaga	16	–	2	.889	29	–	5	.853
BYU †	15	–	3	.833	26	–	7	.788
Pepperdine	12	–	6	.667	22	–	12	.647
Saint Mary's	12	–	6	.667	21	–	12	.636
Pacific	10	–	8	.556	19	–	13	.594
Loyola Marymount	10	–	8	.556	18	–	15	.545
Santa Clara	6	–	12	.333	14	–	17	.452
Portland	5	–	13	.278	13	–	17	.433
San Diego	2	–	16	.111	9	–	21	.300
San Francisco	2	–	16	.111	7	–	24	.226
† 2019 WCC tournament winner As of March 23, 2019; Rankings from AP poll

The 2018–19 Saint Mary's Gaels women's basketball team represented Saint Mary's College of California in the 2018–19 NCAA Division I women's basketball season. The Gales, led by thirteenth year head coach Paul Thomas, played their home games at the McKeon Pavilion and were members of the West Coast Conference. They finished the season 21–12, 12–6 in WCC play to finish in fourth place. They advanced to the semifinals of the WCC women's tournament, where they lost to Gonzaga. They received an at-large bid to the Women's National Invitation Tournament, where they defeated Hawaii in the first round before losing to WCC member Pepperdine in the second round.

== Roster ==
2018–19 Saint Mary's Gaels women's basketball team
Players
Coaches

Pos.	#	Name	Height	Year	Previous school	Hometown
G	1	Milly Yates	5 ft 10 in (1.78 m)	RS Fr	SCECGS Redlands	Sydney, Australia
G	3	Jasmine Forcadilla	5 ft 8 in (1.73 m)	RS Jr	St. Joseph's Catholic	Terrigal, Australia
G	4	Taycee Wedin	5 ft 9 in (1.75 m)	Fr	La Salle	Milwaukie, OR
F	5	Madeline Holland	5 ft 11 in (1.8 m)	So	Archbishop Mitty	Burlingame, CA
G	10	Carly Turner	5 ft 11 in (1.8 m)	RS Sr	Australian Institute of Sport	Sydney, Australia
G	11	Morgan Malloy	5 ft 3 in (1.6 m)	RS Jr	Justin-Siena	Napa, CA
F	12	Sydney Raggio	6 ft 1 in (1.85 m)	Sr	St. Ignatius	San Bruno, CA
F	13	Tyra Moe	6 ft 1 in (1.85 m)	Jr	Punhou	Honolulu, HI
G	14	Jordyn Boesel	5 ft 9 in (1.75 m)	So	Okanogan	Okanogan, WA
G	20	Katie Rathbun	6 ft 0 in (1.83 m)	Sr	Carondelet	Concord, CA
G	21	Sam Simons	6 ft 2 in (1.88 m)	Fr	UC Senior Secondary	Adelaide, Australia
G	23	Emily Codding	6 ft 0 in (1.83 m)	So	Santa Rosa	Santa Rosa, CA
G	24	Brianna Simonich	5 ft 10 in (1.78 m)	So	Carondelet	Danville, CA
F	25	Megan McKay	6 ft 3 in (1.91 m)	Sr	St. Mary's Anglican	Katanning, Australia
C	33	Claire Ferguson	6 ft 3 in (1.91 m)	RS Jr	St. Thomas Aquinas; TCU	Olathe, KS

Head coach

- Paul Thomas (Wayne State College)

Assistant coach(es)

- Allyson Fasnacht (Liberty)
- Lisa O'Meara (St. Mary's)
- Danielle Mauldin (St. Mary's)

Legend

- (C) Team captain
- (S) Suspended
- (I) Ineligible
- (W) Walk-on
- Injured
- Current redshirt

Roster

== Schedule and results ==
Date time, TV	Rank^{#}	Opponent^{#}	Result	Record	Site (attendance) city, state
Non-conference regular season
Nov 9, 2018*; 6:30 pm		Wyoming	W 90–84	1–0	McKeon Pavilion (482); Moraga, CA
Nov 11, 2018*; 1:00 pm		at Washington State	W 70–64	2–0	Beasley Coliseum (397); Pullman, WA
Nov 17, 2018*; 6:00 pm		at No. 8 Oregon State	L 56–89	2–1	Gill Coliseum (4,329); Corvallis, OR
Nov 23, 2018*; 2:00 pm		Milwaukee; Saint Mary's Thanksgiving Classic	W 73–71	3–1	McKeon Pavilion (418); Moraga, CA
Nov 24, 2018*; 2:00 pm		No. 3 Oregon; Saint Mary's Thanksgiving Classic	L 55–79	3–2	McKeon Pavilion (963); Moraga, CA
Nov 29, 2018*; 12:00 pm		at UC Santa Barbara	W 80–55	4–2	The Thunderdome (682); Santa Barbara, CA
Dec 1, 2018*; 2:00 pm		at Cal Poly	W 69–51	5–2	Mott Athletics Center (575); San Luis Obispo, CA
Dec 8, 2018*; 2:00 pm		No. 13 California	L 78–81 ^{OT}	5–3	McKeon Pavilion (763); Moraga, CA
Dec 17, 2018*; 6:00 pm		at UC Davis	L 74–76	5–4	The Pavilion (414); Davis, CA
Dec 21, 2018*; 1:00 pm		vs. Texas State; Tulane Classic semifinals	W 89–62	6–4	Devlin Fieldhouse (768); New Orleans, LA
Dec 22, 2018*; 12:00 pm		vs. Old Dominion; Tulane Classic championship	W 83–65	7–4	Devlin Fieldhouse; New Orleans, LA
WCC regular season
Dec 31, 2018; 5:00 pm		at Pacific	L 67–76	7–5 (0–1)	Alex G. Spanos Center (483); Stockton, CA
Jan 3, 2019; 6:00 pm		at No. 17 Gonzaga	L 62–74	7–6 (0–2)	McCarthey Athletic Center (5,861); Spokane, WA
Jan 5, 2019; 2:00 pm		at Portland	W 89–81	8–6 (1–2)	Chiles Center (304); Portland, OR
Jan 10, 2019; 6:30 pm		San Diego	W 74–60	9–6 (2–2)	McKeon Pavilion (416); Moraga, CA
Jan 12, 2019; 2:00 pm		BYU	L 73–74	9–7 (2–3)	McKeon Pavilion (531); Moraga, CA
Jan 17, 2019; 7:00 pm		at San Francisco	W 80–65	10–7 (3–3)	War Memorial Gymnasium (249); San Francisco, CA
Jan 19, 2019; 2:00 pm		at Santa Clara	W 83–59	11–7 (4–3)	Leavey Center (384); Santa Clara, CA
Jan 24, 2019; 6:30 pm		Pepperdine	W 79–68	12–7 (5–3)	McKeon Pavilion (268); Moraga, CA
Jan 26, 2019; 2:00 pm		Loyola Marymount	W 86–62	13–7 (6–3)	McKeon Pavilion (509); Moraga, CA
Jan 31, 2019; 6:30 pm		Portland	W 113–85	14–7 (7–3)	McKeon Pavilion (232); Moraga, CA
Feb 2, 2019; 6:00 pm		No. 15 Gonzaga	L 52–66	14–8 (7–4)	McKeon Pavilion (480); Moraga, CA
Feb 7, 2019; 10:00 am		at BYU	W 78–75	15–8 (8–4)	Marriott Center (3,981); Provo, UT
Feb 9, 2019; 2:00 pm		at San Diego	W 80–49	16–8 (9–4)	Jenny Craig Pavilion (351); San Diego, CA
Feb 14, 2019; 6:30 pm		Santa Clara	W 81–68	17–8 (10–4)	McKeon Pavilion (265); Moraga, CA
Feb 16, 2019; 1:00 pm		San Francisco	W 88–63	18–8 (11–4)	McKeon Pavilion (375); Moraga, CA
Feb 21, 2019; 7:00 pm		at Loyola Marymount	L 56–69	18–9 (11–5)	Gersten Pavilion (205); Los Angeles, CA
Feb 23, 2019; 2:00 pm		at Pepperdine	L 72–77	18–10 (11–6)	Firestone Fieldhouse (335); Malibu, CA
Mar 1, 2019; 7:00 pm		Pacific	W 75–62	19–10 (12–6)	McKeon Pavilion (549); Moraga, CA
WCC Women's Tournament
Mar 9, 2019; 1:00 pm, BYUtv	(4)	vs. (5) Loyola Marymount; Quarterfinals	W 70–38	20–10	Orleans Arena (5,339); Paradise, NV
Mar 9, 2019; 12:00 pm, BYUtv	(4)	vs. (1) No. 12 Gonzaga; Semifinals	L 77–78 ^{2OT}	20–11	Orleans Arena (5,511); Paradise, NV
WNIT
Mar 22, 2019*; 7:00 pm		Hawaii; First Round	W 67–43	21–11	McKeon Pavilion (444); Moraga, CA
Mar 24, 2019*; 5:00 pm		Pepperdine; Second Round	L 61–65	21–12	McKeon Pavilion (325); Moraga, CA
*Non-conference game. ^{#}Rankings from AP Poll. (#) Tournament seedings in parentheses. All times are in Pacific Time.

== See also ==
- 2018–19 Saint Mary's Gaels men's basketball team
