= 2018–19 Pacific Tigers women's basketball team =

Intercollegiate basketball season

2018–19 Pacific Tigers women's basketball

WNIT, Second Round
- Conference: West Coast Conference
- Record: 19–13 (10–8 WCC)
- Head coach: Bradley Davis (4th season)
- Assistant coaches: Amy Starr; Amanda Brown; Lindsey Moore
- Home arena: Alex G. Spanos Center

2018–19 West Coast Conference women's basketball standings
	Conf.				Overall
Team	W		L	PCT	W		L	PCT
No. 16 Gonzaga	16	–	2	.889	29	–	5	.853
BYU †	15	–	3	.833	26	–	7	.788
Pepperdine	12	–	6	.667	22	–	12	.647
Saint Mary's	12	–	6	.667	21	–	12	.636
Pacific	10	–	8	.556	19	–	13	.594
Loyola Marymount	10	–	8	.556	18	–	15	.545
Santa Clara	6	–	12	.333	14	–	17	.452
Portland	5	–	13	.278	13	–	17	.433
San Diego	2	–	16	.111	9	–	21	.300
San Francisco	2	–	16	.111	7	–	24	.226
† 2019 WCC tournament winner As of March 23, 2019; Rankings from AP poll

The 2018–19 Pacific Tigers women's basketball team represented the University of the Pacific during the 2018–19 NCAA Division I women's basketball season. The Tigers were led by fourth year head coach Bradley Davis. They played their home games at Alex G. Spanos Center and were members of the West Coast Conference. They finished the season 19–13, 10–8 in WCC play to finish in a tie for fifth place. They advanced to the quarterfinals of the WCC women's tournament, where they lost to Pepperdine. They received an at-large bid to the WNIT, where they defeated Fresno State in the first round before losing to Arizona in the second round.

== Roster ==
2018–19 Pacific Tigers women's basketball team
Players
Coaches

Pos.	#	Name	Height	Year	Previous school	Hometown
G	0	Chelsea Lidy	5 ft 9 in (1.75 m)	Sr	Bishop Montgomery	Torrance, CA
F	1	Anaya Brooklyn McDavid	6 ft 1 in (1.85 m)	So	Bishop Alemany	Studio City, CA
G	2	Josephine Millard	6 ft 2 in (1.88 m)	Fr	Académie de Nancy-Metz	Nancy, France
G	3	Isabel Newman	6 ft 0 in (1.83 m)	So	Chaminade College Prep	Simi Valley, CA
G	4	Tylah King	6 ft 0 in (1.83 m)	Sr	Brisbane State	Brisbane, Australia
F	10	Savannah Sumsion	6 ft 2 in (1.88 m)	So	Springville	Springville, UT
C	12	Cassidy Johnson	6 ft 5 in (1.96 m)	Fr	Lehi	Lehi, UT
G	14	Jessica Blakeslee	5 ft 10 in (1.78 m)	Jr	Mercer Island	Mercer Island, WA
G	21	Ameela Li	5 ft 6 in (1.68 m)	Sr	Piedmont	Piedmont, CA
G	22	Valerie Higgins	6 ft 0 in (1.83 m)	RS So	Chaminade College Prep; USC	Granada Hills, CA
G	23	Lianna Tillman	5 ft 9 in (1.75 m)	So	Lincoln	Stockton, CA
F	33	Issy Parker	6 ft 2 in (1.88 m)	So	Brisbane State	Brisbane, Australia
G/F		Callie Kasier (redshirt)	5 ft 10 in (1.78 m)	Sr	Broomfield; Colorado State	Broomfield, CO

Head coach

- Bradley Davis (California)

Assistant coach(es)

- Amy Starr (Washington State)
- Amanda Brown (Gonzaga)
- Lindsey Moore (Nebraska)

Legend

- (C) Team captain
- (S) Suspended
- (I) Ineligible
- (W) Walk-on
- Injured
- Current redshirt

Roster

== Schedule ==
Date time, TV	Rank^{#}	Opponent^{#}	Result	Record	Site (attendance) city, state
Exhibition
Nov 2, 2018*; 7:00 pm		San Francisco State	W 89–41		Alex G. Spanos Center (392); Stockton, CA
Non-conference regular season
Nov 8, 2018*; 7:00 pm		William Jessup	Cancelled		Alex G. Spanos Center; Stockton, CA
Nov 11, 2018*; 2:00 pm		at UC Davis	W 83–80	1–0	The Pavilion (734); Davis, CA
Nov 18, 2018*; 2:00 pm		at No. 23 California	L 69–81	1–1	Maples Pavilion (502); Stanford, CA
Nov 23, 2018*; 3:00 pm		North Dakota State; Tiger Turkey Tip Off	W 75–68	2–1	Alex G. Spanos Center (461); Stockton, CA
Nov 24, 2018*; 3:00 pm		Wyoming; Tiger Turkey Tip Off	W 70–64	3–1	Alex G. Spanos Center (325); Stockton, CA
Nov 29, 2018*; 7:00 pm		at San Jose State	W 91–67	4–1	Event Center Arena (334); San Jose, CA
Dec 6, 2018*; 7:00 pm		Seattle	W 75–61	5–1	Alex G. Spanos Center (309); Stockton, CA
Dec 8, 2018*; 2:00 pm		UC Santa Barbara	W 69–53	6–1	Alex G. Spanos Center (418); Stockton, CA
Dec 17, 2018*; 4:00 pm		at UCF	L 57–64	6–2	CFE Arena (2,411); Orlando, FL
Dec 20, 2018*; 5:00 pm		at Lamar	L 66–82	6–3	Montagne Center (933); Beaumont, TX
Dec 22, 2018*; 2:00 pm		at Cal State Fullerton	W 72–64	7–3	Titan Gym (192); Fullerton, TX
WCC regular season
Dec 31, 2018; 5:00 pm		Saint Mary's	W 76–67	8–3 (1–0)	Alex G. Spanos Center (483); Stockton, CA
Jan 3, 2019; 7:00 pm		at Portland	W 76–66	9–3 (2–0)	Chiles Center (274); Portland, OR
Jan 5, 2019; 12:00 pm		at No. 17 Gonzaga	L 65–88	9–4 (2–1)	McCarthey Athletic Center (5,807); Spokane, WA
Jan 10, 2019; 7:00 pm		BYU	L 74–77	9–5 (2–2)	Alex G. Spanos Center (515); Stockton, CA
Jan 12, 2019; 2:00 pm		San Diego	W 79–47	10–5 (3–2)	Alex G. Spanos Center (409); Stockton, CA
Jan 17, 2019; 7:00 pm		at Santa Clara	W 74–70	11–5 (4–2)	Leavey Center (615); Santa Clara, CA
Jan 19, 2019; 12:00 pm		at San Francisco	W 85–75	12–5 (5–2)	War Memorial Gymnasium (274); San Francisco, CA
Jan 24, 2019; 11:00 am		Loyola Marymount	L 67–72	12–6 (5–3)	Alex G. Spanos Center (4,373); Stockton, CA
Jan 26, 2019; 4:00 pm		Pepperdine	W 78–67	13–6 (6–3)	Alex G. Spanos Center (2,217); Stockton, CA
Jan 31, 2019; 7:00 pm		No. 15 Gonzaga	L 51–63	13–7 (6–4)	Alex G. Spanos Center (551); Stockton, CA
Feb 2, 2019; 4:00 pm		Portland	W 77–67	14–7 (7–4)	Alex G. Spanos Center (2,731); Stockton, CA
Feb 7, 2019; 6:00 pm		at San Diego	W 70–53	15–7 (8–4)	Jenny Craig Pavilion (377); San Diego, CA
Feb 9, 2019; 1:00 pm, BYUtv		at BYU	L 49–75	15–8 (8–5)	Marriott Center (959); Provo, UT
Feb 14, 2019; 7:00 pm		San Francisco	W 74–48	16–8 (9–5)	Alex G. Spanos Center (419); Stockton, CA
Feb 16, 2019; 2:00 pm		Santa Clara	L 83–88	16–9 (9–6)	Alex G. Spanos Center (901); Stockton, CA
Feb 21, 2019; 7:00 pm		at Pepperdine	L 76–96	16–10 (9–7)	Firestone Fieldhouse (236); Malibu, CA
Feb 23, 2019; 2:00 pm		at Loyola Marymount	W 81–75	17–10 (10–7)	Gersten Pavilion (276); Los Angeles, CA
Mar 1, 2018; 7:00 pm		at Saint Mary's	L 62–75	17–11 (10–8)	McKeon Pavilion (549); Moraga, CA
WCC Women's Tournament
Mar 8, 2019; 2:00 pm, BYUtv	(6)	vs. (7) Santa Clara; Second Round	W 76–60	18–11	Orleans Arena (5,237); Paradise, NV
Mar 9, 2019; 3:00 pm, BYUtv	(6)	vs. (3) Pepperdine; Quarterfinals	L 84–87	18–12	Orleans Arena (5,339); Paradise, NV
WNIT
Mar 20, 2019*; 7:00 pm		at Fresno State; First Round	W 77–72	19–12	Save Mart Center (599); Fresno, CA
Mar 24, 2019*; 3:00 pm		at Arizona; Second Round	L 48–64	19–13	McKale Center (3,534); Tucson, AZ
*Non-conference game. ^{#}Rankings from AP Poll. (#) Tournament seedings in parentheses. All times are in Pacific Time.

== Rankings ==
2018–19 NCAA Division I women's basketball rankings

+ Regular season polls	Poll	Pre- Season	Week 2	Week 3	Week 4	Week 5	Week 6	Week 7	Week 8	Week 9	Week 10	Week 11	Week 12	Week 13	Week 14	Week 15	Week 16	Week 17	Week 18	Week 19	Final
AP																				N/A	
Coaches																					

Legend
	Increase in ranking
	Decrease in ranking
	No change
(RV)	Received votes
(NR)	Not ranked

== See also ==
2018–19 Pacific Tigers men's basketball team
