= Friendship Christian School (North Carolina) =

Private, Protestant, Christian school in North Carolina

Friendship Christian

Location
- 5510 Falls of Neuse Road; Raleigh, North Carolina 27609; United States; 35°51′25″N 78°36′55″W

Information
- Type: Private
- Religious affiliation: Baptist Christian
- Denomination: Baptist
- Established: 1970 (56 years ago)
- CEEB code: 343197
- Head of school: Mr. Les Walden
- Staff: 10
- Faculty: 40
- Grades: K–12
- Enrollment: 315
- Campus type: Suburban
- Colors: Forest green, gold, black, and white
- Athletics: North Carolina Independent Schools Athletic Association (NCISAA)
- Mascot: Falcons
- Accreditation: AACS; NCCSA
- Affiliation: Friendship Baptist Church
- Website: friendshipchristian.net

Friendship Christian School (FCS) is a private, Baptist, coeducational, primary and secondary day school located in Raleigh, North Carolina, United States. Also known as simply Friendship or FCS, the school seeks to educate students in a traditional Christian environment.

History:

Friendship Christian School was founded in 1970 as a ministry of Friendship Baptist Church located in Raleigh, North Carolina. The first graduating class was in 1980, and since then FCS has graduated over 1,000 students.

== Academics ==
- Lower School (Preschool K4-5th grades)
- Middle School (6th-8th grades)
- High School (9th-12th grades)
- Specialized Learning Center: Academic Success Center (ASC) for students with documented learning differences and Focus Learning Center (FLC), providing an occupational degree option for students with intellectual disabilities.

== Athletics ==
In 2018, Friendship Christian School switched from the NCCSA Athletic conference and joined the North Carolina Independent Schools Athletic Association (NCISAA). Friendship Athletics consists of Middle School/High School both men's and women's Cross Country, Soccer, Basketball, Baseball, Volleyball (women) and Golf (men). Friendship also has a women's cheerleading squad during basketball season.\
