= 2018–19 Iowa Hawkeyes women's basketball team =

American college basketball season

2018–19 Iowa Hawkeyes women's basketball

Big Ten tournament Champions

NCAA tournament, Elite Eight
- Conference: Big Ten Conference

Ranking
- Coaches: No. 8
- AP: No. 8
- Record: 29–7 (14–4 Big Ten)
- Head coach: Lisa Bluder (19th season)
- Assistant coaches: Jan Jensen; Jenni Fitzgerald; Raina Harmon
- Home arena: Carver–Hawkeye Arena

2018–19 Big Ten women's basketball standings
	Conf.				Overall
Team	W		L	PCT	W		L	PCT
No. 9 Maryland	15	–	3	.833	29	–	5	.853
No. 8 Iowa †	14	–	4	.778	29	–	7	.806
Rutgers	13	–	5	.722	22	–	10	.688
Michigan	11	–	7	.611	22	–	12	.647
Ohio State	10	–	8	.556	14	–	15	.483
Minnesota	9	–	9	.500	21	–	11	.656
Michigan State	9	–	9	.500	21	–	12	.636
Northwestern	9	–	9	.500	21	–	15	.583
Nebraska	9	–	9	.500	14	–	16	.467
Indiana	8	–	10	.444	21	–	13	.618
Purdue	8	–	10	.444	19	–	15	.559
Penn State	5	–	13	.278	12	–	18	.400
Wisconsin	4	–	14	.222	15	–	18	.455
Illinois	2	–	16	.111	10	–	20	.333
† 2019 Big Ten tournament winner Rankings from AP poll

The 2018–19 Iowa Hawkeyes women's basketball team represented the University of Iowa during the 2018–19 NCAA Division I women's basketball season. The Hawkeyes, led by 19th year head coach Lisa Bluder, played their home games at Carver–Hawkeye Arena in Iowa City, IA as members of the Big Ten Conference. They finished the season 29–7, 14–4 in Big Ten play to finish in second place. Iowa won the Big Ten Conference tournament championship game over Maryland, 90–76. They received an automatic bid to the NCAA women's tournament as the No. 2 seed in the Greensboro region where they defeated Mercer and Missouri in the first and second rounds, NC State in the Sweet Sixteen to advance to the Elite Eight for the first time since 1993. They lost to eventual national champion Baylor in the Elite Eight.

== Off-season ==
=== Departures ===
Name	#	Pos.	Height	Year	Hometown	Reason for departure
Chase Coley	4	F	6'3"	Senior	Minneapolis, MN	Completed college eligibility
Jinaya Houston	14	G	6'1"	Freshman	Davenport, IA	Left the sport
Carly Mohns	34	F	6'1"	Redshirt Junior	Brodhead, WI	Transferred to University of Wisconsin–Green Bay

=== Recruits ===
College recruiting
Name	Hometown	School	Height	Weight	Commit date
Monika Czinano; P	Watertown, MN	Watertown-Mayer	6 ft 3 in (1.91 m)	N/A	
Monika Czinano; P	Recruit ratings: ESPN: (90)				
Kate Martin; G	Glen Carbon, IL	Edwardsville	5 ft 11 in (1.80 m)	N/A	May 1, 2017
Kate Martin; G	Recruit ratings: ESPN: (90)				
Logan Cook; G	Iowa City, IA	Iowa City West	6 ft 1 in (1.85 m)	N/A	Aug 1, 2017
Logan Cook; G	Recruit ratings: ESPN: (88)				
Tomi Taiwo; G	Fishers, IN	Carmel	5 ft 9 in (1.75 m)	N/A	
Tomi Taiwo; G	Recruit ratings: ESPN: (88)				
Overall recruit ranking:
Note: In many cases, Scout, Rivals, 247Sports, On3, and ESPN may conflict in their listings of height and weight.; In these cases, the average was taken. ESPN grades are on a 100-point scale.; Sources: "2018 Player Commits". ESPN. Archived from the original on February 20, 2018.

== Roster ==
2018–19 Iowa Hawkeyes women's basketball team
Players
Coaches

Pos.	#	Name	Height	Year	Previous school	Hometown
G	1	Tomi Taiwo	5 ft 10 in (1.78 m)	Fr	Carmel	Carmel, IN
G	3	Makenzie Meyer	5 ft 10 in (1.78 m)	Jr	Mason City	Mason City, IA
G	5	Alexis Sevillian	5 ft 6 in (1.68 m)	RS So	Goodrich	Goodrich, MI
F	10	Megan Gustafson	6 ft 3 in (1.91 m)	Sr	South Shore	Port Wing, WI
G	11	Tania Davis	5 ft 4 in (1.63 m)	Sr	Goodrich	Grand Blanc, MI
G	20	Kate Martin (injured) (redshirt)	6 ft 0 in (1.83 m)	Fr	Edwardsville	Edwardsville, IL
F	21	Hannah Stewart	6 ft 2 in (1.88 m)	Sr	Bishop Ryan Catholic	Minot, ND
G	22	Kathleen Doyle (C)	5 ft 9 in (1.75 m)	Jr	Benet Academy	LaGrange Park, IL
F	23	Logan Cook	6 ft 1 in (1.85 m)	Fr	Iowa City West	Iowa City, IA
G	24	Zion Sanders (W)	5 ft 8 in (1.73 m)	So	Central	Evansville, IN
F/C	25	Monika Czinano	6 ft 3 in (1.91 m)	Fr	Watertown-Mayer	Watertown, MN
F/C	31	Paula Valiño Ramos	6 ft 3 in (1.91 m)	So	Ies Otero Pedrayo	Ourense, SP, Spain
F	43	Amanda Ollinger	6 ft 1 in (1.85 m)	Jr	Linn-Mar	Cedar Rapids, IA

Head coach

- Lisa Bluder (Northern Iowa)

Assistant coach(es)

- Jan Jensen (Drake)
- Jenni Fitzgerald (Drake)
- Raina Harmon (Central Michigan)
- Abby Stamp (Director of Player Development) (Iowa)
- Kathryn Reynolds (Director of Basketball Operations) (Iowa)
- Ryan Gruebel (Video Coordinator & Creative Director) (Ohio State)

Legend

- (C) Team captain
- (S) Suspended
- (I) Ineligible
- (W) Walk-on
- Injured
- Current redshirt

Roster
Last update: August 7, 2017

== Schedule and results ==
Date time, TV	Rank^{#}	Opponent^{#}	Result	Record	Site city, state
Exhibition
11/06/2018*; 7:00 pm	No. 13	Dakota Wesleyan	W 102–54		Carver–Hawkeye Arena (3,051); Iowa City, IA
Non-conference regular season
11/09/2018*; 7:00 pm	No. 13	Oral Roberts	W 90–77	1–0	Carver–Hawkeye Arena (3,644); Iowa City, IA
11/13/2018*; 6:00 pm, ESPN3	No. 13	at Western Kentucky	W 104–67	2–0	E. A. Diddle Arena (1,301); Bowling Green, KY
11/17/2018*; 7:00 pm	No. 13	North Carolina Central	W 106–39	3–0	Carver–Hawkeye Arena (3,238); Iowa City, IA
11/23/2018*; 4:15 pm	No. 12	vs. No. 25 West Virginia; Junkanoo Jam Bimini Division semifinals	W 84–81	4–0	Gateway Christian Academy; Bimini, Bahamas
11/24/2018*; 5:45 pm	No. 12	vs. Florida State; Junkanoo Jam Bimini Division championship	L 67–71	4–1	Gateway Christian Academy; Bimini, Bahamas
11/29/2018*; 6:00 pm, ESPN2	No. 14	at No. 1 Notre Dame; ACC–Big Ten Women's Challenge	L 71–105	4–2	Edmund P. Joyce Center (7,968); South Bend, IN
12/02/2018*; 2:00 pm	No. 14	Robert Morris	W 92–63	5–2	Carver–Hawkeye Arena (3,457); Iowa City, IA
12/05/2018*; 7:00 pm	No. 16	Iowa State; Iowa Corn Cy-Hawk Series	W 73–70	6–2	Carver–Hawkeye Arena (6,289); Iowa City, IA
12/08/2018*; 2:00 pm	No. 16	IUPUI	W 72–58	7–2	Carver–Hawkeye Arena (3,571); Iowa City, IA
12/16/2018*; 2:00 pm	No. 16	Northern Iowa	W 83–57	8–2	Carver–Hawkeye Arena (6,860); Iowa City, IA
12/21/2018*; 6:00 pm	No. 16	at Drake	W 91–82	9–2	Knapp Center (6,107); Des Moines, IA
Big Ten conference season
12/30/2018; 12:00 pm, ESPN2	No. 16	at No. 21 Michigan State	L 70–84	9–3 (0–1)	Breslin Center (9,520); East Lansing, MI
01/03/2019; 7:00 pm	No. 19	Nebraska	W 77–71	10–3 (1–1)	Carver–Hawkeye Arena (4,391); Iowa City, IA
01/07/2019; 7:00 pm	No. 17	Wisconsin	W 71–53	11–3 (2–1)	Carver–Hawkeye Arena (3,428); Iowa City, IA
01/10/2019; 7:00 pm, BTN	No. 17	at Purdue	L 57–62	11–4 (2–2)	Mackey Arena (5,843); West Lafayette, IN
01/14/2019; 7:00 pm, ESPN2	No. 22	at No. 23 Minnesota	W 81–63	12–4 (3–2)	Williams Arena (5,439); Minneapolis, MN
01/17/2019; 7:00 pm, BTN	No. 22	Michigan	W 75–61	13–4 (4–2)	Carver–Hawkeye Arena (6,287); Iowa City, IA
01/20/2019; 2:00 pm	No. 22	at Illinois	W 94–75	14–4 (5–2)	State Farm Center (3,019); Champaign, IL
01/23/2019; 7:00 pm	No. 17	No. 14 Rutgers	W 72–66	15–4 (6–2)	Carver–Hawkeye Arena (6,035); Iowa City, IA
01/27/2019; 2:00 pm	No. 17	Purdue	W 72–58	16–4 (7–2)	Carver–Hawkeye Arena (9,319); Iowa City, IA
02/01/2019; 11:00 am	No. 13	at Michigan; Rescheduled from January 31	L 81–90	16–5 (7–3)	Crisler Center (2,160); Ann Arbor, MI
02/03/2019; 1:00 pm	No. 13	at Penn State	W 81–61	17–5 (8–3)	Bryce Jordan Center (2,815); University Park, PA
02/07/2018; 8:00 pm, BTN	No. 16	No. 23 Michigan State	W 86–71	18–5 (9–3)	Carver–Hawkeye Arena (6,287); Iowa City, IA
02/10/2019; 3:00 pm, BTN	No. 16	at Ohio State	W 78–52	19–5 (10–3)	Value City Arena (5,344); Columbus, OH
02/14/2019; 7:00 pm	No. 14	Illinois	W 88–66	20–5 (11–3)	Carver–Hawkeye Arena (6,877); Iowa City, IA
02/17/2019; 12:00 pm, ESPN2	No. 14	No. 7 Maryland	W 86–73	21–5 (12–3)	Carver–Hawkeye Arena (10,716); Iowa City, IA
02/21/2019; 7:00 pm, BTN	No. 10	at Indiana	L 73–75	21–6 (12–4)	Simon Skjodt Assembly Hall (3,812); Bloomington, IN
02/25/2019; 7:30 pm, BTN	No. 12	at Nebraska	W 74–58	22–6 (13–4)	Pinnacle Bank Arena (5,071); Lincoln, NE
03/03/2019; 3:00 pm, BTN	No. 12	Northwestern	W 74–50	23–6 (14–4)	Carver–Hawkeye Arena (12,051); Iowa City, IA
Big Ten Women's Tournament
03/08/2019; 5:30 pm, BTN	(2) No. 10	vs. (10) Indiana; Quarterfinals	W 70–61	24–6	Bankers Life Fieldhouse; Indianapolis, IN
03/09/2019; 7:30 pm, BTN	(2) No. 10	vs. (3) Rutgers; Semifinals	W 72–67	25–6	Bankers Life Fieldhouse (4,414); Indianapolis, IN
03/10/2019; 5:00 pm, ESPN2	(2) No. 10	vs. (1) No. 8 Maryland; Championship Game	W 90–76	26–6	Bankers Life Fieldhouse (4,427); Indianapolis, IN
NCAA Women's Tournament
03/22/2019*; 1:00 pm, ESPN2	(2 G) No. 8	(15 G) Mercer; First Round	W 66–61	27–6	Carver–Hawkeye Arena (10,720); Iowa City, IA
03/24/2019*; 1:00 pm, ESPN2	(2 G) No. 8	(7 G) Missouri; Second Round	W 68–52	28–6	Carver–Hawkeye Arena (12,376); Iowa City, IA
03/30/2019*; 10:30 am, ESPN	(2 G) No. 8	vs. (3 G) No. 10 NC State; Sweet Sixteen	W 79–61	29–6	Greensboro Coliseum; Greensboro, NC
04/01/2019*; 6:00 pm, ESPN2	(2 G) No. 8	vs. (1 G) No. 1 Baylor; Elite Eight	L 53–85	29–7	Greensboro Coliseum (4,164); Greensboro, NC
*Non-conference game. ^{#}Rankings from AP Poll. (#) Tournament seedings in parentheses. G=Greensboro Region. All times are in Central Time.

== Rankings ==
Ranking movement Legend: ██ Increase in ranking. ██ Decrease in ranking. NR = Not ranked. RV = Received votes.
Poll	Pre	Wk 2	Wk 3	Wk 4	Wk 5	Wk 6	Wk 7	Wk 8	Wk 9	Wk 10	Wk 11	Wk 12	Wk 13	Wk 14	Wk 15	Wk 16	Wk 17	Wk 18	Wk 19	Final
AP	13	13	12	14	16	16	16	16	19	17	22	17	13	16	14	10	12	10	8	N/A
Coaches	17	17^	14	15	16	15	15	16	20	17	18	15	12	16	13	10	11	10	8	8

^Coaches did not release a Week 2 poll.

== 2019 WNBA draft ==
Round	Pick	Player	WNBA club
2	17	Megan Gustafson	Dallas Wings

== See also ==
2018–19 Iowa Hawkeyes men's basketball team
