= The Law Firm (basketball) =

Duo of Caitlin Clark and Monika Czinano

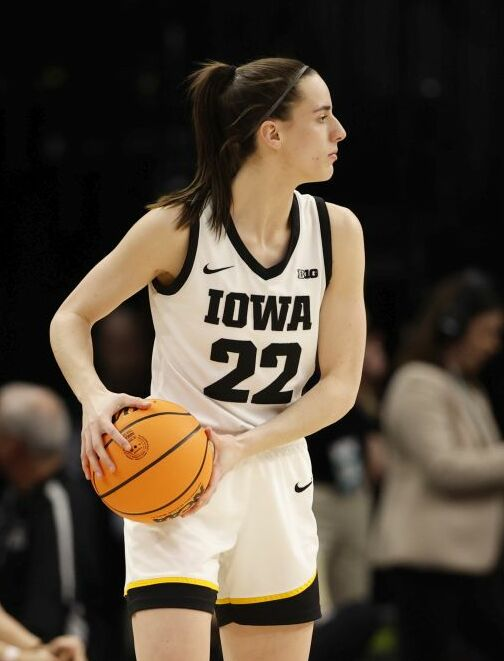
Caitlin Clark

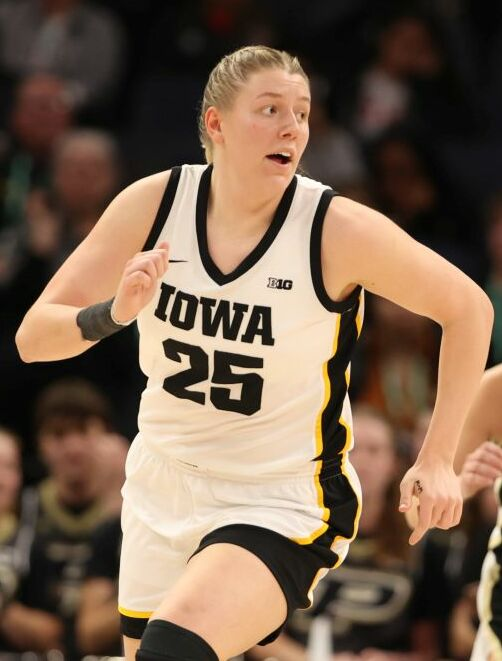
Monika Czinano

The Law Firm of Clark and Czinano, also known as The Law Firm, were a duo of college basketball players consisting of Caitlin Clark and Monika Czinano, who both played for the Iowa Hawkeyes from 2020 to 2023. Developed under head coach Lisa Bluder, they were one of the top duos in NCAA Division I, leading Iowa to the 2023 national championship game, two Big Ten tournament titles and one Big Ten regular season title.

== Background ==
Lightly recruited out of high school, Czinano was a reserve for Megan Gustafson in her freshman season at Iowa in 2018–19, before becoming the team's top post player as a sophomore in 2019–20. Clark was one of the top recruits in her class and joined the Hawkeyes in Czinano's junior season in 2020–21 as a starting guard. The duo was nicknamed "The Law Firm of Clark and Czinano," or simply "The Law Firm," by Big Ten Network analyst Christy Winters-Scott, and the nickname subsequently gained popularity among Iowa fans. They benefited from Clark's gravity as a three-point shooter, which spread out defenses and opened passing lanes between Clark and Czinano, as well as Czinano's improved shooting touch.

== Career ==
In the 2020–21 season, Clark and Czinano were named first-team All-Big Ten. They led Iowa to a runner-up finish at the Big Ten tournament, where each member of the duo made the all-tournament team while setting tournament records: Czinano in points and field goals, and Clark in assists. At the end of the season, Clark and Czinano ranked first and second, respectively, among Division I players in field goals. Czinano led the nation in field goal percentage (66.8), and Clark, who earned All-American honors, was the Division I leader in points per game (26.6) and total assists (214).

Entering the 2021–22 season, Iowa head coach Lisa Bluder described Clark and Czinano as one of the best point guard and center duos in the nation. They helped Iowa win Big Ten regular season and tournament titles in the same season for the first time in program history, with Clark being named tournament most outstanding player (MOP) and the duo earning all-tournament team honors. They were both first-team All-Big Ten selections, and Clark was named Big Ten Player of the Year. Clark was a unanimous first-team All-American, and Czinano received All-American honorable mention from the Associated Press (AP). Clark led Division I in points per game (27.0) and assists per game (8.0), and Czinano led the nation in field goal percentage (67.9). They became the first pair of men's or women's Division I teammates to lead the nation in those categories.

The duo played for a third season in 2022–23 after Czinano opted to use her fifth season of eligibility granted due to the COVID-19 pandemic. Clark and Czinano became the fourth and fifth Iowa players to reach 2,000 career points, respectively, and were the first teammates in Big Ten history to achieve the feat in the same season. They were both named first-team All-Big Ten, and Clark earned her second straight Big Ten Player of the Year award. Iowa won the 2023 Big Ten tournament, with Clark winning MOP and being joined by Czinano on the all-tournament team. Czinano set the tournament record for field goal percentage (91.7). At the 2023 NCAA tournament, they led the Hawkeyes to their first title game, losing to LSU. Clark was the consensus national player of the year, leading the nation in assists per game (8.6), and Czinano repeated as AP All-American honorable mention.

== Aftermath ==
In the 2023 WNBA draft, Czinano was selected by the Los Angeles Sparks in the third round. Clark was not eligible for the draft until 2024; under the collective bargaining agreement between the WNBA and its players' union, players born in the U.S., or who have played U.S. college basketball, cannot enter the draft until the calendar year of their 22nd birthday, they have received their bachelor's degree, or are set to earn said degree within three months of the draft (whichever comes first). Unlike Czinano, Clark chose not to take advantage of the COVID waiver, announcing near the end of her senior season that she would declare for the 2024 draft.
