= Grand Blanc Community Schools =

School district in Michigan, United States

Address
- 11920 South Saginaw Street Grand Blanc, Genesee, Michigan, 48439; United States
- Coordinates: 42°55′14.1″N 83°37′50.3″W

District information
- President: Susan Kish
- Vice-president: Ryan Yelen
- Superintendent: Dr. Trevor Alward
- Deputy superintendent(s): Barb Bailey and Jolene Kruse
- Schools: 13
- Budget: US$140,467,000 (2022-23 expenditures)
- NCES District ID: 2616350

Students and staff
- Students: 7,489 (2024-25)
- Teachers: 440.0 FTE (2024-25)
- Staff: 993.68 FTE (2024-25)
- Student–teacher ratio: 17.02 (2024-25)

Other information
- Website: www.gbcs.org

Grand Blanc Community Schools, or Grand Blanc School District, is a school district that serves the city of Grand Blanc, most of Grand Blanc Township, parts of the City of Burton, Mundy Township, and Atlas Township in Genesee County, Michigan, and a part of Holly Township, Michigan in Oakland County, Michigan.

== History ==
The first school between Waterford and Mackinaw is believed to have been built by Edmund Perry around 1830 on his land in Grand Blanc near part of the Thread Creek. Sarah Dayton is believed to have been the first teacher at the Grand Blanc school, however other accounts suggest Daniel Wakefield taught there. The school was founded on arithmetics as the main focus. The school was later moved farther down Perry Road near the Henry Mason farm. In 1933, another schoolhouse was built in the northern section of Grand Blanc Township. When the township was officially organized in 1833, the boards of school inspectors divided it into school districts. By 1878 there were ten school districts spread throughout the township.

In 1903 the state of Michigan passed a law allowing townships to consolidate school districts and mandate a busing system. In 1903–1904, the first consolidated school district in the state stood in Grand Blanc with three classrooms holding 115 students in 10 grades. Two horse-drawn vehicles bused children to the school until 1920 when two Ford Model-T chassis were purchased for $500 each.

In 1919 the Grand Blanc Rural Agricultural High School was organized and adopted the Smith-Hughes Agricultural Act curriculum. Specialized agricultural, home economics, and manual training classes were added. By 1920 the Grand Blanc School had five classrooms at the corner of Saginaw and Perry Rds.

The vote to create the first township unit school in Genesee County was passed by Grand Blanc voters in late 1920. In December of the same year, the school building was destroyed in a fire. In early 1921 a vote to build a new centralized school building carried by a two-thirds majority. Full township consolidation was voted for as well, meaning all students in the township would attend the new school. Warren Holmes was the architect from Lansing that designed the Grand Blanc Township Unit School (now the Perry Center) that was built at Saginaw & Perry Rds. in 1921–22. It was considered state-of-the-art at the time. It contained 15 classrooms in three stories with a gymnasium that had a seating capacity of 500. The building opened on January 9, 1922, with 350 students enrolled, and was accredited through the University of Michigan. Ten teachers, a principal, and a superintendent ran the school which now held 12 grades, eliminating the need to send juniors and seniors to Flint High School. Berneda Taylor, Ethel Tyler, and Ernest Somers returned from Flint High School to become the first graduating class of Grand Blanc in 1922. Over the next decade, the school grew to over 800 students, and was building was expanded.

It is likely the first football game was played around the year 1920. A football field was constructed near the building on Perry Rd. As early as 1930 the colors red and black represented the school, where they were nicknamed "The Big Reds" because of the big red school building they attended. Homecoming was held for the first time in 1936. A parade marched down Saginaw st. to the football field where the team played Fenton. The game drew over 2000 people to attend and Grand Blanc won 18–7.

In 1954, with the population still growing rapidly, a piece of land in Whigville became the home of the first dedicated elementary building, McGrath Elementary. Even before opening in 1955, the school was over capacity with an enrollment of over 700. The next elementary school was built at Hill and Belsay on land donated by Faye Myers, thus named Myers Elementary upon completion in 1957. An expansion in 1959 took the capacity from 330 to 690 students. Brendel Elementary was the next to be constructed.

In 1961 Grand Blanc passed a bond for $4 million to construct a new High School at Saginaw and Holly Rds., which opened in fall 1963 with a capacity of 1500 students. The architect was the Warren Holmes Company.

The old high school at Saginaw & Perry Rds. was renamed Grand Blanc Junior High School. Indian Hill Elementary and Reid Road Elementary were designed to be nearly identical and both opened in 1964. Anderson and Cook were added in 1966 and 1967, and the large brick building at Saginaw & Perry Rds. was officially renamed after Ezra W. Perry.

The Grand Blanc Township Unit School District was renamed the Grand Blanc Community Schools in the mid-1960s as well, and the population of Grand Blanc continued to grow, with enrollment reaching 8062 students by 1970. In 1976 the west campus building of Grand Blanc High School was opened to help with overcrowding issues at the high school. Jewitt Trail was installed to accommodate the new building.

In 1983 the district had to cut back due to falling enrollment and budgetary concerns. Cook Elementary was closed and leased to General Motors until it was reopened in 1987, while Reid Elementary was closed and leased to a church. Enrollment remained low through the 1980s but began to increase again by 1990. In the 1990s those schools were reclaimed and opened, and expansion began again. An addition was made to Grand Blanc High School again in 2000, and expansions to Reid, Indian Hill, and Brendel in 2002. Mason Elementary, a brand new elementary building, was also opened in April 2002. By 2004, Grand Blanc Middle School was the largest in the state. The district passed a bond to add two brand new middle school buildings, East and West, which were completed in 2006. Also in 2006, Tartoni Center, a 2800-seat indoor arena, was added to the high school at a cost of $9 million. In 2007, Grand Blanc Schools restarted its alternative education program, the Center For Student Success, on the High School west campus. By 2013, the district was the largest school district in Genesee County, surpassing Flint at over 8200 students enrolled.

In 2013, students at the City School, an experimental 215-day school elementary program housed at the Perry building, applied for and were granted a Michigan State Historical Marker for the Perry building at Saginaw & Perry Rds. in downtown Grand Blanc.

The Grand Blanc Bobcats, as they are now known, will celebrate the 100th anniversary of the football team in the fall of 2019 and the 100th graduating class from Grand Blanc High School in 2021–2022. In 2023, after 30 years at Frank Thomas Field, the Bobcats' original home, today Don Batchelor Field, was rebuilt as a 6,000-seat multipurpose stadium; the Bobcats' football team returned to Batchelor that September.

Grand Blanc Community Schools proposed a “Zero increase” $149 million bond.If passed it would include an expansion to the Perry Center, a high school performing arts center and the removal of the modular units and the construction of classroom additions at Cook and Myers Elementary. Voting is set for May 5, 2026.

== Controversy ==
In 2021, Grand Blanc School Board member Amy Facchinello stirred controversy with her Q-anon conspiracy posts to which she responded “I’m a victim of cancel culture" In 2023, School Board member Amy Facchinello was indicted by the Michigan Attorney General for her part in a fake electorate scheme in attempt to install Donald Trump as president after his loss in the 2020 election.

== Athletics ==
Grand Blanc
- School: Grand Blanc High School
- Nickname: Bobcats
- Saginaw Valley League: South
- Conference: SVL
- Athletic director: Jared Dohm
- Varsity teams: Boys: Basketball, Football, Ski, Tennis, Lacrosse; Girls: Ski, Tennis, Cheerleading, Basketball, Swim & Dive, Water Polo, Golf, Pom, Lacrosse, Softball, Volleyball
- Football stadium: Don Batchelor Stadium
- Arena: Frank Thomas Field
- Colors: Red, Black, and White
- Mascot: Bobcat
- Website: Grand Blanc Athletics

League	Start	End
County B	1950	1960
Big 8/9	1960/1962	2009
KLAA	2009	2018
SVL	2018	present

In 2006, the entire Big Nine Conference applied for membership in the Flint Metro League to encourage discussion on a merger with only a single team accepted. Grand Blanc Schools moved to the Kensington Lakes Activities Association starting in 2009–2010 season. In 2018 Grand Blanc moved to the Saginaw Valley League.

== See also ==
- Grand Blanc High School
