= Bob Suci =

American football player (1939–2015)

Profile
- Position: Defensive back

Personal information
- Born: April 7, 1939; Flint, Michigan
- Died: December 21, 2015 (aged 76); Grand Blanc, Michigan
- Listed height: 5 ft 10 in (1.78 m)
- Listed weight: 185 lb (84 kg)

Career information
- High school: Grand Blanc (MI)
- College: Michigan State University

Career history
- Houston Oilers (1962); Boston Patriots (1963)
- Stats at Pro Football Reference

Robert Leslie Suci (April 7, 1939 – December 21, 2015) was an American football player. He played college football for Michigan State University. He also played professional football in the American Football League for the Houston Oilers in 1962 and the Boston Patriots in 1963. He appeared in 20 AFL games and returned 25 punts for 233 yards (9.3 yds/return) and 17 kickoffs for 360 yards (21.2 yds/return). In 1963, he led the AFL with 272 interception return yards and two interceptions returned for touchdowns, including a 98-yard return. His 272 interception return yards in 1963 ranks as the ninth best single-season total in NFL history. He died in 2015 in Grand Blanc, Michigan, where he lived.
