= Chaldean Catholic Eparchy of Saint Thomas the Apostle of Detroit =

Eastern Catholic Eparchy in the United States

Eparchy of Saint Thomas the Apostle of Detroit Eparchia Sancti Thomas Apostoli Detroitensis Chaldaeorum
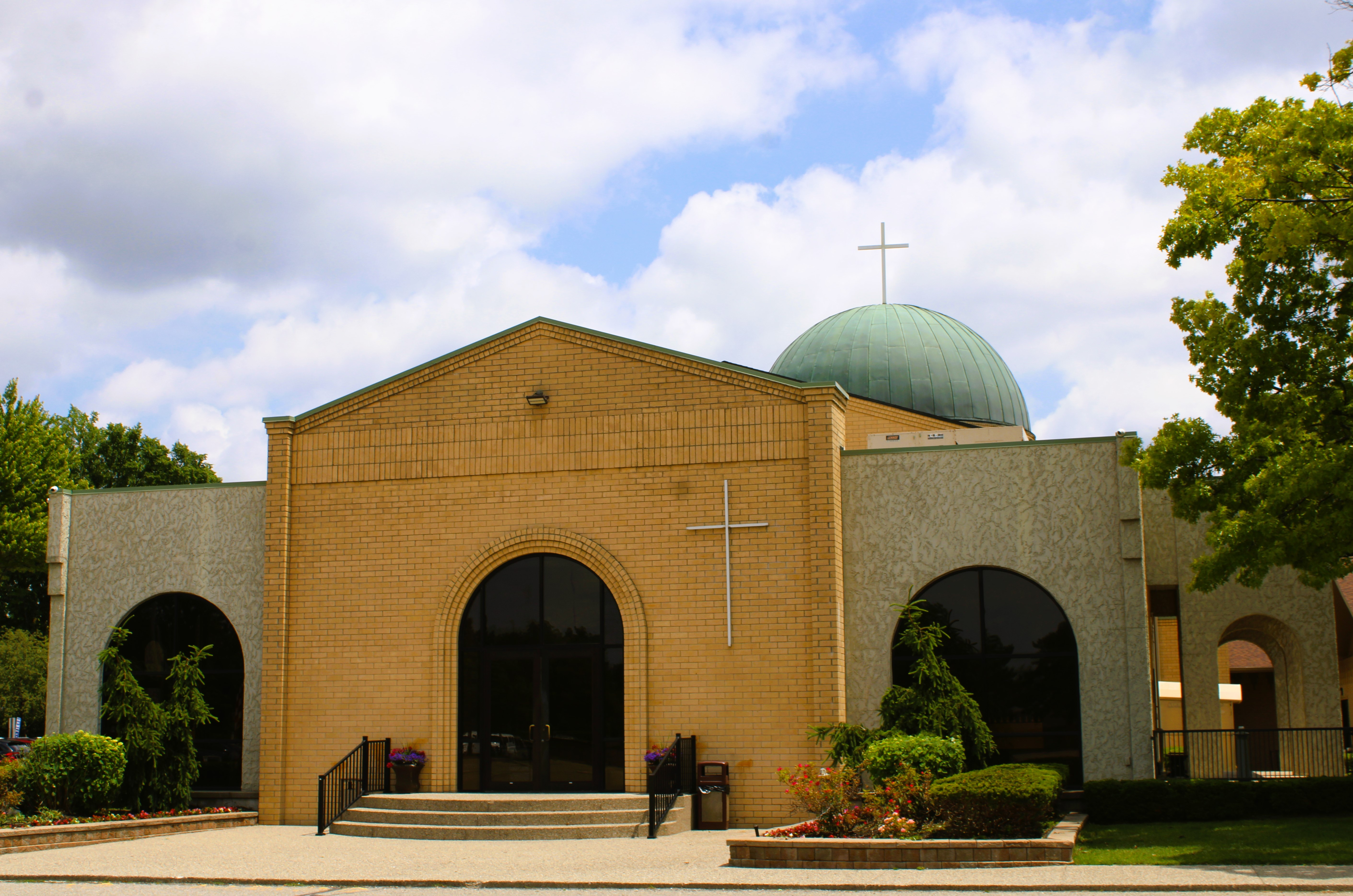
- Mother of God Cathedral

- Logo

Location
- Country: United States of America
- Territory: East USA
- Ecclesiastical province: Eastern Catholic Eparchies Immediately Subject to the Holy See

Statistics
- Population: (as of 2016); 150,000
- Churches: 13

Information
- Denomination: Chaldean Catholic Church
- Rite: Chaldean Rite
- Established: January 11, 1982 (44 years ago)
- Cathedral: Mother of God Cathedral
- Patron saint: Saint Thomas the Apostle

Current leadership
- Pope: Leo XIV
- Patriarch: Louis Raphael I Sako
- Bishop: Francis Y. Kalabat
- Vicar General: Rev. Fawaz Elia Kako
- Bishops emeritus: Ibrahim Namo Ibrahim

Map
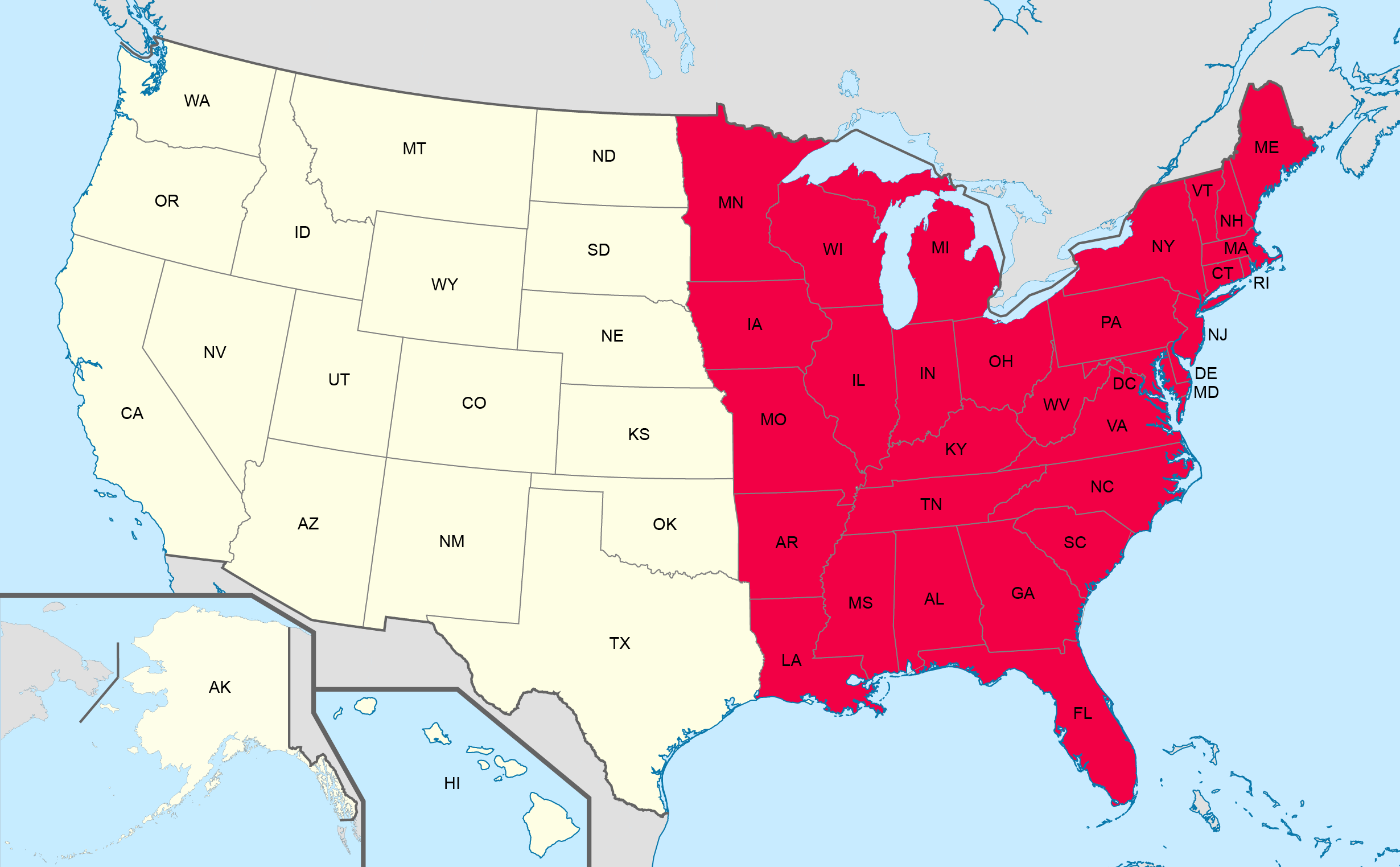

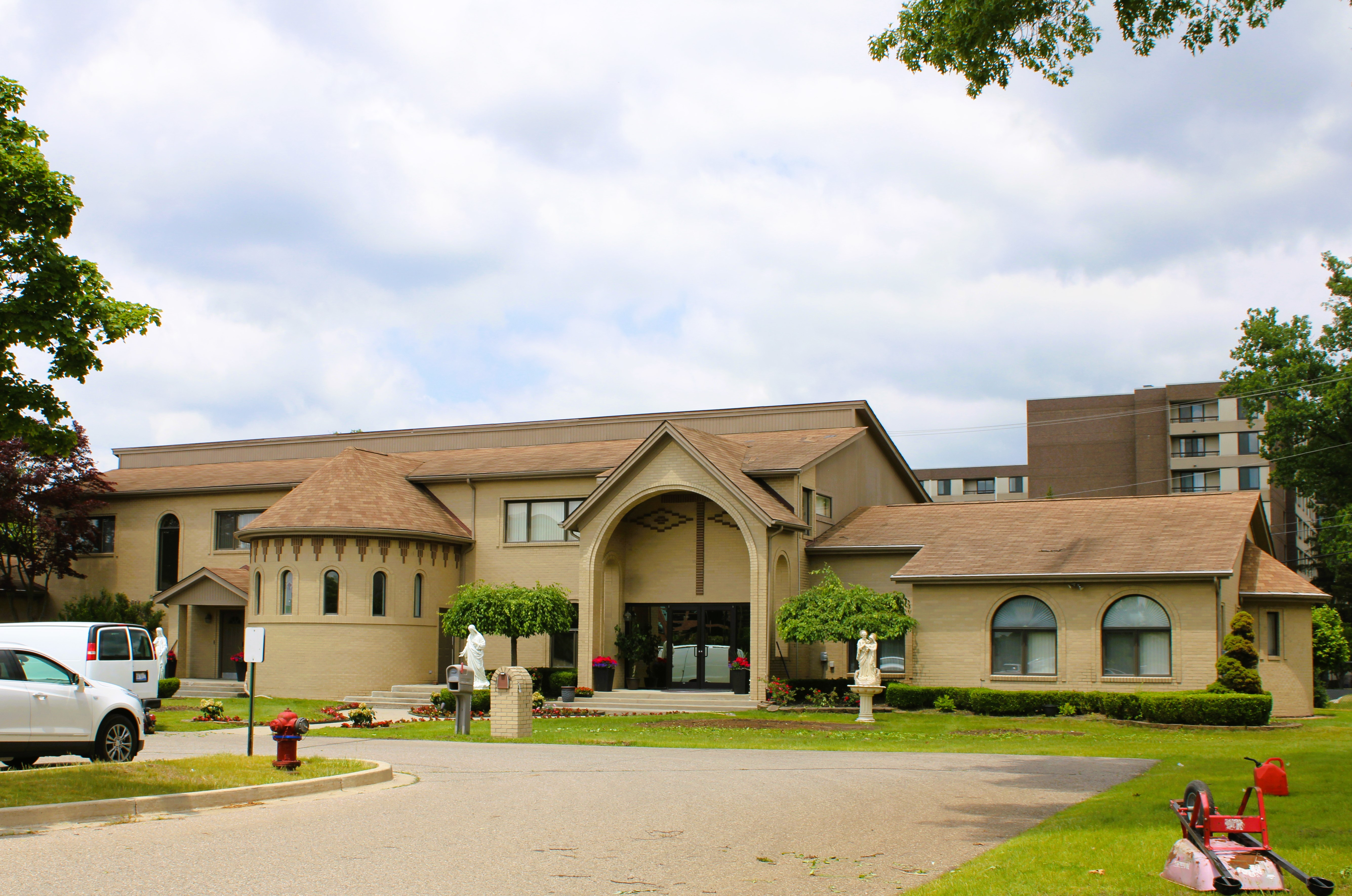
The diocesan pastoral center

The Chaldean Eparchy of Saint Thomas the Apostle in Detroit (Latin: Eparchia Sancti Thomas Apostoli Detroitensis Chaldaeorum) is a Chaldean Catholic Church eparchy of the Catholic Church in the Eastern United States. It practices the Syro-Oriental Rite in Classical Syriac. It is exempt, i.e. immediately subject to the Holy See, not part of any ecclesiastical province. Its cathedral episcopal see is Our Lady of Chaldeans Cathedral, located in Southfield, Michigan, United States.

== History ==
It was created by Pope John Paul II on January 11, 1982, as the Apostolic Exarchate of United States of America for the Chaldeans, covering the entire United States.

It was elevated to an eparchy, an Eastern-rite Catholic diocese, led by an eparch (bishop) on August 3, 1985.

On 21 May 2002 it lost vast territory to establish the Chaldean Catholic Eparchy of Saint Peter the Apostle of San Diego.

== Bishops ==
(all Chaldean Rite)

=== Episcopal ordinaries ===
Apostolic Exarch of United States of America

- Ibrahim Namo Ibrahim (1982.01.11 – 1985.08.03 see below), Titular Bishop of Anbar of the Chaldeans (January 11, 1982 – 1985.08.03)

Exempt Eparchs (Bishops) of Saint Thomas the Apostle of Detroit

- Ibrahim Namo Ibrahim (1985.08.03 - retired May 3, 2014)
- Francis Y. Kalabat (June 14, 2014 - ...)

=== Other priest of this eparchy who became bishop ===
- Emmanuel Hanna Shaleta (Challita), appointed Bishop of Mar Addai of Toronto (Chaldean), Canada in 2015

== Parishes and missions ==
=== Churches ===
- Mother of God Cathedral, Southfield, Michigan
- Holy Cross Chaldean Catholic Church, Farmington Hills, Michigan
- Holy Martyrs Chaldean Catholic Church, Sterling Heights, Michigan
- Mar Addai Chaldean Catholic Church, Oak Park, Michigan
- Our Lady of Perpetual Help Chaldean Catholic Church, Warren, Michigan
- Sacred Heart Chaldean Catholic Church, Warren, Michigan
- St. George Chaldean Catholic Church, Shelby Township, Michigan
- St. Joseph Chaldean Catholic Church, Troy, Michigan
- St. Paul Chaldean Catholic Church, Grand Blanc, Michigan
- St. Thomas Chaldean Catholic Church, West Bloomfield, Michigan
- Mart Mariam Chaldean Catholic Church, Northbrook, Illinois
- St. Ephrem Chaldean Catholic Church, Chicago, Illinois

=== Missions ===
- Chaldean Catholic Mission in Wayland, Massachusetts
- Chaldean Catholic Mission in Jacksonville, Florida

=== Religious centers ===
- Our Lady of the Fields Camp and Retreat Center, Brighton, Michigan
- Eastern Catholic Re-Evangelization Center (ECRC), Bloomfield Township, Michigan

=== Monasteries and convents ===
- Our Lady of Chaldeans Sisters Convent, Farmington Hills, Michigan
