= Grand Blanc High School =

High school in Grand Blanc, Michigan, United States

Location
- One Jewett Trail; Grand Blanc, Michigan 48439; United States; 42°55′7″N 83°37′29″W

Information
- Established: 1964
- School district: Grand Blanc Community Schools
- Principal: Michael Fray
- Teaching staff: 122.01 (FTE)
- Grades: 9–12
- Enrollment: 2,470 (2023–2024)
- Student to teacher ratio: 20.24
- Colors: Red and black
- Fight song: Onward to Victory
- Athletics conference: Saginaw Valley League
- Nickname: Bobcats
- Rival: Carman-Ainsworth High School
- Website: School website

Student assessments
- 2021–22 school year Change vs. prior year

M-STEP 11th grade proficiency rates (Science / Social Studies)
- Advanced %: 19.2 / 16.1
- Proficient %: 32.1 / 33.4
- PR. Proficient %: 12.8 / 38.3
- Not Proficient %: 35.9 / 12.1

Average test scores
- SAT Total: 982.8 (▼ −31.4)

Grand Blanc High School (GBHS) is a public high school in Grand Blanc, Michigan, in the United States. It is managed by Grand Blanc Community Schools.

== Demographics ==
The demographic breakdown of the 2699 students enrolled for the 2012–2013 school year is as follows:

- Male – 51.9%
- Female – 48.1%
- Native American/Alaskan – 0.3%
- Asian/Pacific islander – 2.8%
- Black – 14.9%
- Hispanic – 3.1%
- White – 74.6%
- Multiracial – 4.3%

== Athletics ==
The following sports are offered at Grand Blanc:

- Baseball (boys) . state champs in 2021
- Basketball (girls & boys) boys state champs in 2021
- Bowling (girls & boys)
- Competitive cheer (girls)
- Cross country (girls & boys)
  - Boys state champion – 1977, 1979
- Football (boys)
- Golf (girls & boys)
  - Boys state champion – 2004, 2008
  - Girls state champion – 1985, 1988, 1991, 2000, 2004, 2005, 2006, 2007
- Ice Hockey (boys)
- Lacrosse (girls & boys)
- Skiing (girls & boys)
- Soccer (girls & boys)
- Softball (girls)
- Swim & dive (girls & boys)
- Tennis (girls & boys)
- Track & field (girls & boys)
- Volleyball (girls)
- Wrestling (boys)

Most teams participate in the Saginaw Valley League as of 2018.

== Extracurricular activities ==
Grand Blanc High School includes six bands: Concert Band, Symphonic Band, Wind Ensemble, Marching Band, Pep Band, and Jazz Band. There are also four orchestras: Concert Orchestra, Advanced Orchestra, Symphony Orchestra, and Orchestra Pit.

Grand Blanc High School's FRC team the "EngiNERDs" (Team 2337) qualified for the FIRST Championship in Houston, Texas in the 2023 season. They were defeated in the finals of the Galileo Division.

The Grand Blanc High School Quiz Bowl team competes in Michigan Quiz Bowl as part of the NAQT.

== Notable alumni ==
- Dennis Busby (2018), NHL Draft Pick
- Andrew Caldwell (2007), actor
- Zach Carroll (2012), professional soccer player
- Carson Dach (1998), NFL Long Snapper
- Ty Dellandrea (2018), ice hockey player
- Grant Fisher (2015), Olympic Distance Runner
- Geena Gall (2005), Olympic mid-distance runner
- Gabe Martin (2010), NFL Linebacker
- Karen Newman (1978), singer
- Rob Paulsen (1974), voice actor and singer
- Stephen Smale (1948), mathematician
- Steve Smith (1980), CFL quarterback
- Bob Suci (1958), NFL Defensive Back
