= Mother of God Cathedral (Southfield, Michigan) =

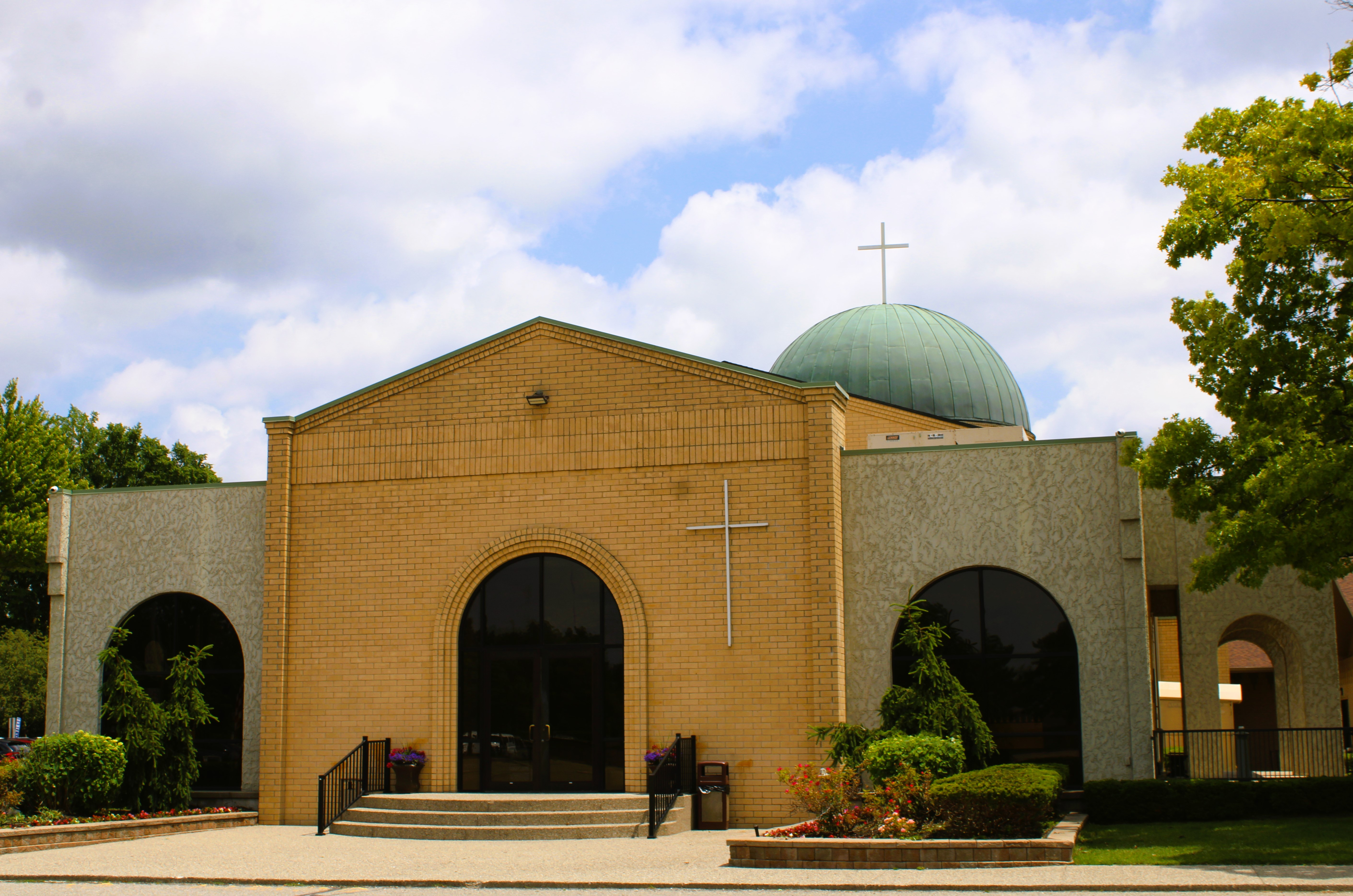
- Mother of God Cathedral in 2023
- Mother of God Cathedral
- 42°28′34.34″N 83°16′47.56″W
- Location: 25585 Berg Rd. Southfield, Michigan
- Country: United States
- Denomination: Chaldean Catholic Church

History
- Founded: 1948

Architecture
- Style: Byzantine Revival
- Completed: 1980

Administration
- Diocese: Eparchy of St. Thomas the Apostle of Detroit

Clergy
- Bishop: His Excellency Francis Y. Kalabat
- Rector: Rev. Pierre Konja

Mother of God Cathedral also called Our Lady of Chaldeans is a Chaldean Catholic cathedral located in Southfield, Michigan, United States. It is the seat for the Eparchy of St. Thomas the Apostle of Detroit.

== History ==
The first Assyrian people to immigrate to the United States arrived at the end of nineteenth century. Although small in number they were spread across the country by the middle of the twentieth century. Mother of God Church was established in Southfield in 1948. The present church building was completed in 1980 in the Byzantine Revival style. It became a cathedral when the Eparchy of St. Thomas the Apostle of Detroit was established in 1982.

== See also ==
- List of Catholic cathedrals in the United States
- List of cathedrals in the United States
