= Monika Czinano =

American basketball player

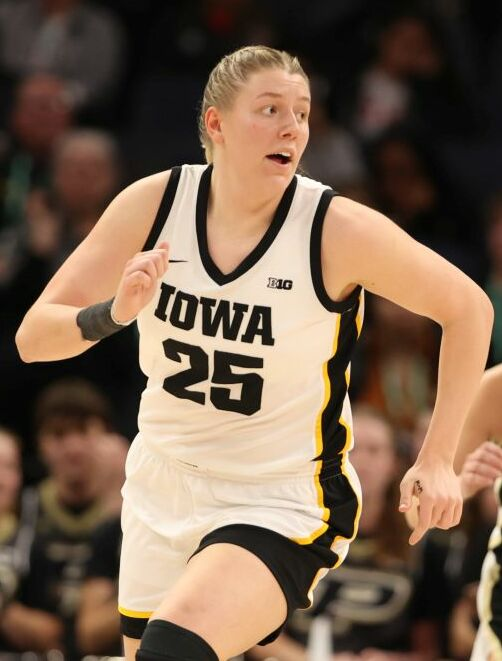
- Czinano with Iowa in 2023

No. 25 – TFSE-MTK
- Position: Power forward / Center
- League: Nemzeti Bajnokság I/A (Budapest, Hungary)

Personal information
- Born: January 20, 2000 (age 26) Stillwater, Minnesota, U.S.
- Listed height: 6 ft 3 in (1.91 m)

Career information
- High school: Watertown Mayer (Watertown, Minnesota)
- College: Iowa (2018–2023)
- WNBA draft: 2023: 3rd round, 26th overall pick
- Drafted by: Los Angeles Sparks
- Playing career: 2023–2024
- Number: 25

Career history
- 2023–2024: TFSE-MTK

Career highlights
- 2× Honorable mention All-American – AP (2022, 2023); 4× First-team All-Big Ten (2020–2023)
- Stats at Basketball Reference

Monika Sharon Czinano (/sɪˈnɒnoʊ/; si-NON-oh; born January 20, 2000) is an American professional basketball player. She plays the power forward and center positions. Czinano, who hails from Watertown, Minnesota, joined the Hawkeye women’s basketball program in 2018. As a freshman, she played behind former Hawkeye Megan Gustafson in the 2018–19 season, and took over the starting center position in 2019–20.

She achieved a major milestone during her senior season at Iowa, becoming the fifth Hawkeye to surpass 2,000 career points and the 38th all-time in Big Ten Conference history. Czinano and her teammate Caitlin Clark made history as the first pair of teammates to surpass 2,000 career points in the same season in Big Ten women's basketball history. Together, Czinano and Clark were known as The Law Firm.

She was drafted in the third round of the 2023 WNBA draft by the Los Angeles Sparks but was waived on May 15th. For the 2023/24 season, Czinano played for TFSE-MTK Budapest in Eurobasket's Hungary-A Division. In November 2024, she announced she was moving on from basketball and pursuing a career as a doctor.

== Career statistics ==
Legend
GP	Games played	GS	Games started	MPG	Minutes per game	FG%	Field goal percentage
3P%	3-point field goal percentage	FT%	Free throw percentage	RPG	Rebounds per game	APG	Assists per game
SPG	Steals per game	BPG	Blocks per game	TO	Turnovers per game	PPG	Points per game
**Bold**	Career high	*	Led Division I

=== College ===
Monika Czinano NCAA statistics
Year	Team	GP	GS	MPG	FG%	3P%	FT%	RPG	APG	SPG	BPG	TO	PPG
2018–19	Iowa	34	0	5.3	.549	—	.500	0.9	0.1	0.1	0.1	**0.4**	1.9
2019–20	Iowa	29	28	28.0	**.679**	—	.709	5.0	0.8	0.4	**0.6**	1.9	16.0
2020–21	Iowa	30	30	**29.6**	.668*	—	.680	5.8	1.3	0.4	**0.6**	2.0	19.3
2021–22	Iowa	31	31	28.7	**.679***	—	**.843**	6.2	1.0	0.3	0.3	1.3	**21.2**
2022–23	Iowa	**38**	**38**	27.9	.674	.000	.794	**6.5**	**1.4**	**0.8**	0.4	2.0	17.1
**Career**		162	127	23.7	.671	.000	.753	4.9	0.9	0.4	0.4	1.5	14.9

== See also ==
- List of NCAA Division I women's basketball career field-goal percentage leaders
