= Karen Newman =

American musician

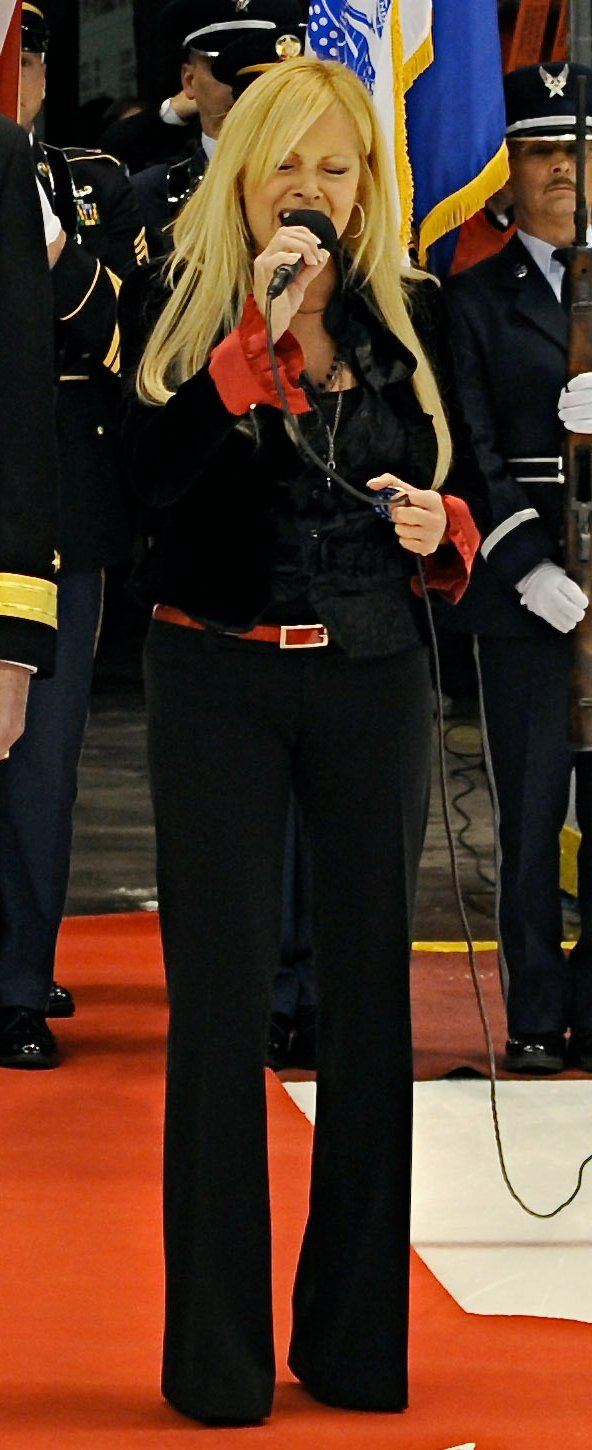
- Newman singing "The Star-Spangled Banner" before a Detroit Red Wings game at Joe Louis Arena on November 11, 2010

Background information
- Born: Detroit, Michigan, U.S.A.
- Genres: Rock music
- Years active: 1980s–2018
- Label: High Heel Records

Karen Newman is an American singer. She is best known for singing the U.S. national anthem at Detroit Red Wings home games, a role she has performed for more than 30 years.

== Biography ==
Newman was raised in the Michigan towns of Rochester and Grand Blanc, and was a 1978 graduate of Grand Blanc High School. From there, she studied music at Oakland University. She is best known for being "the voice" of the National Hockey League's Detroit Red Wings, regularly performing the national anthem before the team's home games, both at Joe Louis and Little Caesars Arenas. She has been called "the Red Wings' Own". Newman has toured with Bob Seger and Kid Rock.

Newman has released five CDs, including the patriotic EP How Far We've Come, which includes the American and Canadian national anthems. Her single "Christmas Eve on Woodward Avenue" has become a traditional favorite for many Detroit radio stations, and has been included for many years as part of the Detroit Thanksgiving Parade.

Newman is also known for her annual Christmas concerts, which began with the regional hit "Christmas Eve on Woodward Avenue", a tribute to her hometown Detroit.

She has done numerous television commercials for local and national companies, and has served as celebrity spokesperson for John Bowman Chevrolet, Evola Music, Discount Tire Company, Sargent Appliance, Hanson Windows, Diabetes Care Education Association, and St. John Providence Health Systems' "Because We Care" campaign. She works with and supports numerous local children's and animal charities in and around Michigan.

Newman and her family live in a suburb of Detroit.

Karen returned to Little Caesars Arena to sing the US national anthem for the retirement of Sergei Fedorov's sweater number 91, and banner hanging, on January 12, 2026.
