= Ibrahim Namo Ibrahim =

His Grace, The Most Reverend Ibrahim Namo Ibrahim
- Eparch Emeritus of Saint Thomas the Apostle of Detroit
- Church: Chaldean Catholic Church
- Diocese: Chaldean Catholic Eparchy of Saint Thomas the Apostle of Detroit
- Appointed: August 3, 1985
- Retired: May 3, 2014
- Predecessor: First Eparch
- Successor: Francis Y. Kalabat,
- Previous post: Apostolic Exarch of United States of America and Titular Bishop of Anbar (1982-1985)

Orders
- Ordination: December 30, 1962
- Consecration: March 7, 1982 by Paul II Cheikho, Emmanuel III Delly, George Garmo, Stéphane Babaca, Stéphane Katchou, Abdul-Ahad Sana, and Abdul-Ahad Rabban

Personal details
- Born: October 10, 1937 (age 88) Tel Keppe, Iraq

Styles of Ibrahim Namo Ibrahim
- Reference style: His Grace; The Most Reverend
- Spoken style: His Grace
- Religious style: Eparch

Ibrahim Namo Ibrahim (born October 1, 1937) is a bishop of the Chaldean Catholic Church in the United States. He served as the Apostolic Exarch of United States of America from 1982 to 1985, and then, following its elevation, as the first eparch (bishop) of the Chaldean Catholic Eparchy of Saint Thomas the Apostle of Detroit, from 1985 until his retirement in 2014. Bishop Francis Y. Kalabat was named to succeed him as Eparch.

== Biography ==
Born in Tel Keppe, Iraq to a Chaldo-Assyrian family in 1937, Ibrahim was later ordained a priest on December 30, 1962.

Ibrahim travelled to Rome in 1972 for Rome to study at the Pontifical University of St. Thomas Aquinas Angelicum earning a doctorate in theology in 1975.

Pope John Paul II named him as the Titular Bishop of Anbar dei Caldei and Apostolic Exarch of the United States of America on January 11, 1982. He was ordained a bishop by Patriarch Paul II Cheikho of the Chaldean Catholic Church on March 7, 1982. The principal co-consecrators were Archbishops Emmanuel-Karim Delly, Curial Bishop of Babylon, George Garmo of Mosul, Stéphane Babaca of Arbil, Stéphane Katchou of Basra, and Bishops Abdul-Ahad Sana of Alquoch and Abdul-Ahad Rabban, O.A.O.C. of Aqrā. On August 3, 1985, Pope John Paul II elevated the Apostolic Exarchate to an Eparchy and Ibrahim was named its first bishop.

== See also ==
- Catholic Church hierarchy
- Catholic Church in the United States
- Historical list of the Catholic bishops of the United States
- List of Catholic bishops of the United States
- Lists of patriarchs, archbishops, and bishops

== Episcopal succession ==
Catholic Church titles
Preceded by First Eparch	Eparch of Saint Thomas the Apostle of Detroit; 1985-2014	Succeeded by Francis Y. Kalabat
Preceded by -	Apostolic Exarch of the United States; 1982-1985	Succeeded by -
