= Goodrich Area Schools =

Public Schools in Michigan, United States

Address
- 8029 S Gale Road Goodrich, Genesee County, Michigan, 48348; United States

District information
- Grades: Pre-Kindergarten-12
- Superintendent: Mike Baszler
- Schools: 4
- Budget: $32,990,000 2022-2023 total expenditures
- NCES District ID: 2616320

Students and staff
- Students: 1,916 (2024-2025)
- Teachers: 101.8 (on an FTE basis) (2024-2025)
- Staff: 258.88 FTE (2024-2025)
- Student–teacher ratio: 18.82 (2024-2025)

Other information
- Website: www.goodrichschools.org

Goodrich Area Schools is a public school district in Genesee County, Michigan. It serves Goodrich and parts of Atlas Township, Grand Blanc Township, and Davison Township. It also serves small parts of Groveland Township in Oakland County and Hadley Township in Lapeer County.

== History ==
Goodrich High School was in existence by 1883, when it was first mentioned in a local newspaper.

Prior to the opening of the current Goodrich High School in 1963, the high school used a building built in 1913. It was on Erie Street next to the Wheelock Auditorium, now part of Reid Elementary. The sports teams were known as the Gladiators until 1930, when they were renamed the Martians after the Roman god of war.

== Schools ==
Schools in Goodrich Area Schools district
Building	Built	Address	Notes
Goodrich High School	1963	8029 Gale Rd., Goodrich	Grades 9-12
Goodrich Middle School	2002	7480 Gale Rd., Goodrich	Grades 6-8
Oaktree Elementary	1997	7500 Gale Rd., Goodrich	Grades 2-5
Reid Elementary	1951	7501 Seneca St., Goodrich	Grades PreK-1
