= Grand Blanc Township, Michigan =

- Charter township
- Charter Township of Grand Blanc
- Seal

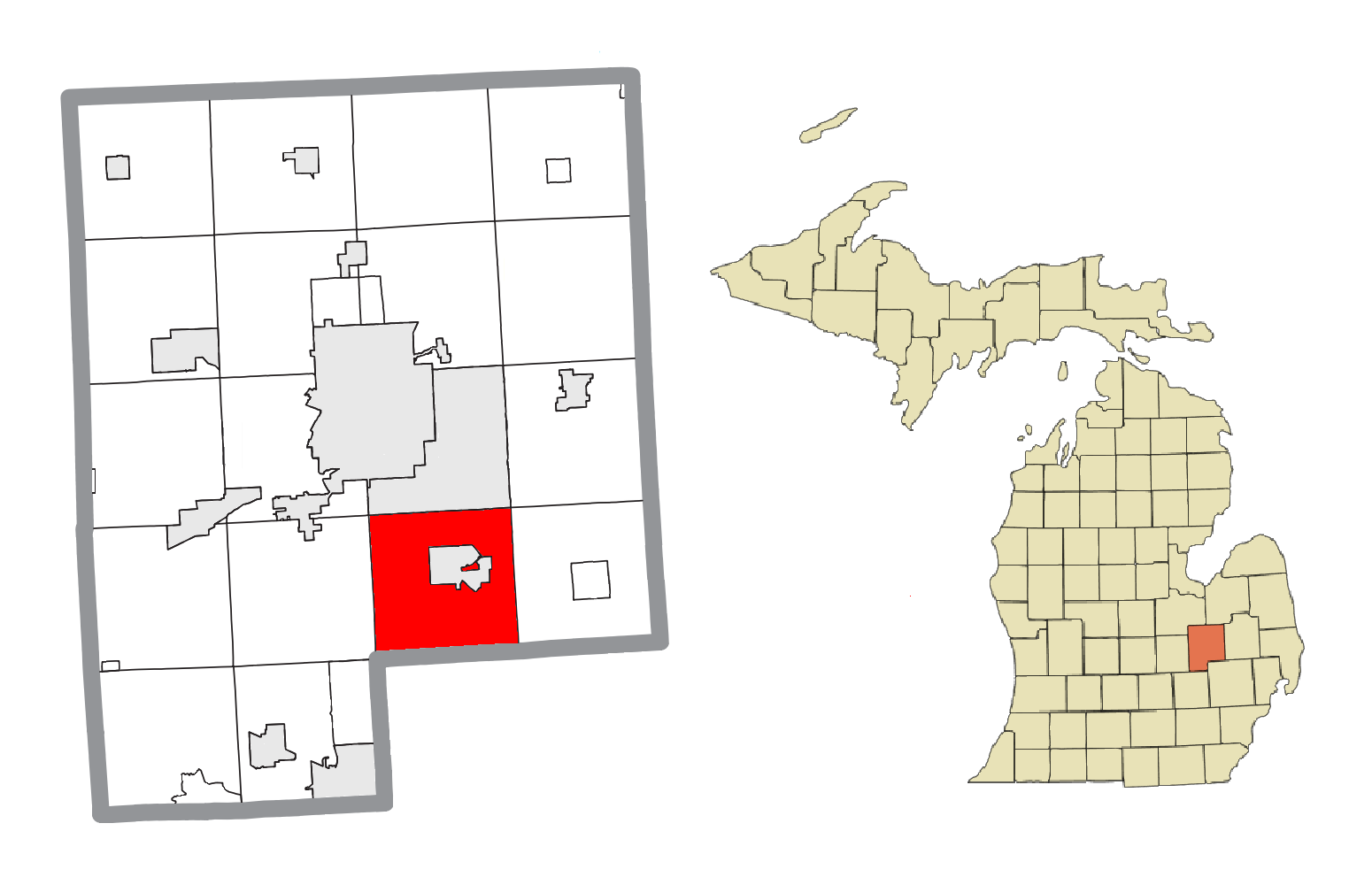
- Location within Genesee County

- Location within the state of Michigan
- Coordinates: 42°56′05″N 83°38′49″W
- Country: United States
- State: Michigan
- County: Genesee
- Settled: 1823
- Organized: 1833

Government
  - Supervisor: Scott Bennett
  - Deputy Supervisor/Police Chief: William Renye
  - Superintendent: Dennis Liimatta
  - Clerk: Dave Robertson

Area
  - Total: 32.7 sq mi (84.8 km^{2})
  - Land: 32.6 sq mi (84.5 km^{2})
  - Water: 0.12 sq mi (0.3 km^{2}) 0.37%
- Elevation: 846 ft (258 m)

Population (2020)
  - Total: 39,846
  - Density: 1,220/sq mi (472/km^{2})
- Time zone: UTC-5 (EST)
  - Summer (DST): UTC-4 (EDT)
- ZIP code(s): 48439 (Grand Blanc); 48507 (Flint); 48442 (Holly)
- Area code: 810
- FIPS code: 26-33300
- GNIS feature ID: 1626368
- Website: www.grandblanctwpmi.gov

Grand Blanc Township is a charter township of Genesee County in the U.S. state of Michigan. The population was 39,846 at the 2020 census, a slight increase from 37,508 at the 2010 census. The city of Grand Blanc was formed out of part of the township's survey area. The Charter Township is the largest suburb of Flint.

== Communities ==
- Whigville, also known as Gibsonville, is an unincorporated community as designated by the posted signs in the Township along Hill Road, Dort Highway and Saginaw Street.

== History ==
Originally settled by Chippewa Indians, the township took its name—French for "Great white"—from French traders who arrived before 1800. Afterwards, pioneer families began settling in the township. Jacob Stevens settled at the survey township center and future city with his family in 1823. Stony Run post office was formed in the area when it was in Oakland County on June 6, 1934, with Marston W. Richards as the first postmaster.

The oldest unit of government in Genesee County, Grand Blanc Township was organized on March 9, 1833, by the Territory of Michigan. Then the township included the survey area of the future townships of Atlas, Burton, Davison, Fenton, Flint, Genesee, Mount Morris and Mundy. With the March 2, 1836 formation of Flint Township, Grand Blanc lost in addition the township survey areas of Burton, Genesee and Mount Morris to Flint. With the July 26, 1836 organization of Argentine Township, Grand Blanc lost Fenton to the new township. Mundy was split off on its March 11, 1837 organization. By March 1843, Atlas and Davison had been organized.

The township center began to boom in 1864 with the arrival of the railroad (now known as the CSX Saginaw Subdivision). On June 3, 1878, the Stony Run post office was closed then reopened on December 10, 1878, operating only to October 23, 1879.

Grand Blanc Centre incorporated as the City of Grand Blanc in 1930. In 1939, the township and the city started a joint fire department. In the 1970s, the Grand Blanc city, township and school district formed a joint parks and recreation department under a commission with 2 members from each entity.

From 1958 to 2009, the Buick Open, a golf tournament on the PGA Tour was held at Warwick Hills Golf and Country Club in Grand Blanc Township. This was later replaced by the Ally Challenge which started in 2018.

An effort to consolidate the city and township into a single political entity was rejected by voters in both the city and township on May 2, 2006. In 2014, the superintendent left and the supervisor Micki Hoffman took over day-to-day management.

On January 20, 2019, the Township Board voted to rescind its joint fire department agreement in 90 days unless a new agreement is reached. the city decided to start up their own department starting July 25, 2019. Previously, the joint department was funded by each municipal levying a special levy of .5 mil for the department and designating .5 mill of general levy to the department.

After look at the lack of management knowledge on the parks and recreation commission in the spring of 2019, the township and city decided to dissolve the commission. In January 2020, the decision was formalized in January 2020 with the township taking over the department to provide services to both municipalities. The commission's executive director resigned that month and a replacement also was hired and left the post of department director.

At the June 23, 2020 board meeting, the board voted 5 to 2 to terminate superintendent Dennis Liimatta. After failing to have a quorum at a special meeting on July 1 to address day-to-day operations given the vacancy, supervisor Scott Bennett has used his statutory authority to appointed a deputy supervisor, Police Chief Ron Wiles. Voters removed all five (5) of the board members that voted to terminate the former Superintendent Dennis Liimatta, and he was rehired by the newly elected Board on December 14, 2020, after settling a whistleblowers lawsuit brought by Liimatta against the previous board members.

On September 28, 2025, a man rammed a vehicle through the front doors of The Church of Jesus Christ of Latter-day Saints in Grand Blanc Township. The man then exited the vehicle and opened fire, killing two people and injuring five others before setting the church on fire. Responding officers shot and killed the gunman. In addition to the gunshot casualties, two people died from the fire and a further three suffered from smoke inhalation.

== Geography ==
According to the United States Census Bureau, the township has a total area of 32.7 square miles (85 km^{2}), of which 32.6 square miles (84 km^{2}) is land and 0.1 square miles (0.26 km^{2}) (0.37%) is water. Thread Creek, a tributary of the Flint River, flows from south to north through the township.

== Demographics ==
As of the census of 2000, there were 29,827 people, 11,793 households, and 8,184 families residing in the township. The population density was 914.5 inhabitants per square mile (353.1/km^{2}). There were 12,450 housing units at an average density of 381.7 per square mile (147.4/km^{2}). The racial makeup of the township was 88.12% White, 6.70% African American, 0.39% Native American, 2.51% Asian, 0.02% Pacific Islander, 0.61% from other races, and 1.65% from two or more races. Hispanic or Latino of any race were 2.09% of the population.

There were 11,793 households, out of which 33.5% had children under the age of 18 living with them, 57.6% were married couples living together, 8.6% had a female householder with no husband present, and 30.6% were non-families. 25.2% of all households were made up of individuals, and 5.9% had someone living alone who was 65 years of age or older. The average household size was 2.50 and the average family size was 3.02.

In the township the population was spread out, with 25.5% under the age of 18, 7.8% from 18 to 24, 32.1% from 25 to 44, 23.8% from 45 to 64, and 10.7% who were 65 years of age or older. The median age was 36 years. For every 100 females, there were 95.7 males. For every 100 females age 18 and over, there were 92.0 males.

The median income for a household in the township was $61,458, and the median income for a family was $68,220. Males had a median income of $51,974 versus $34,311 for females. The per capita income for the township was $27,510. About 2.6% of families and 4.2% of the population were below the poverty line, including 3.0% of those under age 18 and 7.7% of those age 65 or over.

== Government ==
Grand Blanc is a charter township with a township board of trustee consisting of a supervisor, clerk, treasurer and four trustees. The board has appointed a superintendent as chief administrative officer, but with a vacancy, the supervisor has used his statuory authority to appointed a deputy supervisor.

The township government building is located in Whigville with the 48507 Flint zip code. Today, both the city and township governments cooperate to provide services for the community, including senior citizens' services, the Grand Blanc Heritage Museum, McFarlen Public Library. The Township's resident students are served primarily by the Grand Blanc Community Schools with small areas in the Goodrich Area Schools and Lake Fenton Community Schools.
