= List of NCAA Division I women's basketball career field-goal percentage leaders =

In basketball, field-goal percentage is the ratio of field goals made to field goals attempted. The top 25 highest career percentages in National Collegiate Athletic Association (NCAA) Division I women's basketball history are listed below. While the NCAA's current three-division format has been in place since the 1973–74 season, it did not sponsor women's sports until the 1981–82 school year; before that time, women's college sports were governed by the Association of Intercollegiate Athletics for Women (AIAW).

To be listed in the Division I record book, a player must have been active in at least three D-I seasons during the era in which the NCAA governed women's sports if she played four seasons in all, or two D-I seasons in a three-season career. However, for those players who qualify for inclusion in the record book, AIAW statistics are included. To qualify for career leaderboards, a player must have made at least 400 field goals in her college career.

No listed players have been enshrined in the Naismith Memorial Basketball Hall of Fame, but Ruth Riley and Kara Wolters have been enshrined in the Women's Basketball Hall of Fame.

Among the career top 25, only two have played at more than one school. Celena Taborn split her college career between Furman and Butler, and Liz Sherwood split hers between UConn and Vanderbilt. Monika Czinano (Note: Last name pronounced /sɪˈnɒnoʊ/; si-NON-oh) of Iowa, Mya Berkman of Liberty, Taborn, and the currently active Mackenzie Holmes of Indiana are the only players among the top 25 to have played in more than four college seasons. All benefited from the NCAA's decision not to count the 2020–21 season, extensively impacted by COVID-19, against the eligibility of any basketball player.

Six programs have placed more than one player in the top 25. UConn has three in all, with Sherwood joined by all-time leader Tamika Williams and Wolters, who played their entire college careers at UConn. Five programs have two each: Georgia Southern (Regina Days and Trina Roberts), Iowa (Czinano and Megan Gustafson), Maryland (Crystal Langhorne and Brionna Jones), Tennessee Tech (Renay Adams and Roschelle Vaughn), and Vanderbilt (Chantelle Anderson and Sherwood).

== Key ==
^	Player still competing in NCAA Division I (Note: Defined here as being eligible to play in the 2023–24 season.)
C	Player was active in the 2020–21 season, benefiting from the NCAA's blanket COVID-19 eligibility waiver
†	Elected to the Women's Basketball Hall of Fame
*	Elected to the Naismith Memorial Basketball Hall of Fame
Team (X)	Denotes the number of times a player from that team appears on the list

== Top 25 career field-goal percentage leaders ==
Current through the 2022–23 season.

Player	Team	Career start	Career end	Games played	Total field goals made	Total field goals attempted	Percentage	Ref. (Note: Except as otherwise noted, references for each entry are cited in the "General references" section below.)
Tamika Williams	UConn	1998	2002	132	560	797	70.3	
Deneka Knowles	Southeastern Louisiana	1992	1996	106	578	849	68.1	
Carolyn Swords	Boston College	2007	2011	133	850	1,207	67.6	
Lidiya Varbanova	Boise State	1990	1994	107	754	1,119	67.4	
Monika Czinano^{C}	Iowa	2018	2023	162	1,031	1,537	67.1	
Megan Gustafson	Iowa (2)	2015	2018	135	1,136	1,731	65.6	
Crystal Langhorne	Maryland	2004	2008	135	889	1,363	65.2	
Regina Days	Georgia Southern	1984	1988	111	835	1,282	65.1	
Ruthy Hebard	Oregon	2016	2020	144	987	1,516	65.1	
Chantelle Anderson	Vanderbilt	1999	2003	137	1,020	1,568	65.1	
Brionna Jones	Maryland (2)	2013	2017	142	803	1,236	65.0	
Kelly Lyons	Old Dominion	1986	1990	122	887	1,373	64.6	
Renay Adams	Tennessee Tech	1987	1991	120	600	931	64.4	
Mya Berkman^{C}	Liberty	2018	2023	154	580	900	64.4	
Celena Taborn^{C}	Furman / Butler	2017	2022 (Note: Taborn played four seasons at Furman and took advantage of the COVID-19 eligibility waiver to transfer to Butler for her fifth and final college season.)	143	793	1,233	64.3	
Angie Welle	Iowa State	1998	2002	132	791	1,234	64.1	
Kalani Brown	Baylor	2015	2018	147	884	1,384	63.9	
Barbara Farris	Tulane	1994	1998	118	660	1,036	63.7	
Liz Sherwood	UConn (2) / Vanderbilt (2)	2003	2008 (Note: Although Sherwood's career spanned five seasons, she only played in four. She transferred from UConn after the 2003–04 season, sat out the 2004–05 season due to then-current NCAA transfer rules, and played her final three seasons at Vanderbilt.)	124	506	795	63.6	
Mackenzie Holmes^ (Note: Holmes is eligible to return in the 2023–24 season due to the COVID-19 waiver.)	Indiana	2019	present	115	783	1,233	63.5	
Trina Roberts	Georgia Southern (2)	1980	1984	117	695	1,099	63.2	
Myndee Kay Larsen	Southern Utah	1994	1998	103	707	1,118	63.2	
Ruth Riley†	Notre Dame	1997	2001	131	777	1,229	63.2	
Tyish Hall	Duke	1993	1997	109	543	862	63.0	
Kara Wolters†	UConn (3)	1993	1997	137	947	1,507	62.8	
