= Francis Kalabat =

Catholic prelate

His Grace, The Most Reverend Francis Yohana Kalabat
- Eparch of Saint Thomas the Apostle of Detroit
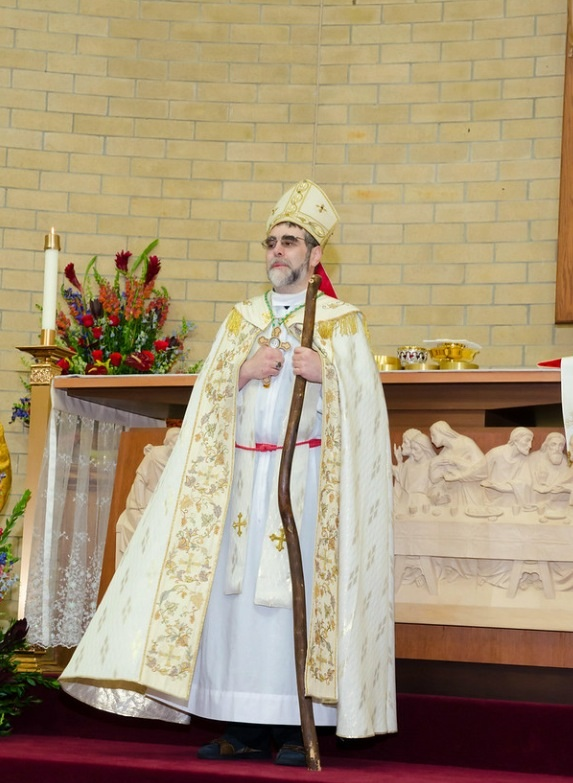
- Ordination of Bishop Francis Y. Kalabat (June 14, 2014)
- Church: Chaldean Catholic Church
- Diocese: Chaldean Catholic Eparchy of Saint Thomas the Apostle of Detroit
- Appointed: May 5, 2014
- Installed: June 14, 2014
- Predecessor: Ibrahim Namo Ibrahim
- Other post: Apostolic Administrator Chaldean Catholic Eparchy of Mar Addai of Toronto

Orders
- Ordination: July 5, 1995 by Ibrahim Namo Ibrahim
- Consecration: June 14, 2014 by Louis Raphaël I Sako, Allen Henry Vigneron and Ibrahim Namo Ibrahim

Personal details
- Born: May 13, 1970 (age 56) Kuwait City, Kuwait
- Denomination: Chaldean Catholic
- Motto: Blessed be the name of Jesus, both now and forever. Amen.

Styles of Francis Yohana Kalabat
- Reference style: His Grace; The Most Reverend
- Spoken style: His Grace
- Religious style: Eparch

Francis Yohana Kalabat (born May 13, 1970) is an Iraqi-American prelate who has served as Chaldean Catholic Eparch of Saint Thomas the Apostle of Detroit since 2014.

== Life ==
He began undergraduate (philosophy) studies at the University of San Diego's Saint Francis de Sales Center for Priestly Formation, in San Diego County, California. Subsequently, he began the requisite graduate theological training for the Chaldean Catholic priesthood at Sacred Heart Major Seminary, in Detroit, Michigan. Ordained a priest on July 5, 1995, he was appointed Parochial Vicar (Associate Pastor) of Mother of God Church in Southfield, Michigan, the city where the Eparchy has its cathedral. Since 2001, Eparch Kalabat has been Pastor of Saint Thomas Church in West Bloomfield, Director of Vocations for the Eparchy, and has been involved with the Center for Re-Evangelization. He speaks Arabic, English and Aramaic, and also knows Spanish. He received his episcopal ordination, and was installed as Eparch on June 14, 2014.

On August 9, 2017, Pope Francis named Kalabat as administrator of Eparchy of Addai of Toronto.

== See also ==
- Catholic Church hierarchy
- Catholic Church in the United States
- Historical list of the Catholic bishops of the United States
- List of Catholic bishops of the United States
- Lists of patriarchs, archbishops, and bishops

Catholic Church titles
Preceded by Ibrahim Namo Ibrahim	Eparch of Saint Thomas the Apostle of Detroit; 2014-Present	Succeeded by Incumbent
