= Goodrich, Michigan =

- Village
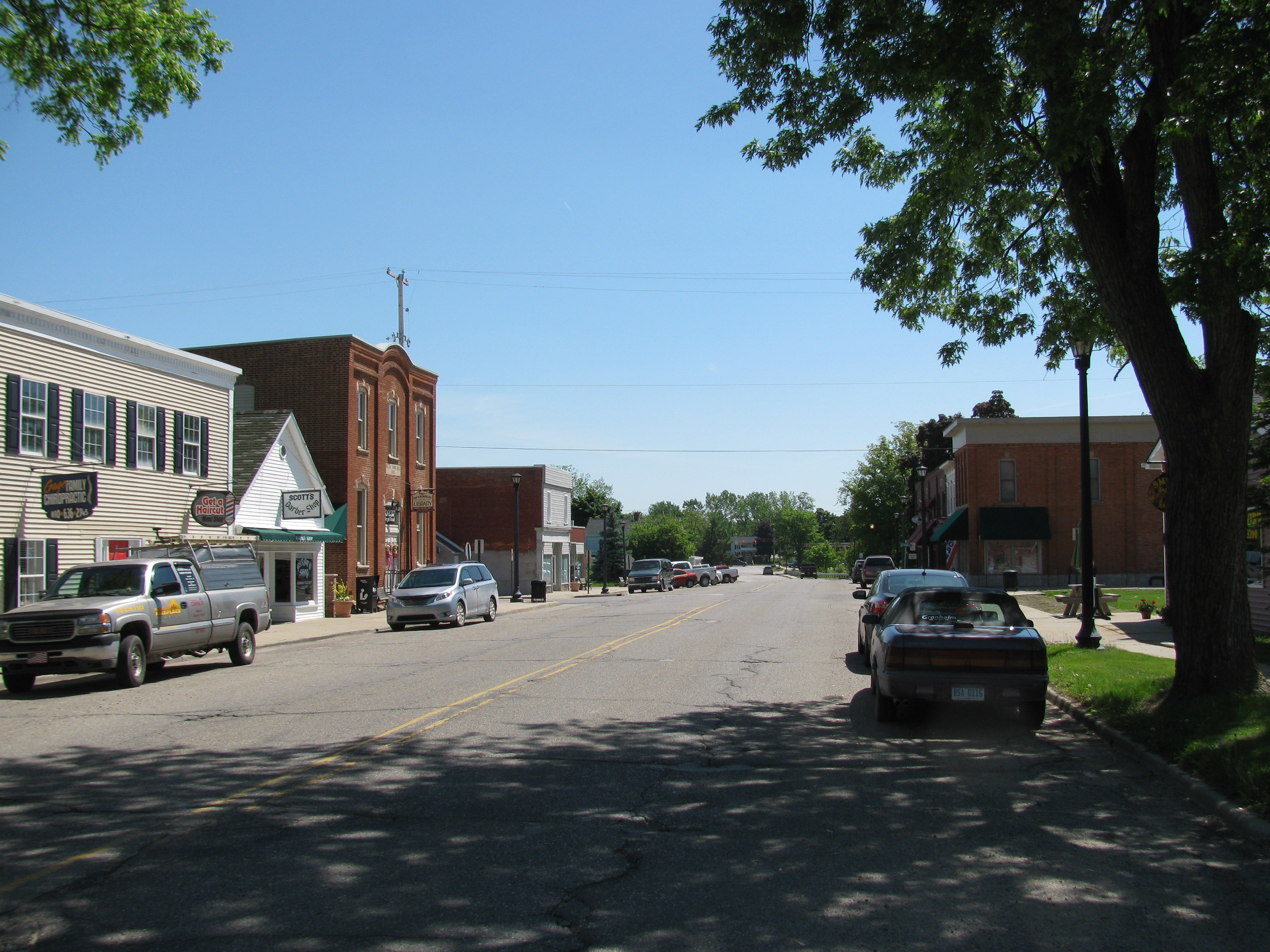
- Looking east along Hegel Road

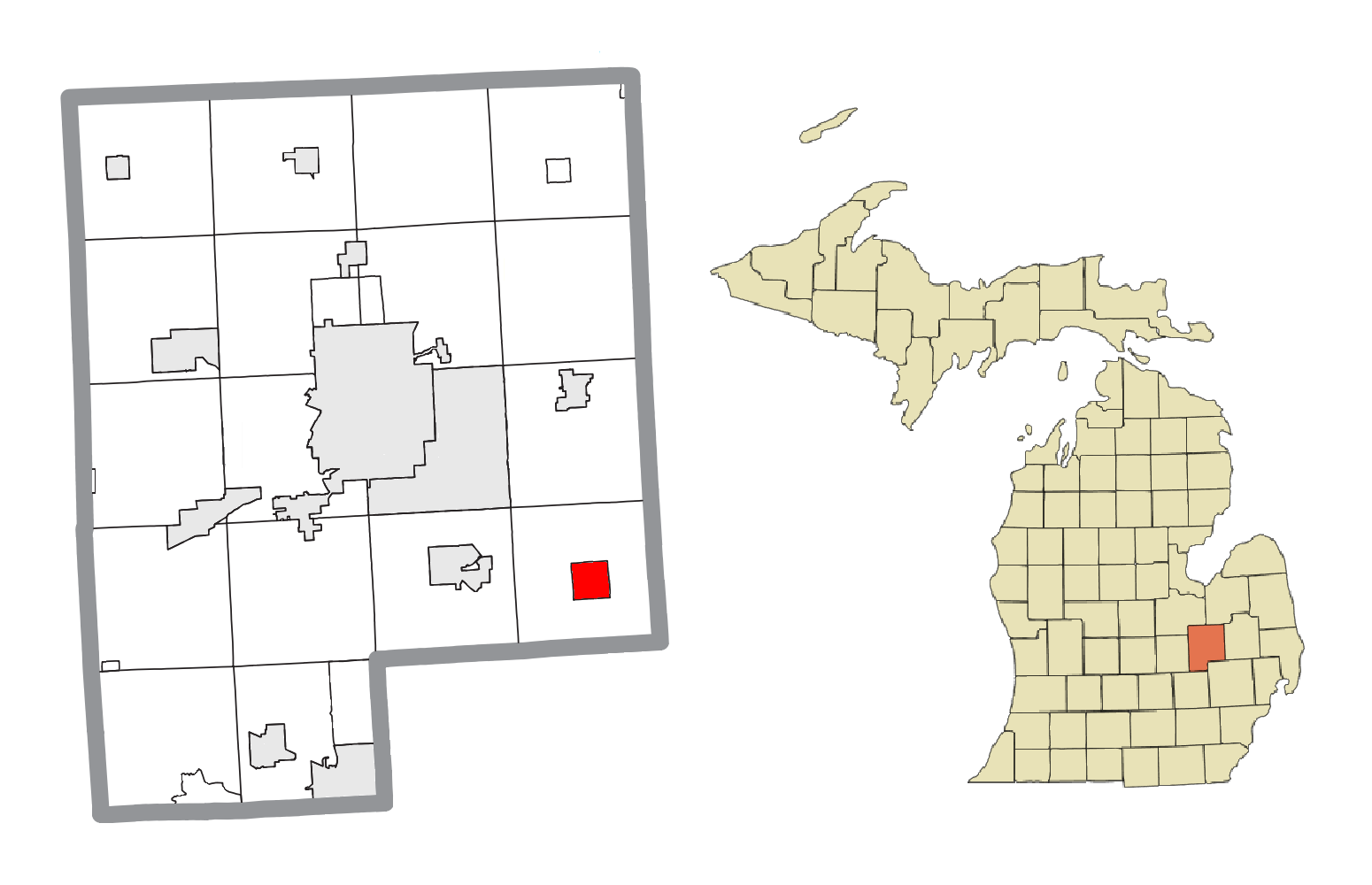
- Location within Genesee County

- Location within the state of Michigan
- Coordinates: 42°55′01″N 83°30′23″W
- Country: United States
- State: Michigan
- County: Genesee
- Township: Atlas
- Settled: 1835
- Incorporated: 1957

Government
  - Type: Village council
  - President: Shannon McCafferty

Area
  - Total: 2.27 sq mi (5.87 km^{2})
  - Land: 2.20 sq mi (5.69 km^{2})
  - Water: 0.073 sq mi (0.19 km^{2}) 3.10%
- Elevation: 873 ft (266 m)

Population (2020)
  - Total: 2,022
  - Density: 921.1/sq mi (355.63/km^{2})
- Time zone: UTC-5 (EST)
  - Summer (DST): UTC-4 (EDT)
- ZIP code(s): 48438
- Area code: 810
- FIPS code: 26-32980
- GNIS feature ID: 0626948
- Website: www.villageofgoodrich.com

Goodrich is a village in Genesee County in the U.S. state of Michigan. As of the 2020 census, its population was 2,022. The village is located within Atlas Township and is part of the Flint metropolitan area.

== Geography ==
According to the United States Census Bureau, the village has a total area of 2.26 square miles (5.85 km^{2}), of which 2.19 square miles (5.67 km^{2}) is land and 0.07 square miles (0.18 km^{2}) is water.

== Demographics ==
Historical population
| Census | Pop. | Note | %± |
|---|---|---|---|
| 1880 | 235 | | — |
| 1960 | 701 | | — |
| 1970 | 774 | | 10.4% |
| 1980 | 795 | | 2.7% |
| 1990 | 916 | | 15.2% |
| 2000 | 1,353 | | 47.7% |
| 2010 | 1,860 | | 37.5% |
| 2020 | 2,022 | | 8.7% |
U.S. Decennial Census

=== 2020 census ===
As of the 2020 census, Goodrich had a population of 2,022. The median age was 40.4 years. 25.0% of residents were under the age of 18 and 14.5% of residents were 65 years of age or older. For every 100 females there were 95.0 males, and for every 100 females age 18 and over there were 94.4 males age 18 and over.

0.0% of residents lived in urban areas, while 100.0% lived in rural areas.

There were 718 households in Goodrich, of which 39.6% had children under the age of 18 living in them. Of all households, 57.4% were married-couple households, 13.4% were households with a male householder and no spouse or partner present, and 22.7% were households with a female householder and no spouse or partner present. About 20.6% of all households were made up of individuals and 9.6% had someone living alone who was 65 years of age or older.

There were 742 housing units, of which 3.2% were vacant. The homeowner vacancy rate was 0.3% and the rental vacancy rate was 6.5%.

Racial composition as of the 2020 census
| Race | Number | Percent |
|---|---|---|
| White | 1,857 | 91.8% |
| Black or African American | 25 | 1.2% |
| American Indian and Alaska Native | 6 | 0.3% |
| Asian | 0 | 0.0% |
| Native Hawaiian and Other Pacific Islander | 1 | 0.0% |
| Some other race | 14 | 0.7% |
| Two or more races | 119 | 5.9% |
| Hispanic or Latino (of any race) | 60 | 3.0% |

=== 2010 census ===
As of the census of 2010, there were 1,860 people, 648 households, and 484 families living in the village. The population density was 849.3 inhabitants per square mile (327.9/km^{2}). There were 692 housing units at an average density of 316.0 per square mile (122.0/km^{2}). The racial makeup of the village was 98.1% White, 0.9% African American, 0.2% Native American, 0.2% Asian, 0.2% from other races, and 0.5% from two or more races. Hispanic or Latino of any race were 2.2% of the population.

There were 648 households, of which 45.1% had children under the age of 18 living with them, 59.9% were married couples living together, 9.7% had a female householder with no husband present, 5.1% had a male householder with no wife present, and 25.3% were non-families. 21.0% of all households were made up of individuals and 8.8% had someone living alone who was 65 years of age or older. The average household size was 2.83 and the average family size was 3.33.

The median age in the village was 36.9 years. 32.6% of residents were under the age of 18; 5.6% were between the ages of 18 and 24; 27% were from 25 to 44; 24.5% were from 45 to 64; and 10.3% were 65 years of age or older. The gender makeup of the village was 49.7% male and 50.3% female.

=== 2000 census ===
As of the census of 2000, there were 1,353 people, 494 households, and 385 families living in the village. The population density was 576.3 inhabitants per square mile (222.5/km^{2}). There were 526 housing units at an average density of 224.0 per square mile (86.5/km^{2}). The racial makeup of the village was 98.52% White, 0.22% African American, 0.15% Native American, 0.59% Asian, 0.07% from other races, and 0.44% from two or more races. Hispanic or Latino of any race were 1.03% of the population.

There were 494 households, of which 44.3% had children under the age of 18 living with them, 66.6% were married couples living together, 8.7% had a female householder with no husband present, and 21.9% were non-families. 20.6% of all households were made up of individuals and 5.7% had someone living alone who was 65 years of age or older. The average household size was 2.70 and the average family size was 3.12.

In the village, the population was spread out, with 29.6% under the age of 18, 5.5% from 18 to 24, 35.0% from 25 to 44, 21.5% from 45 to 64, and 8.5% who were 65 years of age or older. The median age was 35 years. For every 100 females, there were 101.6 males. For every 100 females age 18 and over, there were 99.4 males.

The median income for a household in the village was $65,089, and the median income for a family was $74,063. Males had a median income of $55,000 versus $31,641 for females. The per capita income for the village was $26,089. About 1.6% of families and 2.7% of the population were below the poverty line, including 1.0% of those under age 18 and 6.3% of those age 65 or over.

== History ==
John Goodrich traveled via steam ship from Buffalo, New York to Detroit to settle after they had sold their home in the summer of 1835. They journeyed from Detroit towards modern-day Pontiac, where they met land explorers who told them of the land's beauty. When they reached the vicinity of Davison's Mill (now Atlas), they found rich, fertile soil, an excess of timber, and readily available water. They returned to Detroit and purchased one thousand acres (4 km^{2}) at $1.25 per acre. They returned to their old home in Clarence, New York and prepared to return to their purchased property. It was decided that John Goodrich would travel back via Canada. They completed their journey in 16 days, and built a cabin before the family arrived on May 20, 1836. The first wood-frame house was built for John Goodrich in 1838.

The first tavern, The Goodrich House, was built in 1866 by a Mr. Matthew Davidson. This was a popular spot for trading and salesman. In over one hundred years, there were several owners. The house fell victim to a fire in 2009 and was subsequently torn down.

== See also ==
- Goodrich Area Schools
