= Atlas Township, Michigan =

- Civil township
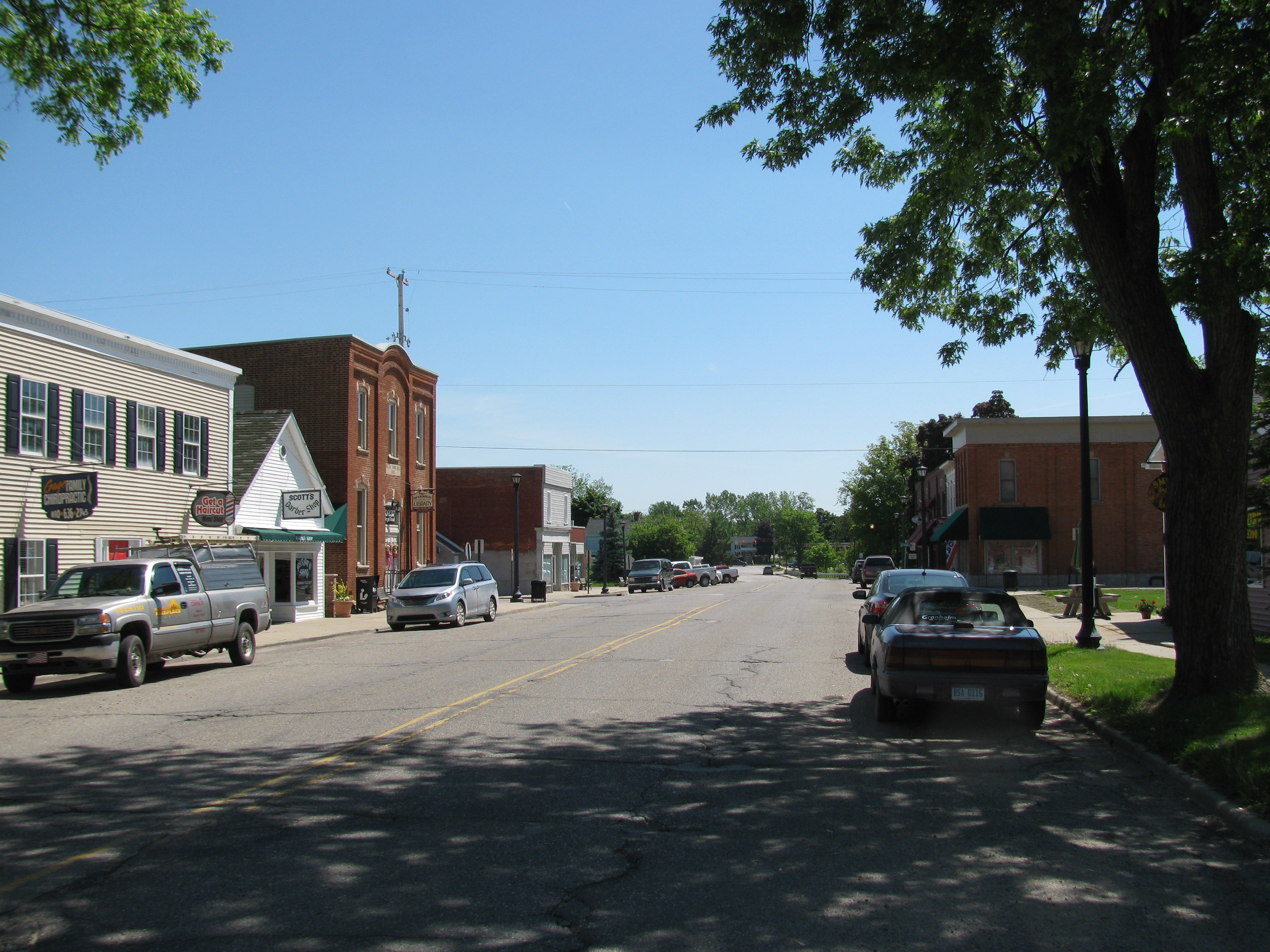
- Village of Goodrich within Atlas Township

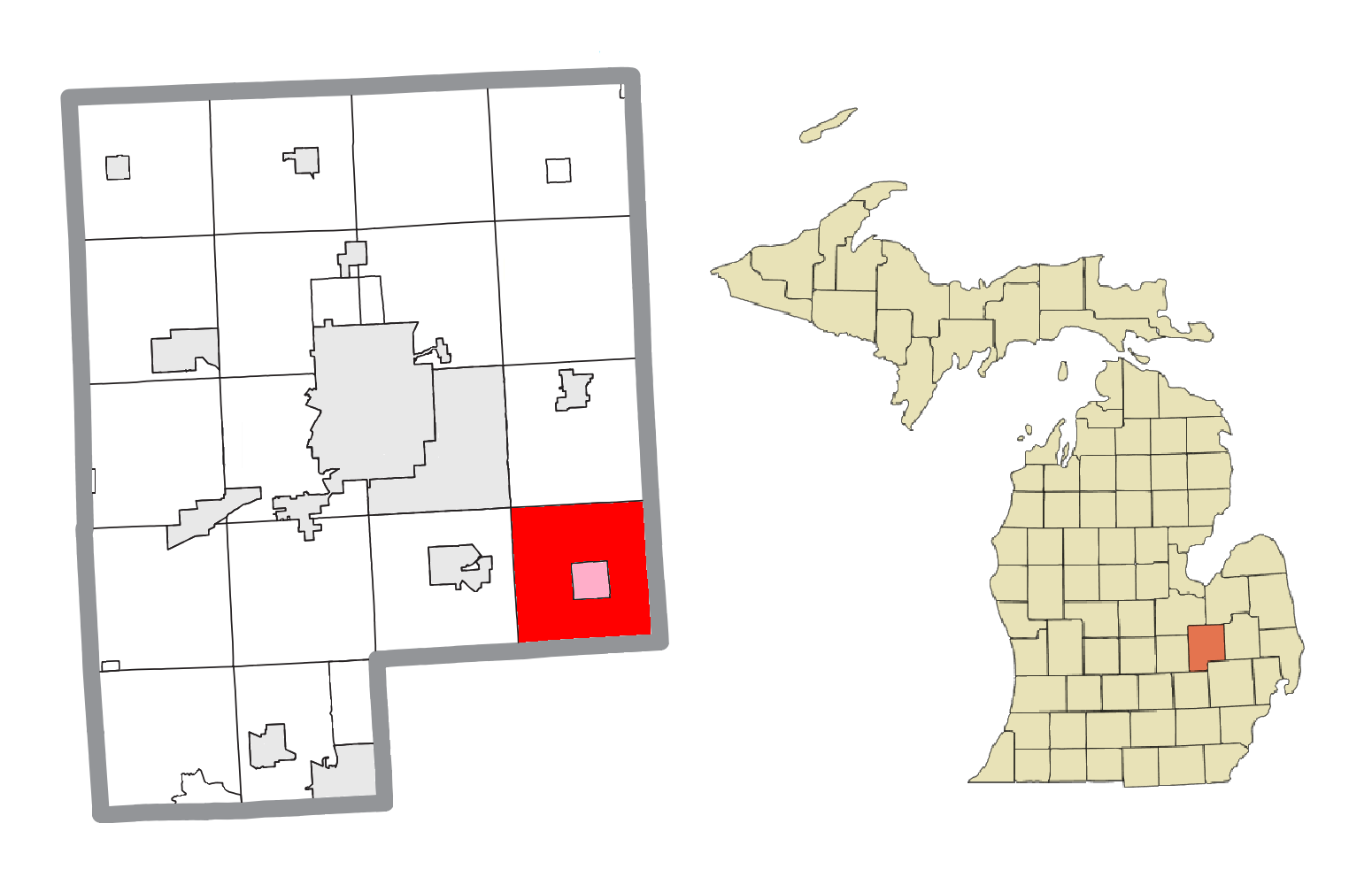
- Location within Genesee County (red) and the administered village of Goodrich (pink)

- Location within the state of Michigan Location within the United States
- Coordinates: 42°55′14″N 83°30′34″W
- Country: United States
- State: Michigan
- County: Genesee
- Settled: 1831
- Organized: 1836

Government
  - Supervisor: Jim Busch
  - Clerk: Toni A. Yaklin

Area
  - Total: 36.0 sq mi (93.2 km^{2})
  - Land: 35.4 sq mi (91.6 km^{2})
  - Water: 0.62 sq mi (1.6 km^{2})
- Elevation: 846 ft (258 m)

Population (2020)
  - Total: 8,352
  - Density: 236/sq mi (91.2/km^{2})
- Time zone: UTC-5 (EST)
  - Summer (DST): UTC-4 (EDT)
- ZIP code(s): 48411 (Atlas); 48423 (Davison); 48438 (Goodrich); 48439 (Grand Blanc)
- Area code: 810
- FIPS code: 26-04000
- GNIS feature ID: 1625857
- Website: Official website

Atlas Township is a civil township of Genesee County in the U.S. state of Michigan. As of the 2020 census, the township population was 8,352, up from 7,993 at the 2010 census.

== Communities ==
- Atlas is an unincorporated community in the township, about ten miles (16 km) southeast of Flint and about a mile north of Goodrich at 42°56′16″N 83°32′04″W. The ZIP code is 48411 and the elevation is 846 feet (258 m) above sea level. Its first postmaster was Norman Davison when Davisonville in 1837 was within Lapeer County in Michigan Territory. It was formerly known as Davisonville in 1873, while the post office was known as Atlas.
- The Village of Goodrich is at the center of the township. The ZIP code is 48438.
- The northeast corner of the township is considered to be part of the Flint suburban area.
- Kipp Corners is an unincorporated community in the township south of Kipp Road on M-15 and Horton Road.

== History ==
Atlas Township was organized in 1836 as part of Lapeer County, and was one of the earliest townships in this region to receive settlers. The first settler was Asa Farrar, who, in September, 1839, purchased land on section 18 and built a log house upon it the same year. He was a brother of Pearson Farrar, who settled the same year in Grand Blanc upon an adjacent section. They came from Monroe County, New York. The first birth and the first marriage in the township occurred in Asa Farrar's family, respectively, in 1833 and 1834.

In 1831, Norman Davison settled on the banks of Kearsley Creek in section 8 starting the Davisonville settlement. Soon, the settlement was the center of the township's development. The mills were built in 1833 (saw-mill) and 1836 (grist-mill).

Goodrich was started in September 1835 with Moses and Enos Goodrich purchasing over one thousand acres near the center of the township and building a log cabin before fetching their family. The township was detached from Lapeer County and added to Genesee County in 1843.

On October 9, 1862, a post office was opened at Kipps Corner and lasted until closed on November 6, 1871.

In 2024, Atlas Township was hit by a strong tornado, which was ultimately rated EF3. It ended up snapping multiple trees, blowing two garage doors out and stripping a roof partially off of a home. The tornado reached peaked intensity as it continued into an industrial complex, blowing out walls and inflicting significant roof loss. After exiting the industrial complex, the tornado snapped or uprooted pine trees before lifting.

== Geography ==
According to the United States Census Bureau, the township has a total area of 36.0 square miles (93 km^{2}), of which 35.4 square miles (92 km^{2}) is land and 0.6 square miles (1.6 km^{2}) (1.67%) is water.

== Demographics ==
Historical population
Census	Pop.	Note	%±
1960	2,210		—
1970	3,089		39.8%
1980	4,891		58.3%
1990	5,551		13.5%
2000	7,257		30.7%
2010	7,993		10.1%
2020	8,352		4.5%
Source: Census Bureau. Census 1960- 2000, 2010.

As of the census of 2000, there were 7,257 people, 2,442 households, and 2,053 families residing in the township. The population density was 205.2 inhabitants per square mile (79.2/km^{2}). There were 2,554 housing units at an average density of 72.2 per square mile (27.9/km^{2}). The racial makeup of the township was 97.56% White, 0.33% African American, 0.32% Native American, 0.51% Asian, 0.12% Pacific Islander, 0.25% from other races, and 0.91% from two or more races. Hispanic or Latino of any race were 1.07% of the population.

There were 2,442 households, out of which 44.5% had children under the age of 18 living with them, 76.3% were married couples living together, 5.1% had a female householder with no husband present, and 15.9% were non-families. 13.3% of all households were made up of individuals, and 3.8% had someone living alone who was 65 years of age or older. The average household size was 2.94 and the average family size was 3.24.

In the township the population was spread out, with 29.7% under the age of 18, 5.6% from 18 to 24, 31.8% from 25 to 44, 26.2% from 45 to 64, and 6.8% who were 65 years of age or older. The median age was 37 years. For every 100 females, there were 106.7 males. For every 100 females age 18 and over, there were 103.6 males.

The median income for a household in the township was $73,720, and the median income for a family was $78,349. Males had a median income of $59,213 versus $32,156 for females. The per capita income for the township was $27,960. About 2.6% of families and 4.0% of the population were below the poverty line, including 3.2% of those under age 18 and 5.1% of those age 65 or over.
