= Geena Gall =

American middle-distance runner

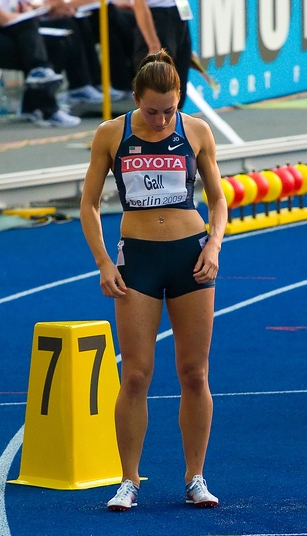
- Gall at the 2009 World Championships

Personal information
- Born: January 18, 1987 (age 39) Flint, Michigan, United States

Sport
- Country: United States
- Sport: Track
- Events: Sprints, Middle

Achievements and titles
- Personal bests: 400 m: 55.48 (Ann Arbor 2009); 800 m: 1:59.24 (Eugene 2012); 1500 m: 4:09.95 (Victoria 2013); Indoors; 600 m: 1:29.43i (Ann Arbor 2008); 1000 m: 2:42.66i (Boston 2015); Mile: 4:31.75i (Seattle 2013)
- Updated on May 27, 2024

Geena Gall (born January 18, 1987), is an Olympic American mid-distance runner who ran for the University of Michigan. Gall's achievements include back to back NCAA Outdoor Championships in the 800m in 2008 and 2009, representing the USA at the 2012 Olympic Games in London and 2009 World Championships in Athletics in Berlin, Germany in the 800m. She also competed at the North American Central American Caribbean Championships in San Salvador, El Salvador in 2007 (3rd place) and Toluca, Mexico in 2008 (1st place). Gall was a member of the "Fab Four" who set two collegiate records (4 x 800, and 4 x 1500) at the 2007 Penn Relays, a ten-time NCAA All-American, owning two Big Ten 800 meter records and two DMR records, 10 Big Ten championships, numerous U of M school records, and at Grand Blanc High School she was a three-time national champion.

== Prep ==
Gall was born in Flint, Michigan. As a freshman at Grand Blanc High School she played on the varsity basketball team and started at point guard. During an AAU basketball game, Gall tore her ACL and could not run outdoor track. As a sophomore, Gall again started at point guard for GBHS and led the team to a conference championship. During the indoor track season, Gall qualified for the 400m at the indoor state meet, but false started and was disqualified. During the outdoor season, she ran the 400m and came in 6th place. As a junior, Gall played her on the basketball team which won the Conference and District championship. During the indoor track season, she won the indoor state meet in the 800m, and went on to win her first high school national championship in the 800m at Nike Indoor Nationals. Outdoor, Gall won the Michigan state meet 800m, and was second at Adidas Outdoor Nationals. Senior year, Gall stopped playing basketball to focus on her running career. During the indoor season, Gall won the state meet in a record time of 2:08.77, and won the 800m for the second time at the Nike Indoor Nationals, beating Sarah Bowman. Outdoor, Gall set the conference record in a time of 2:07.90, won the state meet, Midwest Meet of Champions, and the Nike Outdoor National meet, in a personal best time of 2:05.05.

=== High School State Meet ===
Year	Indoor	Outdoor
2001 (Freshman)	Did not compete	Did not compete
2002 (Sophomore)	400m DQ	400m 6th
2003 (Junior)	800m 1st	800m 1st
2004 (Senior)	800m 1st	800m 1st

== University of Michigan ==
Gall won the 2009 Outdoor NCAA D1 Championship to repeat as the 800 meter champion in 2:00.80. Gall also won the 2008 Outdoor NCAA Division One 800 meter title. Gall was a member of the cross country and track and field teams from 2005 - 2009 where the 10-time NCAA All-American earned national acclaim. Gall earned USTFCCCA national honors as Ten-time NCAA Division I All-American.

=== Personal Records ===
Collegiate Records	Time	Event
Collegiate 4 x 800	8:18.78	Penn Relays
Collegiate 4 x 1500	17:52.62	Penn Relays
Big Ten Indoor 800m	2:04.7	Big Ten Championships
Big Ten Outdoor 800m	2:02.73	Big Ten Championships
Big Ten Distance Medley Relay	11:19.68	Big Ten Championships

== Professional ==
2009 World Championship
Gall finished in 2:01.30 to finish 6th in semifinal heat.

2012 London Olympics

Gall broke her personal record in the 800m at the 2012 Prefontaine Classic, finishing behind Alysia Montaño in a time of 1:59.28 and then broke it again at the USA Track and Field Olympic Trials, finishing second to Alysia Montaño once again, in a time of 1:59.24, having made a late charge on the home stretch. She represented Team USA in the 800-meter event alongside Alysia Montano (1:59.08) and Alice Schmidt (1:59.46). At the Olympics she reached the semi-finals, finishing in 3rd place in her semifinal.

2013 Des Moines USATF Championship
Gall finished 8th at USA Outdoors in 2:04.07 in 95 degree temperature. Gall showed glimpse of top form at Occidental College in May running 2:01.11. Gall is now being coached by Mike McGuire (University of Michigan).

2015 Boston USATF Championship
Geena finished 8th in 1000 meters.

=== Competition record ===
Year	Competition	Venue	Position	Event	Notes
2014	World Relay Championships	Nassau, Bahamas	1st	4 × 800 m relay	8:01.58

Professional Records	Time	Event
800m	1:59.24	2012 US Olympic Trials
1500m	4:09.95	Victoria Track Classic
Mile	4:31.4	Husky Classic- UW

Gall served as a volunteer coach since 2016 at UCLA Bruins.
