= Megan DiLeo =

American basketball player (born 1996)

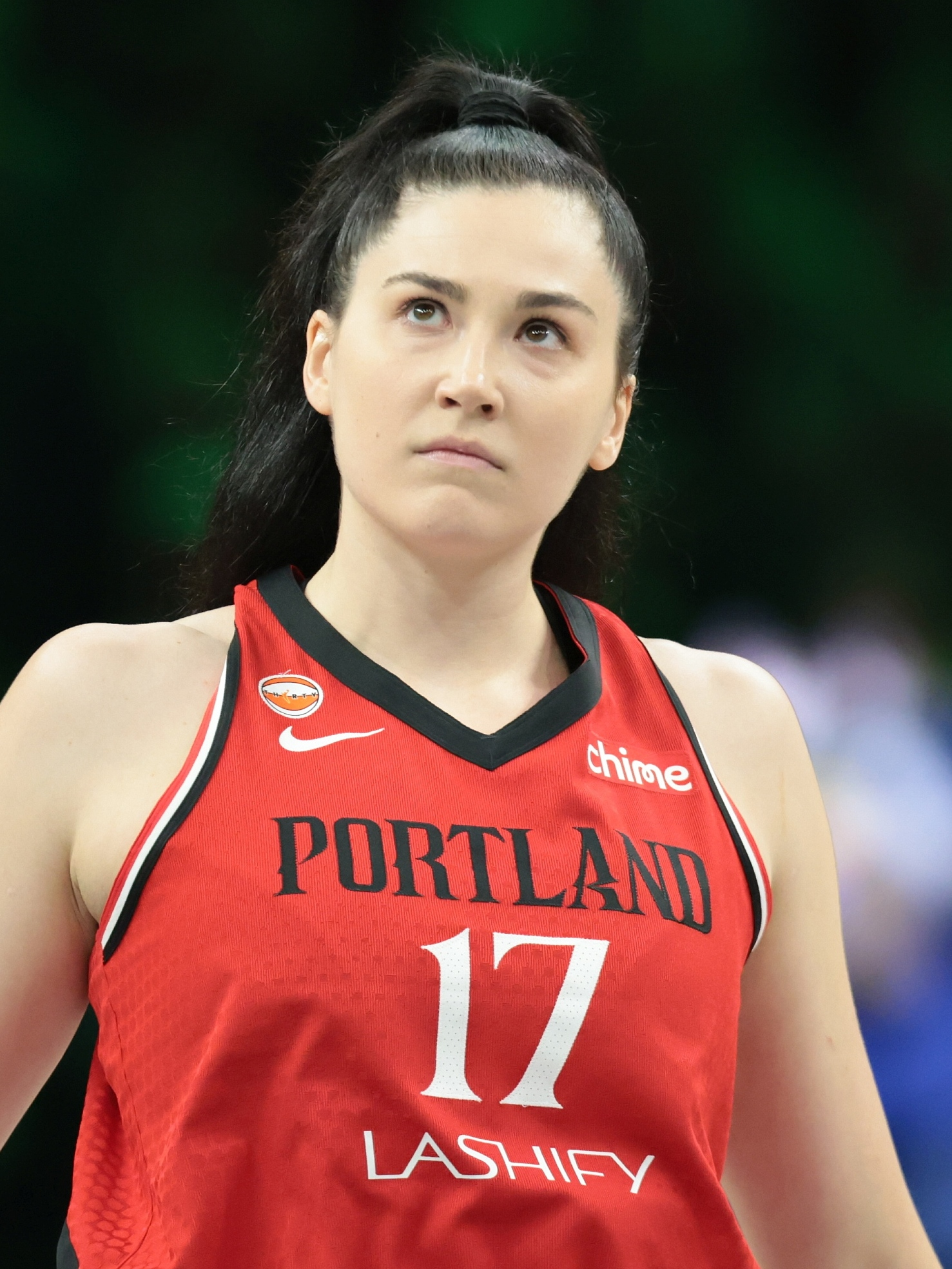
- DiLeo with the Portland Fire in 2026

No. 17 – Portland Fire
- Position: Power forward / center
- League: WNBA

Personal information
- Born: December 13, 1996 (age 29) Madison, Wisconsin, U.S.
- Listed height: 1.93 m (6 ft 4 in)
- Listed weight: 94.3 kg (208 lb)

Career information
- High school: South Shore (Port Wing, Wisconsin)
- College: Iowa (2015–2019)
- WNBA draft: 2019: 2nd round, 17th overall pick
- Drafted by: Dallas Wings
- Playing career: 2019–present

Career history
- 2019–2020: Dallas Wings
- 2021: Washington Mystics
- 2021–2023: Phoenix Mercury
- 2022–2023: Olympiacos Piraeus
- 2023–2024: London Lions
- 2024–2025: Las Vegas Aces
- 2025: Fenerbahçe
- 2026–present: Portland Fire

Career highlights
- WNBA champion (2025); EuroCup champion (2024); Greek League champion (2022–23); Turkish Presidential Cup champion (2025); Naismith College Player of the Year (2019); AP Player of the Year (2019); ESPNW National Player of the Year (2019); USBWA National Player of the Year (2019); Honda Sports Award (2019); Lisa Leslie Award (2019); Senior CLASS Award (2019); Big Ten tournament MOP (2019); WBCA Coaches' All-American (2019); First-team All-American – AP, USBWA, ESPNW (2019); Big Ten All-Defensive Team (2019); All-American – USBWA (2018); Second-team All-American – AP (2018); Big Ten Female Athlete of the Year (2019); 2× Big Ten Player of the Year (2018, 2019); Big Ten Tournament MOP (2019); 3× First-team All-Big Ten (2017–2019); Big Ten All-Freshman Team (2016); No. 10 retired by Iowa Hawkeyes; 2× NCAA season scoring leader (2018, 2019)
- Stats at Basketball Reference

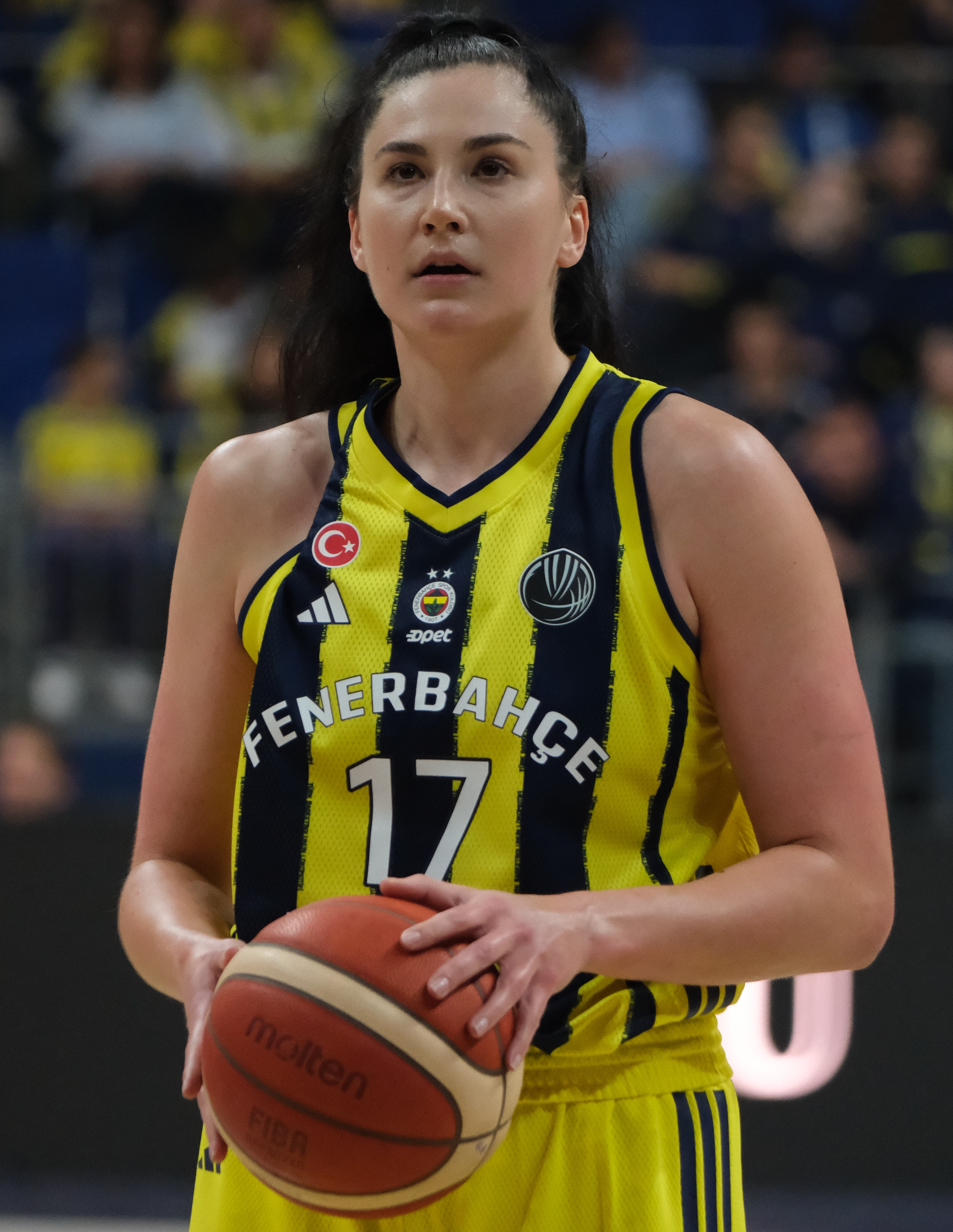

Megan Elizabeth DiLeo (born Gustafson on December 13, 1996) is a professional basketball player for the Portland Fire of the Women's National Basketball Association (WNBA). Born in the United States, she represents Spain at the international level and made her Olympic debut in 2024 playing for Spain at the 2024 Summer Olympics.

== Early life ==
DiLeo is from Port Wing, Wisconsin on the shores of Lake Superior and played for South Shore High School. She is the all-time leading scorer in Wisconsin High School Girls Basketball.

== College career ==
DiLeo completed her college career with the Iowa Hawkeyes in 2019. As a senior, she scored 1000 points that year and won the Honda Sports Award as the nation's top female basketball player. On 15 March 2019, ESPN named her the national player of the year. In 2018 and 2019, she was named the Big Ten Conference Women's Basketball Player of the Year. On January 26, 2020, Iowa retired the number 10 in her honor.

== Professional career ==
=== WNBA ===
She was drafted in the second round (17th overall) by the Dallas Wings in the 2019 WNBA draft, but was released before the start of the season. On June 10, 2019, Gustafson was signed again by the team.

The Washington Mystics signed Gustafson during the 2021 season, where she would see a significant increase in minutes played per game. Her play earned her a two-year deal with the Phoenix Mercury for the 2022 season, where she would become an integral part of the playoff-bound team, including regular double digit minutes and her first double-double performance against the Las Vegas Aces. In her first career playoff appearance, Gustafson came off the bench and played a significant 21 minutes, scoring 12 points and collecting 4 rebounds in a Game 1 loss to the Aces.

On February 2, 2024, DiLeo was announced to be joining the Las Vegas Aces for the 2024 WNBA season. After an injury kept her out for the first half of the WNBA season, DiLeo played a role off the bench in the Aces second half surge that ended with the 2025 WNBA Finals championship. In Game 3 of the finals, with the game tied at 88-88 and 20 seconds left, she came up with a key defensive stop with a partial block and rebound that allowed A’Ja Wilson to hit a game-winner with less than a second left. The Aces would go on to sweep the series.

On April 12, 2026, the expansion Portland Fire announced that she had signed a two-year contract with the team and would be a part of their inaugural roster.

=== EuroLeague ===
DiLeo signed for the London Lions in August 2023 ahead of the Euro season. Helping them secure victory in the Betty Codona WBBL final against the Essex Rebels, she was awarded finals MVP.

== Career statistics ==
Legend
GP	Games played	GS	Games started	MPG	Minutes per game	FG%	Field goal percentage	3P%	3-point field goal percentage
FT%	Free throw percentage	RPG	Rebounds per game	APG	Assists per game	SPG	Steals per game	BPG	Blocks per game
TO	Turnovers per game	PPG	Points per game	**Bold**	Career high	*	Led Division I

Denotes seasons in which Gustafson won the EuroCup

=== WNBA ===
==== Regular season ====
Stats current through end of 2025 season

WNBA regular season statistics
Year	Team	GP	GS	MPG	FG%	3P%	FT%	RPG	APG	SPG	BPG	TO	PPG
2019	Dallas	25	0	9.5	.491	.111	**.900**	2.5	0.3	0.2	0.2	0.4	2.9
2020	Dallas	10	0	4.8	.286	.000	.667	1.1	0.1	0.0	0.1	**0.2**	1.4
2021	Washington	11	1	9.9	**.594**	.000	.667	3.6	0.0	0.2	0.1	0.8	4.0
2022	Phoenix	33	0	9.6	.549	**.462**	.765	1.9	0.5	0.2	0.2	0.7	3.9
2023	Phoenix	34	4	**15.1**	.526	.349	.806	**3.9**	**0.7**	**0.4**	**0.4**	1.1	**7.9**
2024	Las Vegas	**38**	**7**	10.7	.500	.386	.765	1.9	0.2	0.3	0.1	0.4	3.7
2025^{†}	Las Vegas	20	1	11.3	.351	.333	.467	1.8	0.3	0.2	0.3	0.3	3.0
**Career**	7 years, 4 teams	171	13	10.9	.501	.356	.758	2.4	0.4	0.2	0.2	0.6	4.2

==== Playoffs ====
Stats current through end of 2025 playoffs

WNBA playoff statistics
Year	Team	GP	GS	MPG	FG%	3P%	FT%	RPG	APG	SPG	BPG	TO	PPG
2022	Phoenix	2	0	**23.5**	.316	.000	**1.000**	**4.5**	**2.0**	**0.5**	**0.5**	0.5	**9.0**
2024	Las Vegas	4	0	7.5	.200	.000	—	0.5	0.3	0.0	0.0	**0.3**	0.5
2025^{†}	Las Vegas	**10**	0	10.4	**.444**	**.250**	**1.000**	0.9	0.3	0.2	0.1	**0.3**	2.2
**Career**	3 years, 2 teams	16	0	11.3	.357	.125	1.000	1.5	0.5	0.2	0.1	0.3	2.6

=== International ===
==== EuroCup and EuroLeague ====
EuroCup and EuroLeague statistics
Year	Team	GP	GS	MPG	FG%	3P%	FT%	RPG	APG	SPG	BPG	TO	PPG
2020–21 EuroCup	(Poland) ENEA Gorzow	3	—	30.9	.540	.000	.733	10.7	0.7	0.0	1.3	2.3	21.7
2021–22 EuroLeague	(Poland) VBW Arka Gdynia	13	—	32.2	.617	.294	.703	7.2	1.4	0.5	1.2	1.8	18.2
2022–23 EuroLeague	(Greece) Olympiacos SFP	16	—	32.4	.597	.406	.795	9.4	1.1	0.9	0.9	2.3	22.6
2023–24 EuroCup	(United Kingdom) London Lions	12	—	22.2	.609	.467	.650	5.7	0.9	0.2	0.3	1.3	13.9
2023–24 EuroLeague	(United Kingdom) London Lions	2	—	26.8	.667	1.000	.700	7.0	0.0	0.0	0.0	2.5	16.5
2025–26 EuroLeague	(Turkey) Fenerbahçe	6	1	20.8	.527	.300	.833	6.2	1.5	0.3	0.7	1.3	14.0

=== College ===
NCAA statistics
Year	Team	GP	GS	MPG	FG%	3P%	FT%	RPG	APG	SPG	BPG	TO	PPG
2015–16	Iowa	33	14	22.5	.554	—	.615	6.8	0.8	0.3	1.8	1.7	10.7
2016–17	Iowa	34	34	28.9	.647	.000	.788	10.1	0.6	**0.6**	1.3	**1.6**	18.5
2017–18	Iowa	32	32	32.7	.671*	—	**.806**	12.8	1.4	**0.6**	**2.1**	1.9	25.7*
2018–19	Iowa	**36**	**36**	**.341**	**.696***	**1.000**	78.9	**13.4**	**1.7**	0.4	1.8	**1.6**	**27.8***
**Career**		135	116	29.6	.656	.500	.768	10.8	1.1	0.5	1.7	1.7	20.8

== Personal life ==
She announced her engagement with professional basketball player David DiLeo on July 19, 2025. On July 18, 2026, Gustafson and DiLeo got married at Bella Sala in Tiffin, Iowa with former Iowa head coach Lisa Bluder officiating.

== See also ==
- Iowa Hawkeyes women's basketball statistical leaders
- List of NCAA Division I women's basketball career scoring leaders
- List of NCAA Division I women's basketball career rebounding leaders
- List of NCAA Division I women's basketball career field-goal percentage leaders
- List of NCAA Division I women's basketball players with 2,500 points and 1,000 rebounds
- List of NCAA Division I women's basketball season scoring leaders
