= Grand Blanc, Michigan =

- City
- City of Grand Blanc
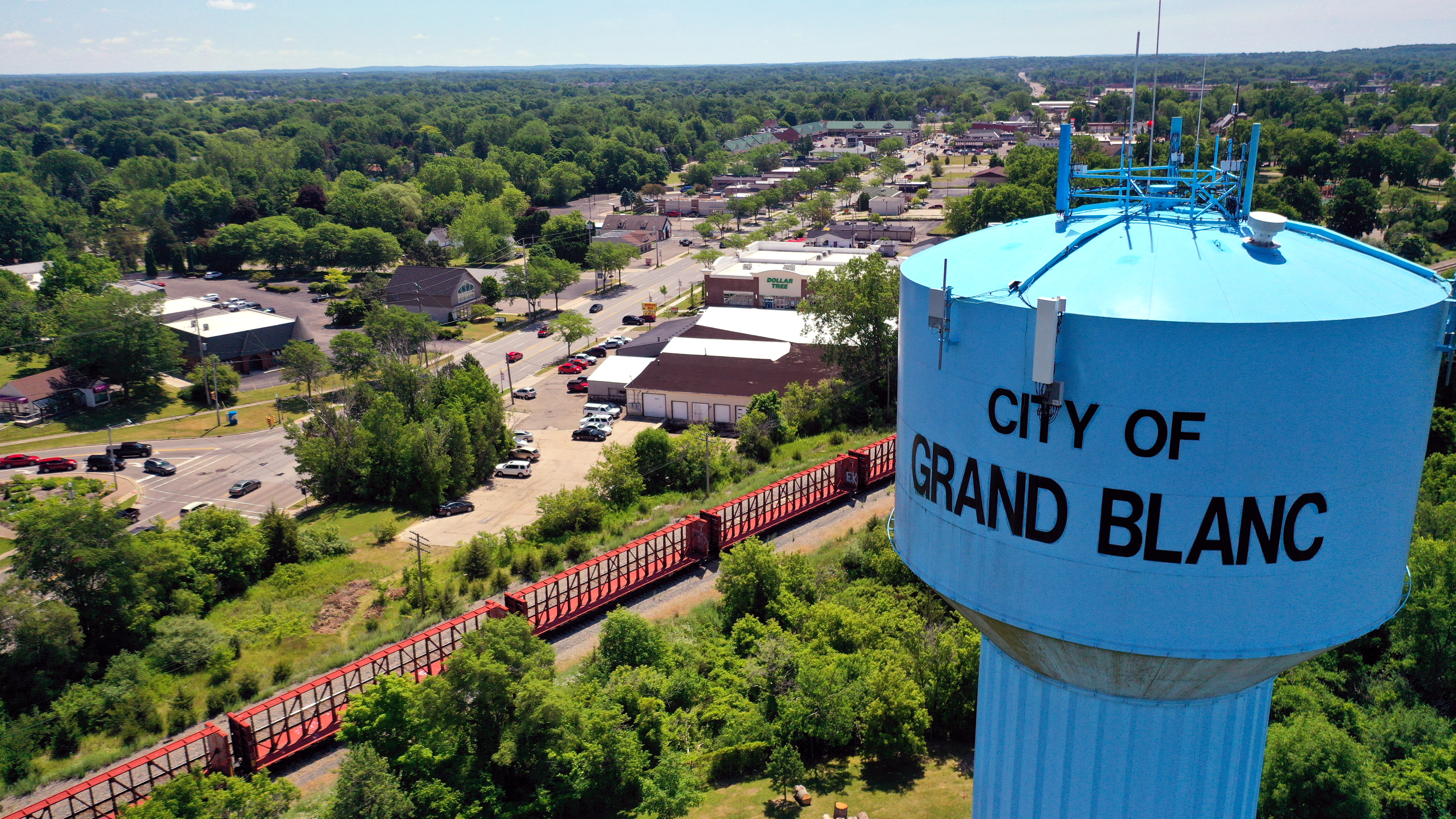
- Water tower overlooking Grand Blanc

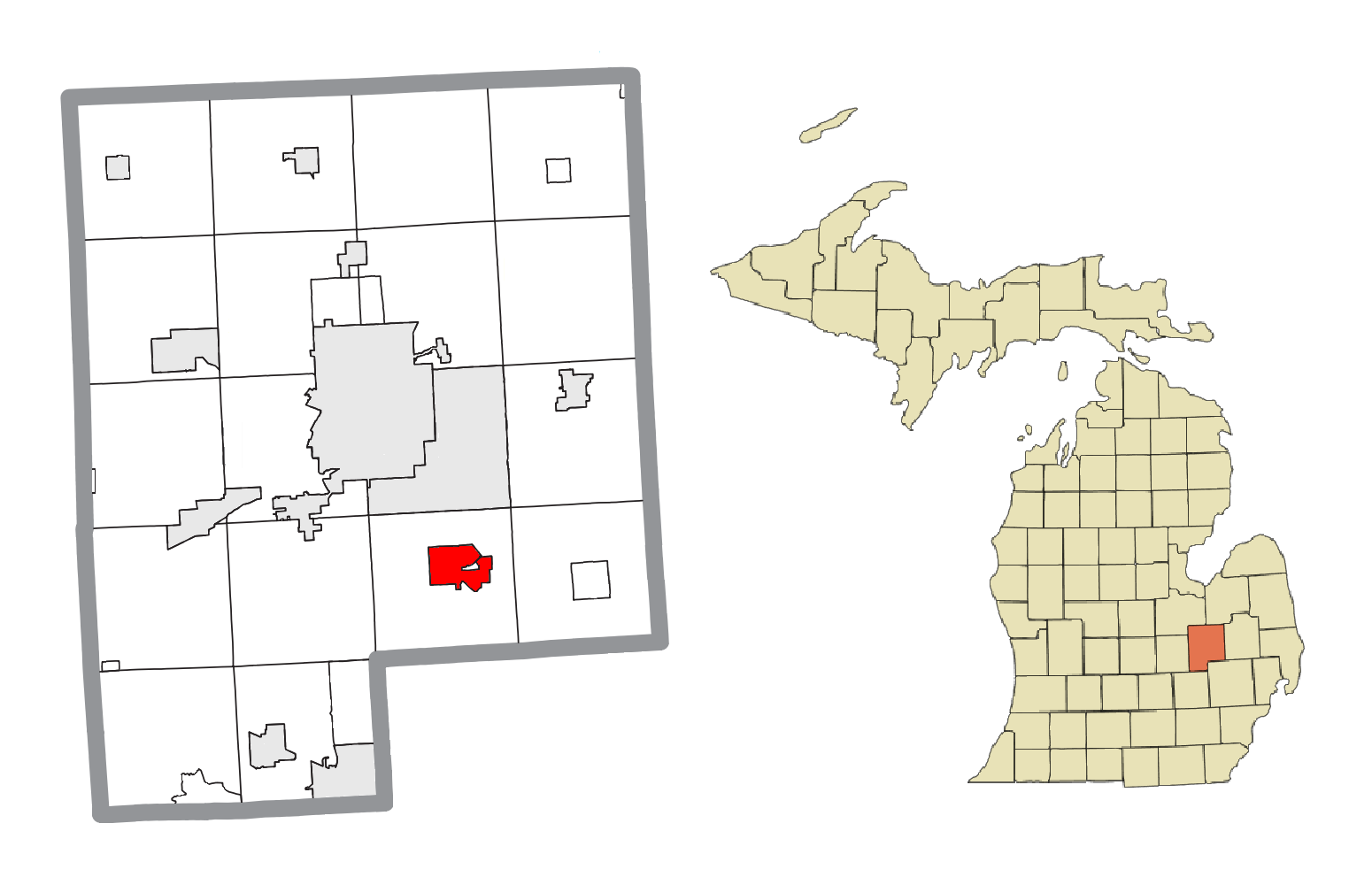
- Location within Genesee County

- Location within the state of Michigan
- Coordinates: 42°55′38″N 83°37′23″W
- Country: United States
- State: Michigan
- County: Genesee
- Settled: 1822
- Incorporated: 1930

Government
  - Type: Council–manager
  - Mayor: John Creasey
  - City manager: Wendy Jean-Buhrer

Area
  - Total: 3.63 sq mi (9.40 km^{2})
  - Land: 3.61 sq mi (9.36 km^{2})
  - Water: 0.019 sq mi (0.05 km^{2}) 0.55%
- Elevation: 837 ft (255 m)

Population (2020)
  - Total: 8,091
  - Density: 2,240.0/sq mi (864.85/km^{2})
- Time zone: UTC-5 (EST)
  - Summer (DST): UTC-4 (EDT)
- ZIP code(s): 48439, 48480
- Area code: 810
- FIPS code: 26-33280
- GNIS feature ID: 0627081
- Website: cityofgrandblancmi.gov

Grand Blanc is a city in Genesee County in the U.S. state of Michigan and a suburb of Flint. The population was 7,784 as of the 2020 US census. It is part of the Flint metropolitan area. The city is surrounded by Grand Blanc Township but is administratively autonomous.

== History ==
The unincorporated village of Grand Blanc, or Grumlaw, was a former Indian campground first settled by Jacob Stevens in 1822. Several years later, settlers improved the Indian trail to Saginaw; they laid out and staked it in 1829 as Saginaw Road. Grand Blanc Township formed in 1833 in an area that became the city. The township center began to boom in 1864 with the arrival of the railroad (now known as the CSX Saginaw Subdivision). With the post office there, the village was called Grand Blanc Centre by 1873, with the former Grand Blanc assuming the name Gibsonville.

By 1916, the community (population 400) had a grade school, a private bank, flour mill, an elevator, a creamery, and two churches, the Methodist Episcopal and the Congregational. The community had electrical lighting.

On September 27th, 1992, president George H.W. Bush ended his Spirit of America train tour in Grand Blanc as a part of his re-election campaign. He and First Lady Barbara Bush gave a speech to a crowd of several thousands of supporters on the back of the train.

On January 1, 2024, the winning ticket for the first Powerball lottery of the new year was sold at Food Castle, a food and liquor store in Grand Blanc. The $842.4 million jackpot represented the fifth-largest in Powerball history and the tenth-largest jackpot ever in U.S. lottery history at the time.

In the early morning of February 28, 2024, an EF2 tornado touched down in Grand Blanc, with winds reaching 115 mph and a peak width of around 450 yards. The tornado started near Creasy Bicentennial Park, damaging trees and outbuildings, before reaching Waretech Industrial Park at the intersection of Dort Highway and Reid Road. The warehouse was completely destroyed. Other businesses and houses in the Indian Hill neighborhood and on Saginaw Road were structurally damaged. The tornado lifted over Perry Road and had a total path length of 5.7 miles. This was the strongest tornado to ever strike Grand Blanc.

=== City ===
Grand Blanc Centre incorporated as the City of Grand Blanc in 1930. In 1939, the township and the city started a joint fire department. In the 1970s, the Grand Blanc city, township, and school district formed a joint parks and recreation department under a commission with two members from each entity. In 1973, Grand Blanc-McFarlen Library was built. It has about 45,000 books and a host of other materials.

A ballot question in the May 2, 2006, Genesee County general election ended governmental research into a plan to consolidate the city and township governments; 68.6% of city voters opposed consolidation efforts.

On January 20, 2019, the Township Board voted to rescind its joint fire department agreement in 90 days unless a new agreement was reached. After eight decades of a shared fire department with Grand Blanc Township, the city started its own department on July 25, 2019, and named a fire chief. Previously, the joint department was funded by each municipal levying a special levy of 0.5 mil for the department and designating 0.5 mil of general levy to the department.

After looking at the lack of management knowledge on the parks and recreation commission in the spring of 2019, the township and city dissolved the commission. The decision was formalized in January 2020, with the township taking over the department to provide services to both municipalities. The city went on to develop its own parks plan before starting its own department.

== Geography ==
According to the United States Census Bureau, the city has an area of 3.63 square miles (9.40 km^{2}), of which 3.61 square miles (9.35 km^{2}) is land and 0.02 square miles (0.05 km^{2}) is water.

== Demographics ==
Historical population
Census	Pop.	Note	%±
1880	216		—
1930	917		—
1940	1,012		10.4%
1950	998		−1.4%
1960	1,565		56.8%
1970	5,132		227.9%
1980	6,848		33.4%
1990	7,760		13.3%
2000	8,242		6.2%
2010	8,276		0.4%
2020	8,091		−2.2%
U.S. Decennial Census

=== 2020 census ===
As of the 2020 census, Grand Blanc had a population of 8,091. The population density was 2,240 inhabitants per square mile (860/km^{2}). The median age was 41.5 years. 20.4% of residents were under the age of 18 and 20.8% of residents were 65 years of age or older. For every 100 females there were 90.0 males, and for every 100 females age 18 and over there were 85.5 males age 18 and over.

100.0% of residents lived in urban areas, while 0.0% lived in rural areas.

There were 3,604 households and 2,026 families in Grand Blanc, of which 25.9% had children under the age of 18 living in them. Of all households, 41.6% were married-couple households, 18.8% were households with a male householder and no spouse or partner present, and 32.8% were households with a female householder and no spouse or partner present. About 36.4% of all households were made up of individuals and 15.9% had someone living alone who was 65 years of age or older. The average household size was 2.19 and the average family size was 2.98.

There were 3,817 housing units, of which 5.6% were vacant. The homeowner vacancy rate was 0.9% and the rental vacancy rate was 8.8%.

Racial composition as of the 2020 census
Race	Number	Percent
White	6,263	77.4%
Black or African American	1,035	12.8%
American Indian and Alaska Native	29	0.4%
Asian	216	2.7%
Native Hawaiian and Other Pacific Islander	0	0.0%
Some other race	74	0.9%
Two or more races	474	5.9%
Hispanic or Latino (of any race)	354	4.4%

=== 2010 census ===
As of the 2010 US Census, there were 8,276 people, 3,566 households, and 2,158 families residing in the city. The population density was 2,177.9 inhabitants per square mile (840.9/km^{2}). There were 3,784 housing units at an average density of 995.8 per square mile (384.5/km^{2}). The racial makeup of the city was 82.5% White, 11.1% African American, 0.4% Native American, 2.8% Asian, 0.4% from other races, and 2.9% from two or more races. Hispanic or Latino of any race were 2.6% of the population.

Of 3,567 households, 28.9% had children under the age of 18 living with them, 43.4% were married couples living together, 13.0% had a female householder with no husband present, and 39.5% were non-families. 34.0% of all households were made up of individuals, and 12.9% had someone living alone who was 65 years of age or older. The average household size was 2.28 and the average family size was 2.94.

The city's population as of 2010 census data was 53.7% female and 46.3% male. The median age was 39.1 years and the population exhibits a bimodal age distribution with peak age groups at 10-14 and 45–49 years (7.5% and 7.2%, respectively).

=== 2000 census ===
As of the 2000 US Census, the median income for a household in the city was $54,099, and the median income for a family was $82,456. Males had a median income of $61,522 versus $31,051 for females. The per capita income for the city was $32,622. About 3.7% of families and 5.5% of the population were below the poverty line, including 6.3% of those under age 18 and 3.9% of those age 65 or over.

== Government ==
The city has a council-manager form of government. The municipality operates its own water system.

The city is served by various specialized units of government:

- Grand Blanc Community Schools
- Genesee District Library, which has a branch location, Grand Blanc-McFarlen, in the city owned by the city and township
- Senior Center
- Fourth Division B of the 67th District Court of the State of Michigan.

District	Number	Officeholder
U.S. Representative	8th	Kristen McDonald Rivet
State Senate	24th	Ruth Johnson
State Representative	50	Tim Sneller
County Commissioner	5	James Avery
District Court	67th 4th Division	Christopher R. Odette
Community College	C.S. Mott	Multiple; see article

== Notable people ==
- Elias Abuelazam (born 1976), Israeli-born serial killer
- Andrew Caldwell, actor best known for roles in Hannah Montana, Shredderman Rules, and College
- Zach Carroll (born 1994), soccer player
- Grant Fisher (born 1997), middle and long distance runner
- Chuck Forrest, five-time champion on the TV game show Jeopardy! in 1985, and the winner of the second Tournament of Champions in 1986
- Geena Gall (born 1987), middle-distance runner and 2012 Olympian
- Dominic Gasso (born 2003), soccer player
- Mark Ingram, Jr. (born 1989), 2009 Heisman Trophy winner and running back for the New Orleans Saints
- Karen Newman, singer
- Rob Paulsen (born 1956), Emmy Award-winning voice actor
- Evan Peters (born 1987), actor best known for his roles in American Horror Story, American Horror Story: Asylum, and Never Back Down
- Morris Peterson Jr. (born August 26, 1977), college and NBA basketball player who won the 2000 NCAA men’s basketball championship with Michigan State
- Steve Van Wormer (born 1969), actor
