= List of people from Traverse City, Michigan =

Location of Traverse City in Michigan

The following is a list of notable people associated with Traverse City, Michigan. These people were born or lived in Traverse City.

== Academia ==
- Thomas R. Plough (born 1941), sociologist and president of North Dakota State University and Assumption College
- Scott Schwenter (born 1968), professor of Hispanic Linguistics at Ohio State University

== Activism ==
- Chasten Buttigieg (born 1989), writer, teacher, and LGBT+ activist
- Helen Milliken (1922–2012), activist, environmentalist, and first lady of Michigan
- Pun Plamondon (1945–2023), left-wing activist

== Crime ==
- Charles L. Meach (1947–2004), serial killer

== Industry ==
- John T. Parsons (1913–2007), engineer
- Eugene Power (1905–1993), entrepreneur
- Frank L. Stulen (1921–2010), engineer and mayor of Traverse City in 1961

== Law ==
- Pearl M. Hart (1890–1975), attorney
- Thomas G. Power (born 1950), judge and member of the Michigan House of Representatives

== Media ==
=== Art ===
- Eric Daigh (born 1977)
- Anna Fidler (born 1973)
- Michael Huey (born 1964)
- Barbara McGuire, painter, jewelry designer, and clay artist
- Ezra Winter (1886–1949), muralist
- George Wurtzel (born 1954), craftsman and woodworker

=== Film, television, and theater ===
- Kate Botello, television and radio personality
- Jeremy Davies (born 1969), actor
- Carol Duvall (1926–2023), television personality
- Wren Zhawenim Gotts (born 2013), actress
- Michael Moore (born 1954), director, screenwriter, producer, and author
- Bill Morey (1919–2003), actor
- Carter Oosterhouse (born 1976), television personality
- Pat Paulsen (1927–1997), comedian, satirist, and actor
- Julius H. Steinberg (1847–1943), theater entrepreneur
- Martha Teichner (born 1948), CBS News correspondent
- Barry Watson (born 1974), actor
- David Wayne (1914–1995), actor

=== Music ===
- Bob James (born 1939), pianist, arranger, and record producer
- Angela Josephine (born 1967), singer-songwriter and musician
- Matt Noveskey (born 1976), singer-songwriter and bassist in bands Blue October and Harvard of the South
- Wilson Sawyer (1917–1979), composer, arranger, and musician
- Mel Schacher (born 1951), bassist in band Grand Funk Railroad
- Claudia Schmidt (born 1953), singer-songwriter and musician
- Billy Strings (born 1992), bluegrass musician

==== Bands ====
- The Accidentals (formed 2012)
- Salem (formed 2006)

=== Print media ===
- M. E. C. Bates (1839–1905), writer, journalist, and newspaper editor
- Clara Nettie Bates (1876–1966), editor, writer, and clubwoman
- Mary K. Buck (1841–1901), author
- Alma Routsong (1924–1996), novelist
- Harold Sherman (1898–1987), novelist and lecturer
- Doug Stanton, author, journalist, lecturer, and screenwriter
- Craig Thompson (born 1975), graphic novelist

== Military ==
- Demas T. Craw (1900–1942), United States Air Force officer and posthumous Medal of Honor recipient
- Michael Carey (born 1960), United States Air Force officer
- Guy Fort (1879–1942), brigadier general in the Philippine Army under control of the United States Army Forces in the Far East
- Alden G. Glauch (1919–2015), major general in the United States Air Force

== Politics ==
=== National ===
- Pete Buttigieg (born 1982), former United States Secretary of Transportation, former mayor of South Bend, Indiana, and candidate for President of the United States in 2020.
- Robert P. Griffin (1923–2015), U.S. representative, senator, and Michigan Supreme Court justice

=== State ===
- Jason Allen (born 1963), member of Michigan House of Representatives and Michigan Senate
- Morgan Bates (1806–1874), 19th Lieutenant Governor of Michigan
- Betsy Coffia (born 1977), member of the Michigan House of Representatives
- James E. Defebaugh (1926–2014), member of the Michigan House of Representatives
- Michael Dively (born 1938), member of the Michigan House of Representatives
- Kevin Elsenheimer (born 1965), member of the Michigan House of Representatives and judge
- Arnell Engstrom (1897–1970), member of the Michigan House of Representatives
- George A. McManus Jr. (1930–2024), member of the Michigan Senate
- James T. Milliken (1882–1952), mayor of Traverse City and member of the Michigan Senate
- James W. Milliken (1848–1908), member of the Michigan Senate
- William Milliken (1922–2019), 44th and longest-serving Governor of Michigan
- Howard Walker (born 1954), member of the Michigan House of Representatives and Michigan Senate

=== Local ===
- Derek Bailey (1972–2021), chairman of the Grand Traverse Band of Ottawa and Chippewa Indians
- Perry Hannah (1824–1904), founding father and first mayor of Traverse City, and member of the Michigan House of Representatives

== Religion ==
- Carol Gilbert (born 1947), Dominican religious sister and anti-nuclear activist

== Science ==
- Andrea Kritcher, nuclear engineer and physicist
- Ross Overbeek (born 1949), engineer and mathematician
- Bernice Steadman (1925–2015), aviator
- Jane Willets Ettawageshik (1915–1996), anthropologist

== Sports ==
=== American football ===
- Mark Brammer (born 1958), tight end
- Max Bullough (born 1992), linebacker and coach
- Riley Bullough (born 1993), linebacker
- Joshua Burnham (born 2004), defensive end
- Tom Edwards (1899–1980), tackle
- Jake Fisher (born 1993), offensive tackle
- Eric Gordon (born 1987), linebacker
- Ryan Hayes (born 2000), offensive tackle
- Gary Hogeboom (born 1958), quarterback
- Joe Kerridge (born 1992), fullback
- Darren Keyton (born 1990), guard
- Chris Kolarevic (born 1999), linebacker
- Bunny Oakes (1898–1970), coach
- Damon Sheehy-Guiseppi (born 1995), wide receiver and kick returner

=== Baseball ===
- Donna Chartier, utility infielder
- Doug Mirabelli (born 1970), catcher
- Andy Pascoe (born 1988), catcher and infielder

=== Basketball ===
- Holden Greiner (born 1991), forward
- Tom Kozelko (born 1951), power forward
- Dan Majerle (born 1965), shooting guard/small forward and coach
- Suzy Merchant (born 1969), coach
- Aaliyah Nye (born 2002), shooting guard/small forward
- Autumn Rademacher (born 1975), coach

=== Golf ===
- Walter Hagen (1892–1969)

=== Ice hockey ===
- Dallas Drake (born 1969), winger
- Brandon Halverson (born 1996), goaltender
- Mike Matteucci (born 1971), defenseman
- Zach Redmond (born 1988), defenseman
- Brian Rolston (born 1973), center
- John Scott (born 1982), defenseman and winger, 2016 National Hockey League All-Star Game MVP

=== Motorsports ===
- Dick Burleson (born 1948), enduro racer

=== Rugby ===
- Angus MacLellan (born 1992), prop
- Phil Thiel (born 1984), prop and hooker

=== Soccer ===
- Casey Townsend (born 1989), forward and midfielder

=== Wrestling ===
- Robert Hewitt (1906–1978)
