= Traverse City Central High School =

Location
- 1150 Milliken Drive; Traverse City, Michigan 49686; United States; 44°46′4″N 85°35′19″W

Information
- Other names: Central, Traverse City Central, TCC, TCCHS, CHS
- Type: Public, coeducational high school
- Established: 1853; 173 years ago (as the Central School); 1959 (Traverse City Senior High School); 1997 (Central High School)
- School district: Traverse City Area Public Schools
- Superintendent: John VanWagoner
- Principal: Ben Berger
- Staff: 56.03 (on an FTE basis)
- Grades: 9-12
- Enrollment: 1,326 (2024-25)
- Student to teacher ratio: 23.67
- Colors: Black; Gold
- Fight song: "Come On, Fight!"
- Athletics: MHSAA Class A; D-2
- Athletics conference: Big North Conference; Saginaw Valley League (football only)
- Team name: Trojans
- Rival: Traverse City West Senior High School
- Accreditation: AdvancED commission
- Publication: Front & Central
- Newspaper: Black & Gold Quarterly (BGQ)
- Yearbook: Pines
- Feeder schools: Elementary schools: Central Grade; Cherry Knoll; Courtade; Eastern; TCAPS Montessori; Traverse Heights; Middle school: Traverse City East
- Website: www.tcaps.net/o/tcchs

Traverse City Central High School (also known as Central High School, TC Central, or simply TCC) is a public high school in Traverse City, Michigan. It is one of two comprehensive high schools in the Traverse City Area Public Schools district. It is the second-largest high school in Northern Michigan, behind nearby Traverse City West Senior High School.

== History ==
The first public school in Traverse City opened in 1853. In 1877, it was moved to a new building called the Central School, built at Seventh and Pine Streets, which was rebuilt as a brick building in 1886. In 1934, the Central school building burned down, and students were relocated to the nearby Perry Hannah House while the school was being rebuilt.

In 1959, grades 10 through 12 moved into a new building called Traverse City Senior High School at its present-day location, on grounds formerly owned by the Northwestern Michigan College.

In 1978, 1985 and 1988, the Trojans of Traverse City Senior High School won the MHSAA Class A football championships.

In 1997, because of overcrowding at the school, which had become one of the largest high schools in Michigan, a second high school was built, and opened in early 1998. The new high school became Traverse City West Senior High School, and the existing one was renamed to Traverse City Central High School.

From 1997 to 2022, Traverse City Central's athletic programs were part of the Big North Conference, which was founded as a collection of Northern Michigan's largest public high schools after Traverse City's school split. However, in 2021, both Central and rival West made the decision to move football programs to the Saginaw Valley League in 2022, but remain in the Big North for all other offered sports.

In 2021, a group of white students at Traverse City Central held a mock slave auction on Snapchat where they sold fellow students of color. An attempt by the school board to pass an equity resolution condemning racism met with a fierce backlash from white parents, who falsely claimed that it was a means of indoctrinating students with critical race theory.

In October 2023, construction began on a new "Innovation & Manufacturing Center" at the school, focusing on STEM education. The new wing is expected to open by the end of 2024.

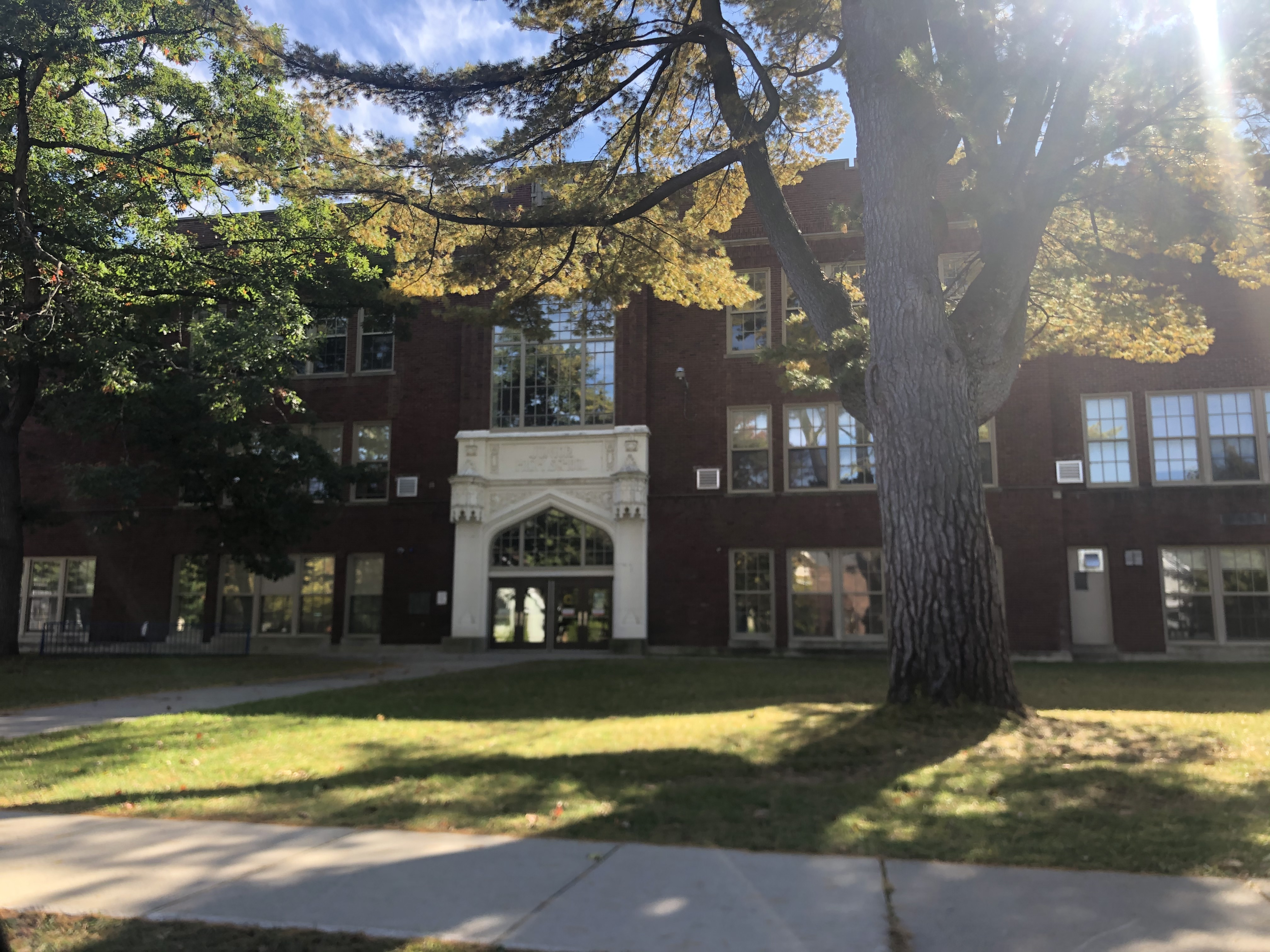
The original Traverse City High School from 1937 to 1959. Today, this building houses Central Grade School, a TCAPS elementary school.

== Demographics ==
The demographic breakdown of the 1,326 students enrolled in 2024-25 was:

- Male – 52.2%
- Female – 47.8%
- American Indian/Alaska Native – 1.7%
- Asian – 2.5%
- Black – 2.9%
- Hispanic – 3.1%
- Native Hawaiian/Pacific Islander – 0.1%
- White – 89.8%
- Multiracial – 0.0%
- 9th Grade – 23.6%
- 10th Grade – 23.5%
- 11th Grade – 26.0%
- 12th Grade – 26.8%

Additionally, 269 students (20.3%) were eligible for reduced-price or free lunch.

== Athletics ==
Traverse City Central's sports teams are known as the Trojans. The school is part of the Big North Conference for all sports except football, which plays in the Saginaw Valley League and is considered a Class A school by MHSAA.

In 1978, 1985 and 1988, the Trojans of Traverse City Senior High School won the MHSAA Class A football championships. In 2021, the Trojans made it to the MHSAA Division 2 Championship round at Ford Field, but ultimately lost to the Warren De La Salle Pilots.

=== Rivalries ===
Traverse City Central has had an intense crosstown rivalry with the Traverse City West Titans since 1997. Prior to then, the Traverse City Trojans had an intense rivalry with the Alpena Wildcats.

== Notable alumni ==
- Mark Brammer, former NFL tight end
- Joshua Burnham, college football defensive end for the Indiana Hoosiers Football
- Demas T. Craw, United States Army Air Force officer
- Eric Daigh, artist
- Kevin Elsenheimer, judge and politician
- Alden G. Glauch, former major general of the United States Air Force
- Dan Holmes, author, sportswriter
- Tom Kozelko, former NBA player
- Andrea Lynn Kritcher, nuclear engineer and physicist
- Dan Majerle, former all-star NBA player
- William Milliken, former Governor of Michigan
- Suzy Merchant, MSU Girls Basketball Coach
- Andy Pascoe, baseball player and coach
- Thomas G. Power, judge
- Autumn Rademacher, assistant basketball coach at University of Nebraska Omaha
- Zach Redmond, Colorado Avalanche Defenseman
- Alma Routsong, lesbian fiction novelist
- Scott Schwenter, professor of Hispanic linguistics at Ohio State University
- Harold Sherman, author
- Ezra Winter, muralist
