= Traverse City West Senior High School =

Location
- 5376 North Long Lake Road; Traverse City, Michigan 49685; United States; 44°44′50″N 85°41′09″W

Information
- Other names: West, Traverse City West, TCW, TCWSH, WSH
- School type: Public secondary
- Motto: "Home of the Titans!"
- Established: September 2, 1997; 29 years ago January 26, 1998 (building opened)
- School district: Traverse City Area Public Schools
- Superintendent: John VanWagoner
- Principal: Brian Guiney
- Teaching staff: 56.14 (on an FTE basis)
- Enrollment: 1,384 (2024–25)
- Student to teacher ratio: 24.65
- Colors: Forest Green; Metallic Gold
- Fight song: "The Fightin' Titan"
- Athletics: MHSAA Class A; D-1
- Athletics conference: Big North Conference; Saginaw Valley League (football only)
- Mascot: Greek titan
- Team name: Titans
- Rival: Traverse City Central High School
- Publication: Westside Weekly
- Newspaper: The Occidentalist
- Yearbook: Odyssey
- Feeder schools: Elementary schools: Blair; Central Grade; Long Lake; Silver Lake; TCAPS Montessori; Westwoods; Willow Hill; Middle school: Traverse City West
- Website: tcaps.net/o/tcwshs/

Traverse City West Senior High School (also known as West Senior High, TC West, or simply TCW) is a public, co-educational secondary school located outside Traverse City, Michigan, in neighboring Garfield Township. TC West is part of the Traverse City Area Public Schools district and one of six high schools in Traverse City. The school enrolls about 1,500 students each year, making it the largest high school in Michigan north of Kent County. The school was established in 1997, and opened in early 1998.

Since 2008, Traverse City West has offered grades 9 through 12. Students are offered a wide variety of honors and AP classes, and given the option to dual enroll and attend classes at Northwestern Michigan College.

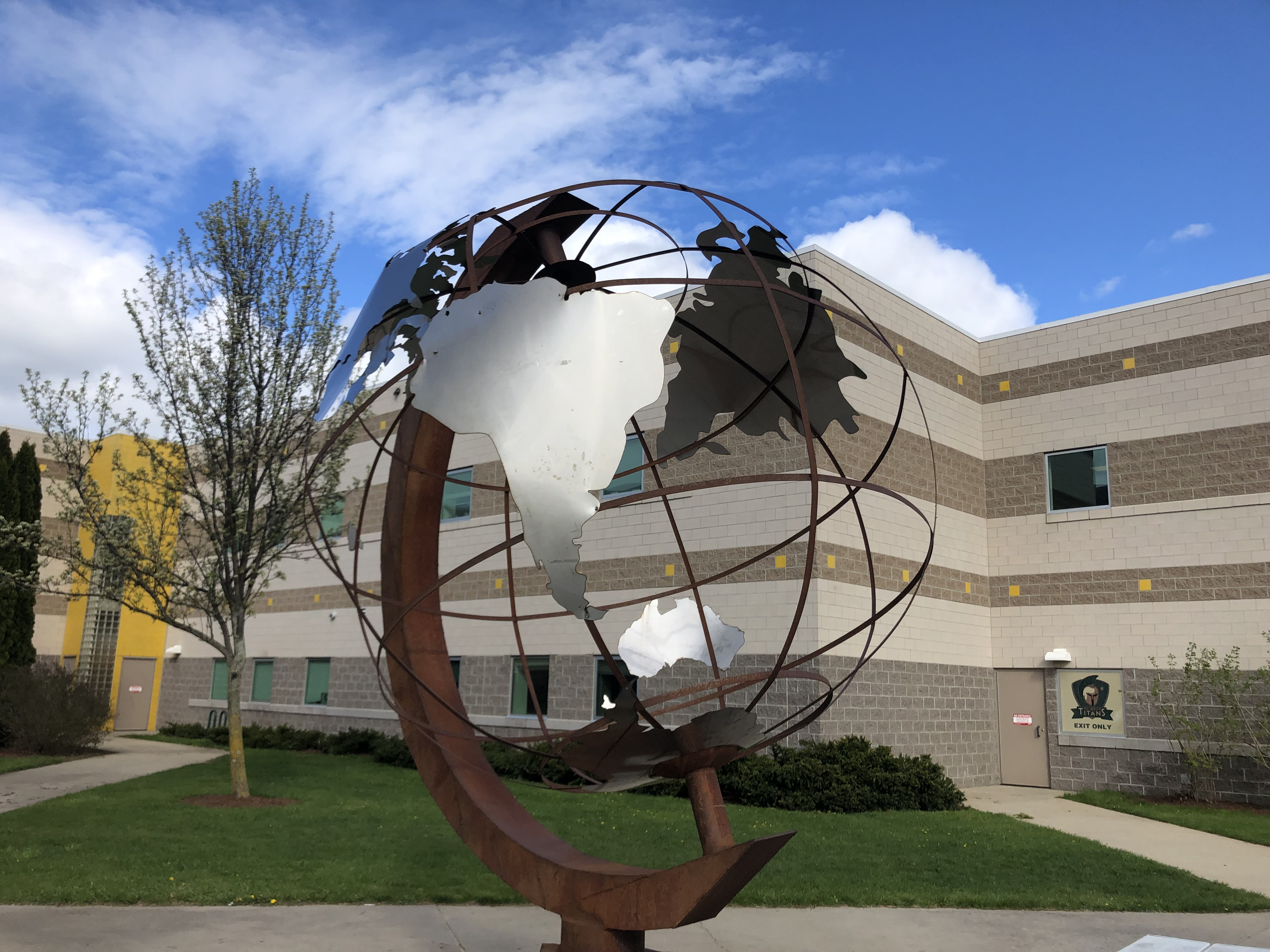
A large metallic globe near one of the school's main entrances. This globe was removed in 2020.

== History ==
Prior to 1997, Traverse City only had one public high school, Traverse City Senior High School, built in 1959 at the base of the Old Mission Peninsula. Until this point, Traverse City Senior High was Michigan's largest high school, with over 3,000 students enrolled annually. A proposal for a new school was brought to the TCAPS board in June 1996, with a number of other proposed names listed, including:

- Traverse City Western High School
- Traverse City West View High School
- Traverse City West Hills High School
- Traverse City Forest View High School

Other proposed school team names were listed in this proposal, too, including:

- Buffaloes
- Cougars
- Eagles
- Highlanders
- Spartans (in honor of the Michigan State Spartans)

A groundbreaking ceremony was held on June 7, 1996, and the new school was finally opened to students on January 26, 1998. Since that time, West Senior High's enrollment has generally encompassed students living west of Division Street. In 2009, a new gymnasium and athletic hub was added to the school.

In 2020, alumnus Chasten Buttigieg, spouse of United States Secretary of Transportation Pete Buttigieg, wrote I Have Something to Tell You. The memoir includes anecdotes about Buttigieg's time at Traverse City West, calling it Traverse City's "hick school", citing the school's tradition of "Bring Your Tractor to School Day".

In 2016 and 2022, the Traverse City West student section, nicknamed the "Bleacher Creatures", won the Battle of the Fans, an MHSAA contest that determines the best student section in the state of Michigan.

In 2022, after 25 years of competing in the Big North Conference, Traverse City West and rival Traverse City Central moved their football programs into the North Division of the Saginaw Valley League.

In October 2023, construction began on a new "Innovation & Manufacturing Center" at the school, focusing on STEM education. The new wing opened in April 2025.

=== Spirit Rock controversy ===
In 2017, the "spirit rock," a large stone often painted by students to celebrate various victories, suddenly went missing. After an investigation, it was discovered that principal Joe Esper directed vice principal Charles Kolbusz to bury the rock. Kolbusz brought a backhoe to the school after-hours, and buried the rock in a hole he dug on school grounds. Superintendent Paul Soma reported that, upon initial questioning, both conspirators denied any knowledge of the events. Following the investigation, Esper was put on unpaid leave for five days. In 2018, the administration put a new spirit rock in the old one's place.

=== Principals ===
In its history, Traverse City West has had three head principals:

| Principal | Tenure |
|---|---|
| Joe Tibaldi | 1997–2014 |
| Joe Esper | 2014–2025 |
| Brian Guiney | 2025–present |

== Academics ==
Traverse City West offers 132 classes to its students, including 17 AP courses. In addition, students are also given the option to dual-enroll with Northwestern Michigan College. Students can also attend the Career-Tech Center of Northwest Educational Services school district (formerly TBAISD), which offers special technological education for juniors and seniors at West, as those of other districts under TBAISD.

West's student body is divided into three "neighborhoods": Athens, Olympia, and Sparta. These neighborhoods offer smaller learning communities and the chance to form better bonds with their peers and educators.

== Demographics ==
The demographic breakdown of Traverse City West's 1,384 students enrolled in 2024–25 was:

- Male – 51.8%
- Female – 48.2%
- American Indian/Alaska Native – 2.5%
- Asian – 1.6%
- Black – 2.0%
- Hispanic – 3.6%
- Native Hawaiian/Pacific Islander – 0.4%
- White – 90.0%
- Multiracial – 0.0%
- 9th Grade – 26.6%
- 10th Grade – 24.3%
- 11th Grade – 24.8%
- 12th Grade – 24.3%

Additionally, 294 students (21.2%) were eligible for reduced-price or free lunch.

== Athletics ==
Traverse City West's sports teams are known as the Titans. Since 2022, the school has been part of the North Division of the Saginaw Valley League for football, and the Big North Conference for other school-sanctioned sports. West is considered a Division-1 and Class A school by MHSAA, meaning it is in the highest enrollment class for the state. West offers the following sports:

Fall sports

- Boys' Soccer
- Boys' Tennis
- Cheerleading
- Cross Country
- Football
- Girls' Golf
- Rowing
- Swimming
- Volleyball

Winter sports

- Basketball
- Wrestling
- Cross Country Skiing
- Bowling
- Figure Skating
- Hockey
- Skiing (Alpine)

Spring sports

- Baseball
- Boys' Golf
- Equestrian Club
- Girls' Soccer
- Girls' Tennis
- Lacrosse
- Rowing
- Sailing
- Softball
- Track and Field

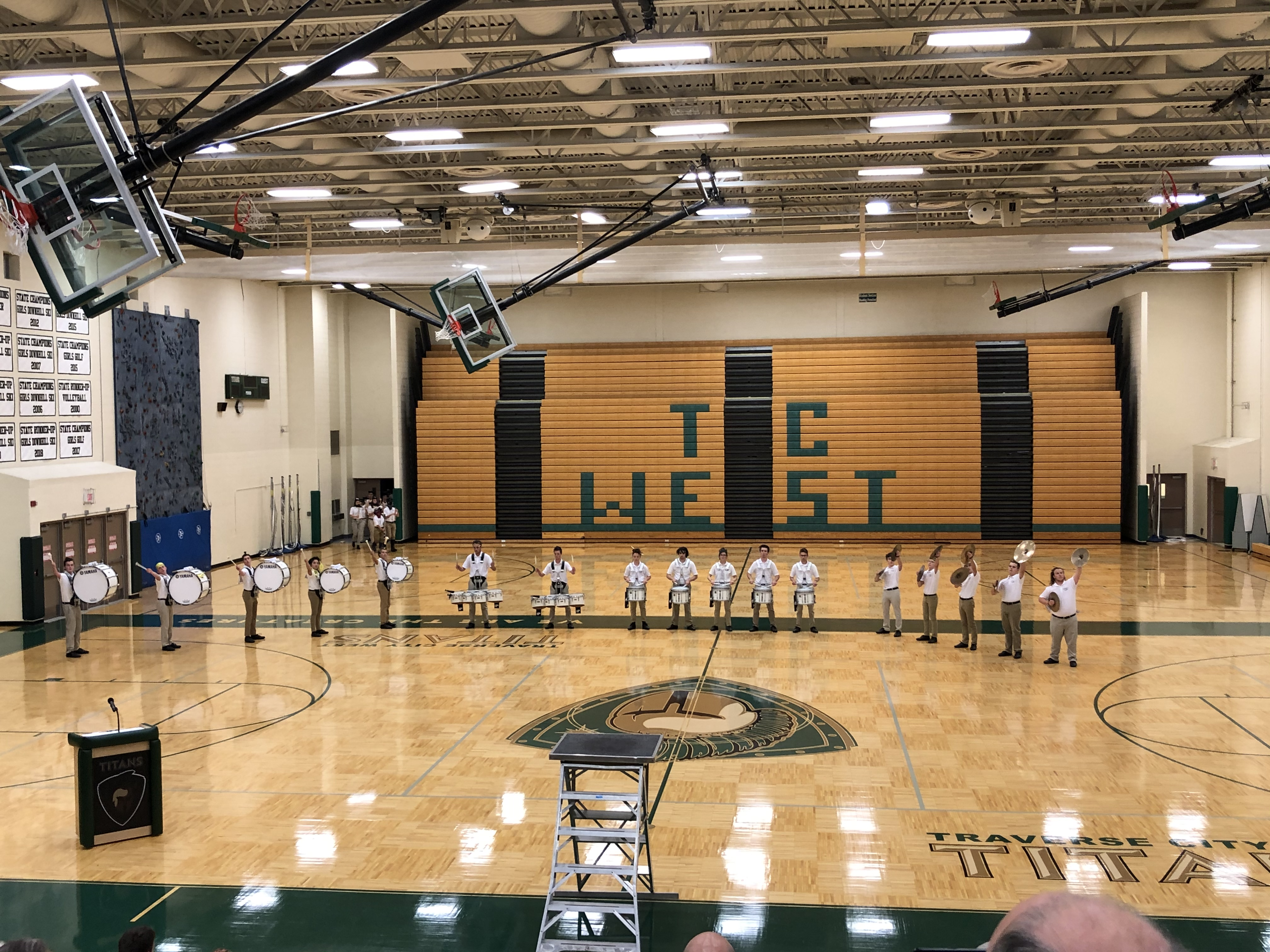
The Titan Drumline performing in 2019

Traverse City West has won seven Division 1 Alpine Ski State Championships; four boys' (2021, 2022, 2023, 2026) and three girls' (2015, 2023, 2024). Additionally, Traverse City West won the 2006 Division 1 Boys' Soccer State Championship, over Livonia Stevenson.

=== Sports rivalries ===
==== Traverse City Central High School ====
Since Traverse City Senior High School split in 1997, there has been a natural rivalry between West and Central. Every year since, the two schools have met at least once a year for each sport, with football, basketball, and ice hockey being the most intense matchups. Since 2012, this annual football game between the schools has been known as the Traverse City Patriot Game, and honors fallen members of the United States Armed Forces from Northwest Michigan. The winning team is awarded the Nowak-Olson Trophy. In 2020, the game was known as the Celebrate Service Game, and honored frontline workers of the COVID-19 pandemic. TC West has won 15 of the 29 football matchups with TC Central.

==== Grand Haven High School ====
Traverse City West also has a football rivalry with the Buccaneers of Grand Haven High School in Ottawa County. This began in 2016, and has been played as West's second game of the season in every year since. This rivalry began because the two cities are both designated Coast Guard Cities by the United States Coast Guard. The winning team is awarded the Coast Guard Cup.

Pre-2009 logo

== Notable alumni ==
- Chasten Buttigieg (class of 2007), former first gentleman of South Bend, Indiana
- Jake Fisher (class of 2011), NFL player for the Cincinnati Bengals and Buffalo Bills
- Eric Gordon (class of 2005), former Michigan State Spartan linebacker
- Ryan Hayes (class of 2018), former Michigan Wolverines football player and NFL player for the Miami Dolphins
- Darren Keyton (class of 2008), former NFL player for the Detroit Lions
- Phil Thiel (class of 2003), former professional rugby player for Life University
- Casey Townsend (class of 2007), professional soccer player for FC Cincinnati
- Brady Smith (Class of 2029), semi-professional doom scroller and Screenager
