= Big North Conference (Michigan) =

High school athletic conference

The Big North Conference (BNC) is a high school athletic conference in Michigan. The conference is affiliated with the Michigan High School Athletic Association (MHSAA).

The conference contains nine of the largest high schools across Northern Michigan and the Upper Peninsula. Among these schools, four are full-time members, two are non-football members, and three are football-only members.

== History ==
The conference was created in 1997 after the split of Traverse City Senior High School into Central and West high schools. It combined the eight largest schools in Northern Michigan. In 2004, due to decreasing enrollment, Cheboygan and Sault Area left the conference. West Branch Ogemaw Heights joined the conference in 2011, but they left the conference after the 2015-16 school year due to decreasing enrollment as well.

In 2021, the league announced the departure of Traverse City Central and Traverse City West high schools' football programs, and those schools becoming associate members of the Saginaw Valley League. However, other sports offered by those schools will continue to participate in the Big North Conference.

In 2023, it was announced that three high schools, Escanaba, Marquette, and Sault Area, would be joining the BNC as football-only members.

== Member schools ==
Non-football members

Football-only members

| School | Mascot | Colors | Class (enrollment) | City | County | Year joined | Previous league |
|---|---|---|---|---|---|---|---|
| Alpena High School | Wildcats | | 1,023 (A) | Alpena | Alpena | 1997 | Great Lakes Athletic Conference |
| Cadillac High School | Vikings | | 860 (A) | Cadillac | Wexford | 1997 | North Central Conference |
| Escanaba High School | Eskymos | | 709 (B) | Escanaba | Delta | 2023 | Great Northern UP Conference |
| Gaylord High School | Blue Devils | | 901 (A) | Gaylord | Otsego | 1997 | Michigan Huron Shores Conference |
| Marquette Senior High School | Sentinels | | 1,059 (A) | Marquette | Marquette | 2023 | Great Northern UP Conference |
| Petoskey High School | Northmen | | 853 (A) | Petoskey | Emmet | 1997 | Michigan Huron Shores Conference |
| Sault Area High School | Blue Devils | | 786 (B) | Sault Ste. Marie | Chippewa | 2023 | Great Northern UP Conference |
| Traverse City Central High School | Trojans | | 1,382 (A) | Traverse City | Grand Traverse | 1997 | Great Lakes Athletic Conference |
| Traverse City West Senior High School | Titans | | 1,455 (A) | Traverse City | Grand Traverse | 1997 | N/A (new school) |

=== Former schools ===
| School | Mascot | Colors | Class (enrollment) | City | County | Year joined | Previous league | Year left | Current league |
|---|---|---|---|---|---|---|---|---|---|
| Cheboygan High School | Chiefs | | B (602) | Cheboygan | Cheboygan | 1997 | Michigan Huron Shores Conference | 2004 | Northern Shores Conference; Northern Michigan Football League (football only) |
| Ogemaw Heights High School | Falcons | | B (556) | West Branch | Ogemaw | 2011 | Northeast Michigan Conference | 2016 | Jack Pine Conference |
| Sault Area High School | Blue Devils | | A (884) | Sault Ste. Marie | Chippewa | 1997 | Michigan Huron Shores Conference | 2004 | Straits Area Conference; Big North Conference (football only) |

=== Membership timeline ===
Full member
Football-only member
Non-football member

== Football champions ==
From 1997 to 1999 the Big North had a A division and a B division.

| Year | A Champion | Record | B Champion | Record |
|---|---|---|---|---|
| 1997 | Traverse City West | 7–2–0 (3–0–0) | Petoskey | 8–1–0 (3–0–0) |
| 1998 | Traverse City West | 6–3 (3–0) | Petoskey | 9–2 (3–0) |
| 1999 | Traverse City West | 5–4 (3–0) | Sault Ste. Marie | 7–3 (3–0) |

Since 2000, the conference has operated with one division.

| Year | Champion | Record |
|---|---|---|
| 2000 | Cadillac | 9–1 (7–0) |
| 2001 | Gaylord | 9–1 (7–0) |
| 2002 | Gaylord | 11–1 (7–0) |
| 2003 | Traverse City West | 7–3 (7–0) |
| 2004 | Traverse City West | 10–1 (5–0) |
| 2005 | Gaylord | 6–3 (4–1) |
| 2005 | Traverse City Central | 6–4 (4–1) |
| 2006 | Traverse City West | 6–4 (5–0) |
| 2007 | Traverse City Central | 5–4 (4–1) |
| 2007 | Traverse City West | 6–4 (4–1) |
| 2008 | Petoskey | 9–2 (4–1) |
| 2008 | Traverse City West | 6–4 (4–1) |
| 2009 | Cadillac | 8–2 (5–0) |
| 2010 | Petoskey | 8–2 (4–1) |
| 2010 | Traverse City West | 6–4 (4–1) |
| 2011 | Petoskey | 9–2 (6–0) |
| 2012 | Traverse City Central | 9–2 (6–0) |
| 2013 | Cadillac | 11–1 (6–0) |
| 2014 | Cadillac | 9–1 (6–0) |
| 2015 | Traverse City Central | 9–1 (6–0) |
| 2016 | Traverse City Central | 9–2 (5–0) |
| 2017 | Traverse City West | 9–2 (5–0) |
| 2018 | Traverse City West | 7–3 (5–0) |
| 2019 | Traverse City Central | 8–2 (5–0) |
| 2020 | Traverse City Central | 9–2 (5–0) |
| 2021 | Traverse City Central | 12–2 (5–0) |
| 2022 | Cadillac | 5–5 (3–0) |
| 2023 | Gaylord | 11–1 (6–0) |
| 2024 | Petoskey | 11-1 (6-0) |
| 2025 | Gaylord | 10-1 (7-0) |

=== Teams in the Final Regular Season Rankings ===
| Year | Team | Division | Rank |
|---|---|---|---|
| 2002 | Gaylord | 3 | 3rd |
| 2004 | Traverse City West | 1 | 3rd |
| 2008 | Petoskey | 3 | 9th |
| 2009 | Cadillac | 3 | 7th |
| 2009 | Petoskey | 3 | 10th |
| 2012 | Traverse City Central | 2 | 6th |
| 2013 | Cadillac | 4 | 3rd |
| 2014 | Cadillac | 4 | 3rd |
| 2015 | Traverse City Central | 2 | 4th |
| 2016 | Traverse City Central | 2 | 9th |
| 2017 | Traverse City West | 1 | 10th |
| 2019 | Traverse City Central | 2 | 7th |
| 2020 | Traverse City Central | 2 | 10th |
| 2021 | Traverse City Central | 2 | 3rd |
| 2021 | Cadillac | 4 | 7th |

=== Conference Records ===
| Team | Big North Record | Pct. | Conference Championship |
|---|---|---|---|
| Traverse City West | 104–28 | .788 | 11 |
| Traverse City Central | 87–45 | .659 | 8 |
| Petoskey | 66–66 | .500 | 5 |
| Cadillac | 62–70 | .470 | 4 |
| Gaylord | 58–74 | .439 | 3 |
| Sault Ste. Marie | 16–21 | .432 | 1 |
| Cheboygan | 15–22 | .405 | 0 |
| Ogemaw Heights | 9–21 | .300 | 0 |
| Alpena | 31–101 | .235 | 0 |

=== State Championship Results ===
| Season | Big North | | Non-Big North | | Site | Division | Ref. |
|---|---|---|---|---|---|---|---|
| 2020 | Cadillac (8–3) | 0 | Detroit Country Day (9–2) | 13 | Ford Field • Detroit, MI | 4 | |
| 2021 | Traverse City Central (12–2) | 14 | Warren De La Salle (13–0) | 41 | Ford Field • Detroit, MI | 2 | |

== Boys Basketball Champions ==
| Year | Champion | Record |
|---|---|---|
| 1997–98 | Petoskey | 14–0 |
| 1998–99 | Traverse City Central | 11–3 |
| 1999–00 | Traverse City West | 13–1 |
| 2000–01 | Cadillac | 13–1 |
| 2001–02 | Traverse City Central | 12–2 |
| 2002–03 | Cadillac/Petoskey/Traverse City West | 11–3 |
| 2003–04 | Cadillac/Petoskey | 12–2 |
| 2004–05 | Traverse City Central | 8–2 |
| 2005–06 | Traverse City West | 9–1 |
| 2006–07 | Cadillac/Petoskey | 7–3 |
| 2007–08 | Alpena | 8–2 |
| 2008–09 | Cadillac/Gaylord | 8–2 |
| 2009–10 | Petoskey | 10–0 |
| 2010–11 | Petoskey | 10–0 |
| 2011–12 | Petoskey | 11–1 |
| 2012–13 | Cadillac/Petoskey/Traverse City West | 9–3 |
| 2013–14 | Alpena | 11–1 |
| 2014–15 | Alpena | 11–1 |
| 2015–16 | Petoskey | 12–0 |
| 2016–17 | Traverse City West | 9–1 |
| 2017–18 | Petoskey | 9–1 |
| 2018–19 | Petoskey/Traverse City Central | 7–3 |
| 2019–20 | Cadillac/Traverse City Central | 8–2 |
| 2020–21 | Traverse City Central | 9–0 |
| 2021–22 | Cadillac/Traverse City Central | 7–3 |

=== Conference Records ===
| Team | Big North Record | Pct. | Conference Championship |
|---|---|---|---|
| Traverse City West | 175–112 | .610 | 5 |
| Traverse City Central | 170–117 | .592 | 7 |
| Petoskey | 196–91 | .683 | 11 |
| Cadillac | 192–95 | .669 | 8 |
| Gaylord | 78–206 | .275 | 1 |
| Sault Ste. Marie | 11–87 | .112 | 0 |
| Cheboygan | 28–70 | .286 | 0 |
| Ogemaw Heights | 7–53 | .117 | 0 |
| Alpena | 134–158 | .469 | 3 |

== Girls Basketball Champions ==
| Year | Champion | Record |
|---|---|---|
| 1997 | Sault Ste. Marie | 13–1 |
| 1998 | Sault Ste. Marie | 13–0 |
| 1999 | Petoskey | 13–1 |
| 2000 | Sault Ste. Marie | 14–0 |
| 2001 | Cadillac | 13–1 |
| 2002 | Traverse City West | 12–2 |
| 2003 | Traverse City West | 14–0 |
| 2004 | Traverse City Central | 10–0 |
| 2005 | Traverse City West | 10–0 |
| 2006 | Alpena | 8–2 |
| 2007–08 | Traverse City West | 9–1 |
| 2008–09 | Traverse City Central | 9–1 |
| 2009–10 | Petoskey/Traverse City West | 9–1 |
| 2010–11 | Petoskey | 10–0 |
| 2011–12 | Traverse City West | 10–2 |
| 2012–13 | Petoskey | 10–1 |
| 2013–14 | Cadillac | 11–1 |
| 2014–15 | Traverse City West | 12–0 |
| 2015–16 | Traverse City Central | 11–1 |
| 2016–17 | Traverse City Central | 8–2 |
| 2017–18 | Petoskey | 8–2 |
| 2018–19 | Cadillac | 10–0 |
| 2019–20 | Cadillac | 10–0 |
| 2020–21 | Cadillac | 8–1 |
| 2021–22 | Petoskey | 8–2 |
| 2022–23 | Petoskey | 9–1 |

=== Conference Records ===
| Team | Big North Record | Pct. | Conference Championship |
|---|---|---|---|
| Traverse City West | 177–119 | .598 | 7 |
| Traverse City Central | 168–130 | .564 | 4 |
| Petoskey | 152–146 | .510 | 7 |
| Cadillac | 180–117 | .610 | 5 |
| Gaylord | 110–186 | .372 | 0 |
| Sault Ste. Marie | 72–25 | .742 | 3 |
| Cheboygan | 47–51 | .480 | 0 |
| Ogemaw Heights | 4–55 | .068 | 0 |
| Alpena | 103–192 | .349 | 1 |
