= Gaylord High School =

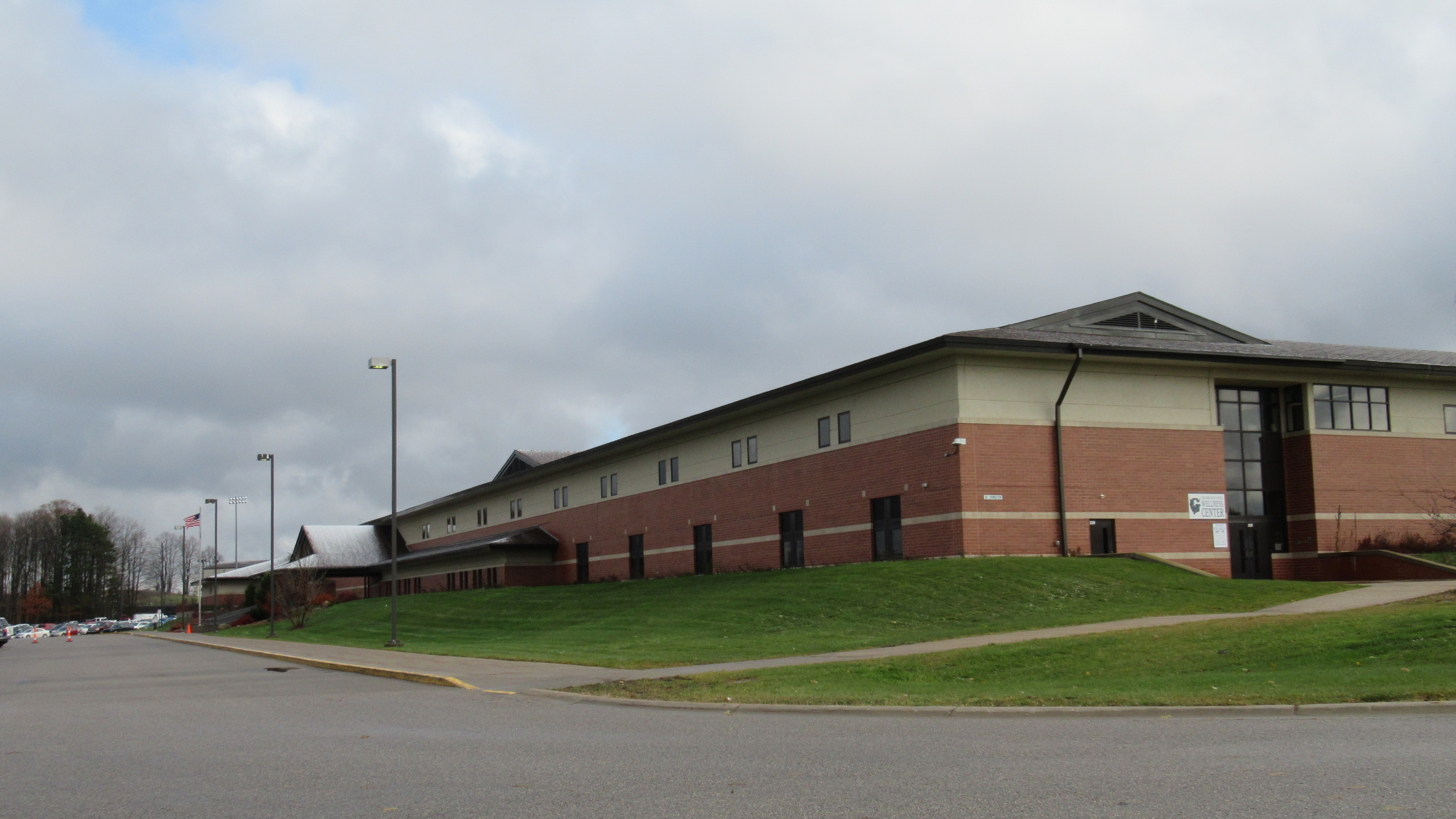
- Exterior of Gaylord High School

Location
- 90 Livingston Boulevard; Gaylord, Michigan 49735; United States
- Coordinates: 45°02′47″N 84°40′16″W

Information
- Type: Public secondary school
- School district: Gaylord Community Schools
- Principal: Sean Byram
- Teaching staff: 47.80 (on an FTE basis)
- Grades: 9-12
- Enrollment: 933 (2023-2024)
- Student to teacher ratio: 19.52
- Colors: Blue; Gold
- Athletics: MHSAA Class A
- Athletics conference: Big North Athletic Conference
- Nickname: Blue Devils
- Rival: Petoskey High School
- Website: ghs.gaylordschools.com/o/ghs

Gaylord High School (GHS) is a public secondary school in Gaylord, Michigan. It serves grades 9-12 for Gaylord Community Schools. As of the 2024 school year, the principal is Sean Byram.

== Academics ==
The school offers multiple Advanced Placement classes including AP English, AP American History, AP Government, AP World History: Modern, AP Biology, and AP Calculus.

== Demographics ==
The demographic breakdown of the 1,025 students enrolled in 2018-19 was:

- Male - 49.9%
- Female - 50.1%
- Native American - 1.1%
- Asian - 0.7%
- Black - 1.0%
- Hispanic - 2.4%
- White - 93.4%
- Multiracial - 1.5%

In addition, 44.9% of students were eligible for reduced-price or free lunch.

== Athletics ==
Gaylord's Blue Devils participate in the Big North Athletic Conference. Its school colors are blue and gold. The following Michigan High School Athletic Association (MHSAA) sanctioned sports are offered:

- Baseball (boys)
- Basketball (girls and boys)
- Bowling (girls and boys)
- Competitive cheerleading (girls)
- Cross country (girls and boys)
- Football (boys)
- Golf (boys)
- Ice hockey (boys)
- Skiing (girls and boys)
- Soccer (girls and boys)
- Softball (girls) 2023, 2024
- Swim and dive (girls)
- Track and field (girls and boys)
- Volleyball (girls)
- Wrestling (boys)

== Notable alumni ==
- Claude E. Shannon - mathematician, electrical engineer, father of Information Theory
