= WSH =

WSH may refer to:

- Windows Script Host, in computing
- World Series Hockey, a hockey tournament
- Sports teams based in Washington, DC, US:
  - Washington Commanders, American football
  - Washington Wizards, basketball
  - Washington Nationals, baseball
  - Washington Capitals, hockey
- Western Steppe Herders, an archaeogenetic lineage
- Traverse City West Senior High School, Michigan, US
