= Sault Area High School =

American high school in Michigan

Sault Area High School and Career Center

Location
- 904 Marquette Avenue; Sault Ste. Marie, Michigan 49783; United States; 46°28′40″N 84°20′37″W

Information
- School type: Public, magnet high school
- School district: Sault Ste. Marie Area Public Schools
- Superintendent: Amy Scott-Kronemeyer
- Principal: Jeanine Sherman
- Teaching staff: 26.76 (on an FTE basis)
- Grades: 9-12
- Enrollment: 734 (2023-2024)
- Student to teacher ratio: 27.43
- Colors: Navy blue White
- Athletics: MHSAA Class B
- Athletics conference: Straits Area Conference; Big North Conference (football only)
- Team name: Blue Devils
- Yearbook: The Northern Light
- Website: High school website

Student assessments
- 2021–22 school year Change vs. prior year

M-STEP 11th grade proficiency rates (Science / Social Studies)
- Advanced %: 11.9 / 10.9
- Proficient %: 25.2 / 34.0
- PR. Proficient %: 17.6 / –
- Not Proficient %: 45.3 / ≤5

Average test scores
- SAT Total: 991.3 (▼ −2)

Sault Area High School and Career Center is a public, magnet high school in Sault Ste. Marie, Michigan. It serves grades 9 to 12. It is a part of Sault Area Public Schools. The current principal is Jeanine Sherman.

== Demographics ==
The demographic breakdown of the 734 students enrolled in 2018-19 was:

- Male - 51.9%
- Female - 48.1%
- Native American - 35.0%
- Asian - 1.1%
- Black - 0.7%
- Hispanic - 1.4%
- Pacific Islander - 0.4%
- White - 60.8%
- Multiracial - 0.7%

48.4% of students were eligible for reduced-price or free lunch.

== Notable alumni ==
- Jeff Blashill, head coach of the Chicago Blackhawks
- Rosalynn Bliss, mayor of Grand Rapids, Michigan from 2016-2025
