= Chasten Buttigieg =

American teacher and writer (born 1989)

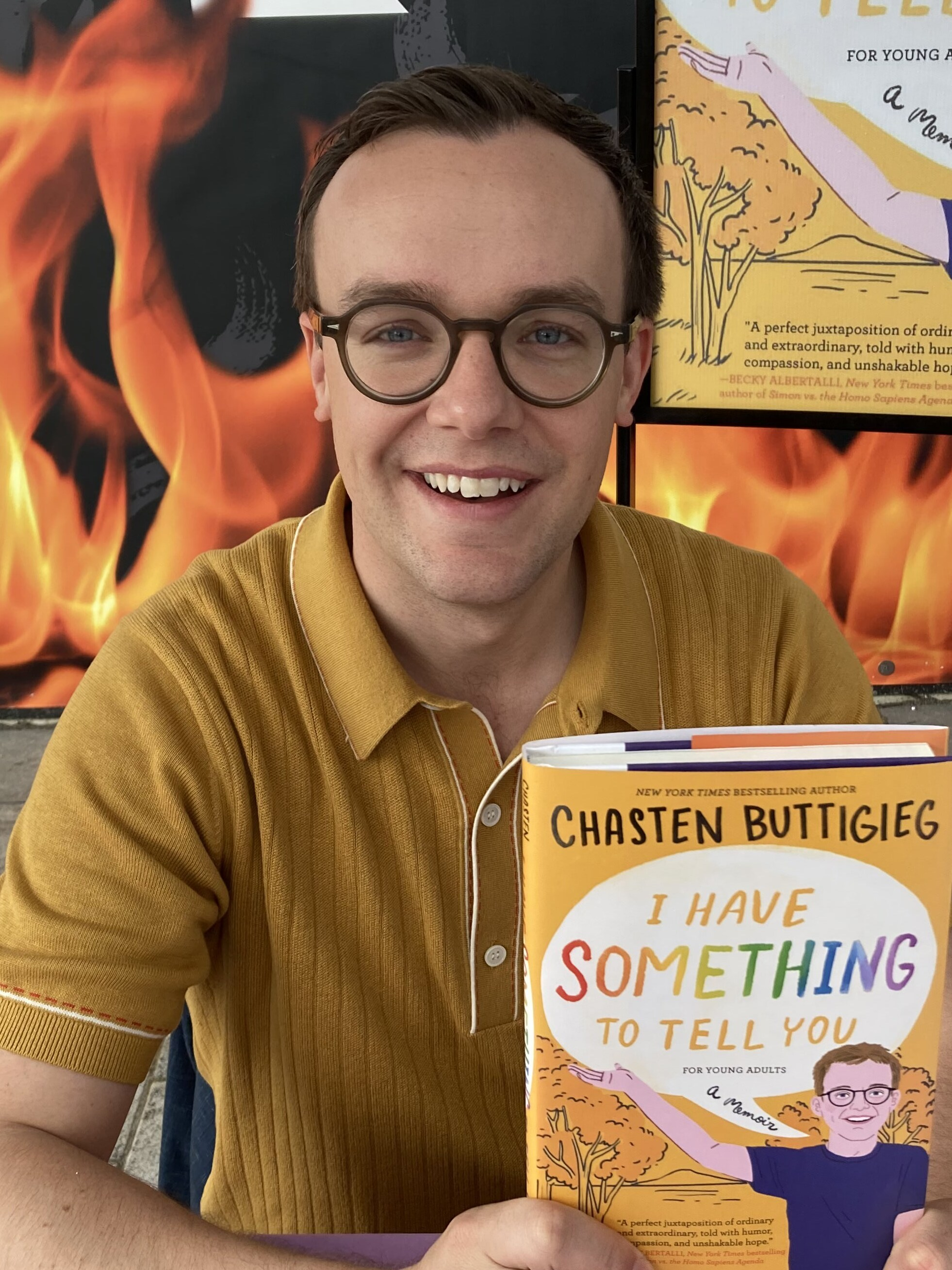
- Buttigieg in 2023

First Gentleman of South Bend, Indiana
- In role June 16, 2018 – January 1, 2020
- Mayor: Pete Buttigieg
- Preceded by: Peg Luecke (as First Lady)
- Succeeded by: Kellye Mitros Mueller (as First Lady)

Personal details
- Born: Chasten James Glezman; June 23, 1989 (age 37) Traverse City, Michigan, U.S.
- Party: Democratic
- Spouse: Pete Buttigieg (m. 2018)
- Children: 2
- Education: Northwestern Michigan College; University of Wisconsin–Eau Claire (BA); DePaul University (MEd)
- Occupation: Teacher; writer; LGBTQ rights advocate
- Writing career
- Notable works: I Have Something to Tell You (2020); I Have Something to Tell You — For Young Adults (2023); Papa's Coming Home picture book (2025)

Chasten James Glezman Buttigieg (/ˈtʃæstən ˈbuːtɪdʒədʒ/ CHAS-tən BOO-tij-əj; né Glezman; born June 23, 1989) is an American author, LGBTQ activist, and former teacher. He is married to Pete Buttigieg, the former U.S. Secretary of Transportation, and was an advisor, spokesperson, and social media campaigner during his husband's 2020 presidential campaign. In September 2020, Buttigieg released a memoir titled I Have Something to Tell You. He published an adaptation of his memoir for young adults in May 2023. In May 2025, he published a picture book, Papa's Coming Home.

== Early life and education ==
Buttigieg was born Chasten James Glezman, on June 23, 1989, in Traverse City, Michigan, to Sherri (née Pelon) and Terry Glezman, owners of a landscaping business. The youngest of three brothers, he was raised in Chums Corner, a suburban area outside Traverse City, in a conservative Catholic family. As a teenager, Buttigieg worked at a cherry products store called Cherry Republic and drove tractors on his grandfather's cherry farm in Suttons Bay. He won a blue ribbon in pit spitting at the National Cherry Festival.

Buttigieg attended Traverse City West Senior High School and spent his senior year as an exchange student in Germany. He took classes at Northwestern Michigan College before attending the University of Wisconsin–Eau Claire; he graduated in 2014 with a bachelor's degree in theater and global studies. Later, Buttigieg attended DePaul University in Chicago where he received a Master of Education degree in 2017. That summer, Buttigieg began an AMS/MACTE certificate from Xavier University.

== Career ==
After graduating from college, Buttigieg moved to Milwaukee, where he worked as a teaching artist for First Stage Children's Theater as well as in classroom settings in the greater Milwaukee area.

While pursuing his graduate degree, he was a substitute teacher in both Chicago and South Bend public schools. In fall 2017, Buttigieg began as a junior high humanities teacher at the Montessori Academy in Mishawaka, Indiana. He also taught theater and ran a diversity club. He took a leave of absence to support his husband's campaign. In January 2019, Buttigieg joined the Civic Education Team of the South Bend Civic Theatre as the director of curriculum.

In 2016, Buttigieg was a state Democratic delegate for St. Joseph County. He was the first gentleman of South Bend, Indiana, from June 16, 2018, to January 1, 2020.

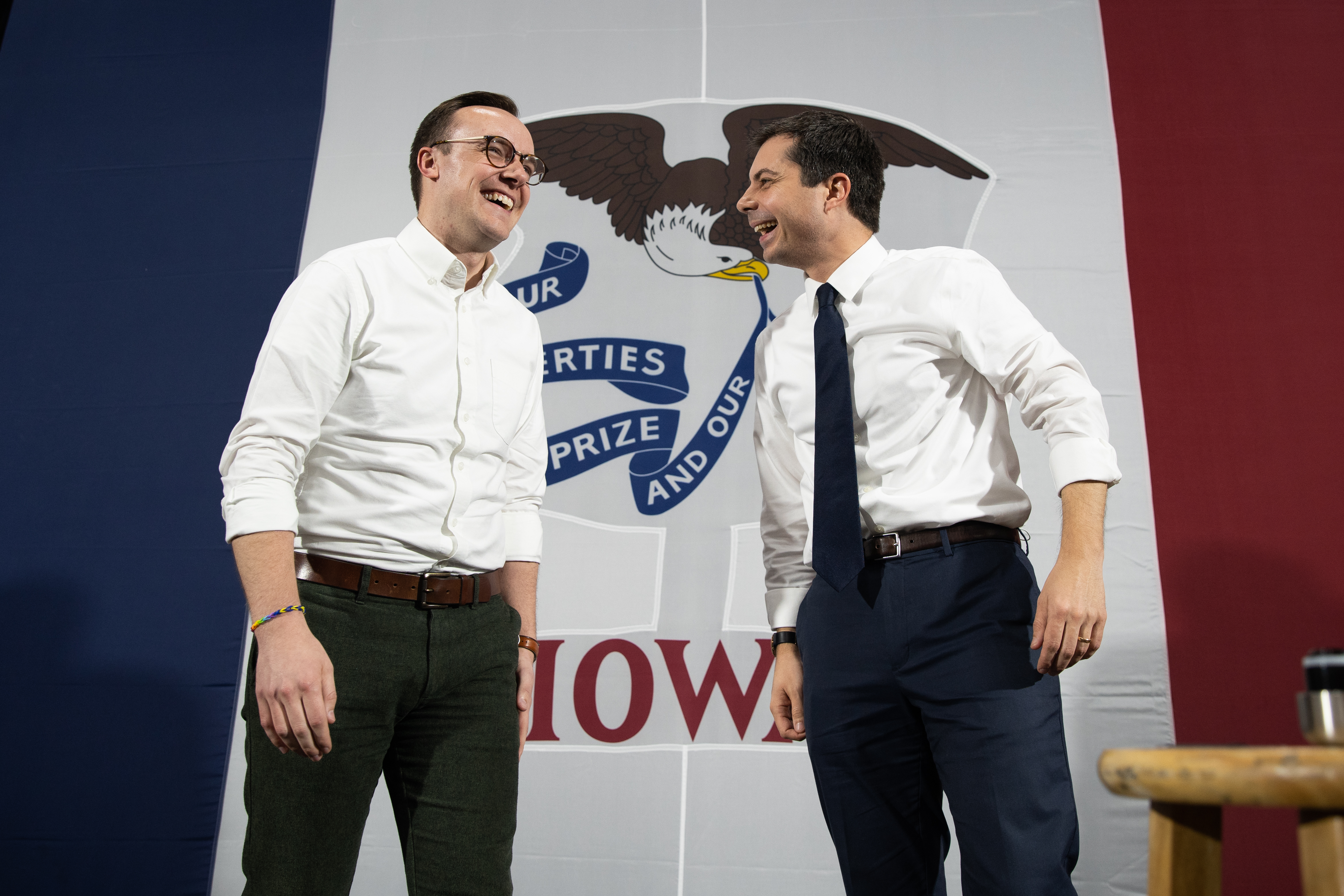
Chasten (left) and Pete Buttigieg campaigning in Iowa in 2019

Buttigieg was a campaign spokesperson, advisor, and social media campaigner for his husband Pete Buttigieg's 2020 presidential campaign. If his husband had been elected, Chasten identified improving the nation's public schools, arts education, and mental health as the areas he would have directed his attention towards as First Gentleman. He also supports LGBTQ rights. After his husband's withdrawal from the race, both endorsed Joe Biden and campaigned for him. Since the campaign, Buttigieg now considers Kamala Harris and Doug Emhoff close friends.

Buttigieg was a Harvard Institute of Politics Fellow for the fall 2020 virtual semester. In December 2020, Buttigieg criticized Joseph Epstein's op-ed about Jill Biden's academic credentials, calling it sexist.

On September 1, 2020, Buttigieg released his debut memoir, I Have Something to Tell You. The hardcover edition debuted at number 12 on The New York Times Best Seller list for hardcover non-fiction. He published an adaptation of I Have Something to Tell You for young adults in 2023. The adaptation "focuses mostly on his youth and not on his adult life with Mayor Pete," according to Kirkus Reviews. In 2025, he published a children's picture book about a family with two fathers, titled Papa's Coming Home.

== Personal life ==
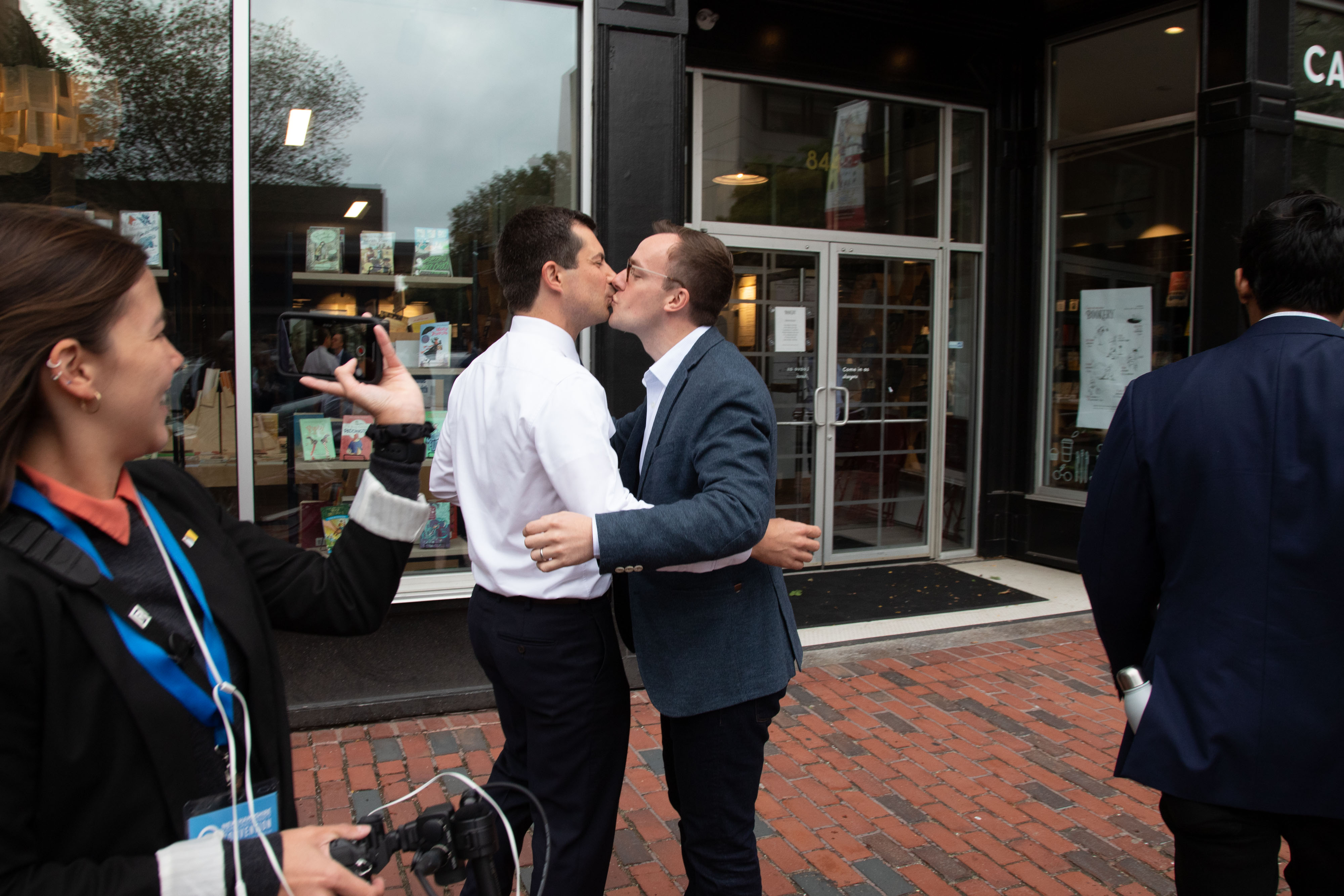
Pete and Chasten Buttigieg in 2019

Buttigieg came out to his family at 18 and soon moved out, living with friends and in his car before returning home about two months later. In 2019, Buttigieg reported he now had a "great relationship" with his parents. In 2020, Buttigieg shared in his memoir that he was sexually assaulted by a friend of a friend when he was 18. The experience left him feeling ashamed for years.

Chasten and Pete Buttigieg first met on the dating app Hinge in the summer of 2015. They met in person that August while Chasten was in graduate school. They got engaged in December 2017 at O'Hare International Airport, and married on June 16, 2018, at the Episcopal Cathedral of St. James in South Bend; the two appeared at the South Bend Gay Pride block party following their nuptials. On August 17, 2021, Buttigieg announced on his personal Twitter account that he and his husband had become parents. On September 4, Pete Buttigieg tweeted a photo of the couple with their adopted newborn twins, a boy and a girl.

== Published works ==
- I Have Something to Tell You: A Memoir (2020)
- I Have Something to Tell You — For Young Adults (2023)
- Papa's Coming Home (picture book) (2025)
