= Sault Area Public Schools =

Public school district in Michigan

Sault Sainte Marie Area Public Schools

Address
- 876 Marquette Avenue Sault Sainte Marie, Chippewa, Michigan, 49783; United States

District information
- Grades: Pre-Kindergarten-12
- Superintendent: Amy Scott-Kronemeyer
- Schools: 6
- Budget: $29,184,000 2022-2023 expenditures
- NCES District ID: 2630990

Students and staff
- Students: 1,806 (2024-2025)
- Teachers: 115.58 (on an FTE basis) (2024-2025)
- Staff: 264.24 FTE (2024-2025)
- Student–teacher ratio: 15.63 (2024-2025)

Other information
- Website: www.saultschools.org

Sault Sainte Marie Area Public Schools, also known as Sault Area Public Schools, is a public school district in the Upper Peninsula of Michigan. It serves Sault Ste. Marie, Soo Township, Sugar Island Township, most of Bruce Township, and portions of Dafter Township.

== History ==
=== 1874 to 1970 ===
Sault Sainte Marie had only a parochial school system until 1874, when a public school district was established. By 1880, there were seven public schools that went to grade eight. In fall 1884, a high school opened in a building that also housed grades four through eight. The first class graduated in 1887.

West End School was built in 1890 at the corner of Magazine and Ridge Streets. The building was moved to a different site in 1900 and Park School was built in its place. The high school was enlarged in 1892.

A new high school opened in February 1917, and the former high school became a school for grades seven and eight. The 1917 high school featured a swimming pool, gymnasium, six career and technical education rooms (then called manual training rooms) and a 1,265-seat auditorium. Other schools in use in 1917 included Garfield School, built in 1897, and the 1902 Lincoln School, at the corner of Adams and Minneapolis, and Washington School (built in 1896 on Pine Street), McKinley School (built 1905 after the first McKinley School burned), and Jefferson School. Garfield, Park, Lincoln, Washington, and McKinley were brick elementary schools, and Jefferson School was a four-room frame building.

Fires were a major problem for the school district. The high school burned down in 1920, and students were transferred to other district buildings, as well as the courthouse and library. The high school was rebuilt on the same foundation and reopened in 1921. The junior high school then burned in May 1926, and was replaced in 1928. Jefferson School burned in 1928 and was replaced in 1932. Park School burned in April 1940 and Malcolm Elementary was built on the same foundation, opening in April 1941.

=== 1970 to present ===
The current high school opened in 1970. It includes extra facilities to serve as a career and skills training center for the three counties in the eastern Upper Peninsula. Garfield Elementary moved into the former junior high school, which moved into the former high school. Loretto Central Catholic High School, built around 1964, closed in 1971, and the district immediately began renting space in its building to relieve overcrowding at the new high school. The district purchased Loretto High later that year, and it ultimately became the district's junior high school in 1979.

Several elementary schools have closed due to declining enrollment, including Finlayson, which was built in 1962 and closed in 1982.

In 2021 all members of the board of education voted to make Amy Scott-Kronemeyer the superintendent.

Lincoln Elementary (rebuilt in 1951 on Fifth Street) and Washington Elementary (rebuilt in 1955 on Ryan Street) both closed at the end of the 2024-2025 school year. The Sault Area Middle School, at 684 Marquette Avenue, then became an elementary school as middle school students were transferred to the high school building.

== Schools ==
Schools in Sault Ste. Marie Area Public Schools district
School	Address	Notes
Sault Area High School & Career Center	904 Marquette Ave., Sault Ste. Marie	Grades 9-12; built 1970
Malcolm High School	5788 South M-129, Sault Ste. Marie	Alternative high school; grades 9-12
Sault Area Middle School	904 Marquette Avenue, Sault Ste. Marie	Shares a building with Sault Area High School
Sault Area Elementary	684 Marquette Avenue, Sault Ste. Marie	
