= Ryan Hayes (American football) =

American football player (born 2000)

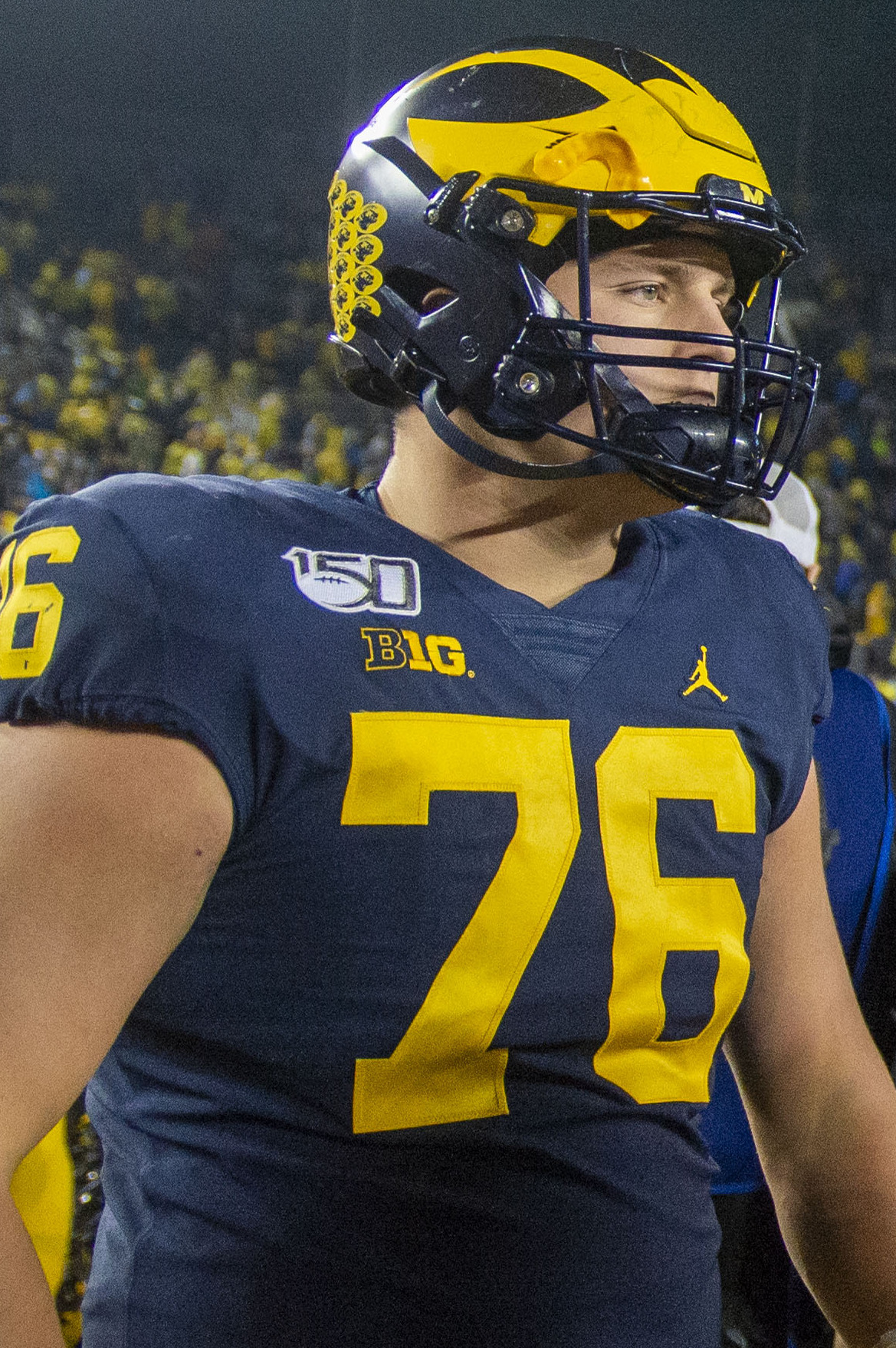
- Hayes with the Michigan Wolverines in 2019

Profile
- Position: Offensive tackle

Personal information
- Born: February 28, 2000 (age 26); Traverse City, Michigan, U.S.
- Listed height: 6 ft 7 in (2.01 m)
- Listed weight: 305 lb (138 kg)

Career information
- High school: Traverse City West
- College: Michigan (2018–2022)
- NFL draft: 2023: 7th round, 238th overall pick

Career history
- Miami Dolphins (2023)*; Indianapolis Colts (2023); Miami Dolphins (2023–2024); Atlanta Falcons (2025)*; Tennessee Titans (2026)*; Carolina Panthers (2026)*
- * Offseason or practice squad member only

Awards and highlights
- 2× second-team All-Big Ten (2021, 2022)

Career NFL statistics as of 2024
- Games played: 1
- Stats at Pro Football Reference

Ryan Michael Hayes (born February 28, 2000) is an American professional football offensive tackle. He played college football for the Michigan Wolverines.

== Early life ==
Hayes attended Traverse City West Senior High School where he was a two-way, three-sport athlete in high school. He played basketball, baseball and football, where he was as an all-state tight end and defensive end. He was a four-star recruit and ranked as the No. 10 offensive tackle in the nation. He received offers from Michigan, Michigan State, Notre Dame, TCU, Vanderbilt and Virginia.

== College career ==
Hayes enrolled at Michigan in 2018, but did not appear in any games. Prior to his sophomore season, head coach Jim Harbaugh announced that Hayes would back up Jalen Mayfield and Jon Runyan Jr. As a sophomore in 2019, he played 12 games on the offensive line, including two starts. He made his collegiate debut on August 31, 2019, in a game against Middle Tennessee. He started at left tackle in place of fifth-year senior Runyan, who sat out due to an injury. He was the team's swing tackle after Runyan returned from injury. As a junior in 2020, he started the first two games at left tackle, however, he missed the remainder of the season due to injury, in a season that was shortened due to the COVID-19 pandemic.

As a senior in 2021 he started all 14 games at left tackle and helped lead the offensive line with the fewest sacks allowed (10) and third-fewest tackles for loss (27) nationally and won the Joe Moore Award. Following the season he was named second-team All-Big Ten. As a graduate student in 2022, he started 11 games, after missing the first game of the season due to injury. He helped lead the offensive line with 12 sacks allowed and a 5.97 sack-adjusted yards per carry, and again won the Joe Moore Award. Following the season he was again named second-team All-Big Ten. On November 21, 2022, he accepted an invite to the Senior Bowl.

== Professional career ==
Pre-draft measurables
Height	Weight	Arm length	Hand span	Wingspan	40-yard dash	10-yard split	20-yard split	20-yard shuttle	Three-cone drill	Vertical jump	Broad jump
6 ft 6 3/8 in (1.99 m)	298 lb (135 kg)	32 1/2 in (0.83 m)	10 in (0.25 m)	6 ft 7 in (2.01 m)	5.18 s	1.78 s	2.93 s	4.68 s	7.39 s	30.0 in (0.76 m)	8 ft 7 in (2.62 m)
All values from NFL Combine/Pro Day

=== Miami Dolphins (first stint) ===
Hayes was drafted by the Miami Dolphins in the seventh round, 238th overall, in the 2023 NFL draft. He was waived on August 29, 2023.

=== Indianapolis Colts ===
Hayes was claimed off waivers by the Indianapolis Colts on August 30, 2023. He was waived by Indianapolis on September 19.

=== Miami Dolphins (second stint) ===
On September 22, 2023, Hayes was signed to the Dolphins practice squad. He signed a reserve/future contract with Miami on January 15, 2024.

Hayes was waived/injured by the Dolphins on August 27, 2024. He was re-signed to the team's practice squad on November 6. He signed a reserve/future contract with Miami on January 7, 2025.

On August 26, 2025, Hayes was waived by the Dolphins as a part of final roster cuts.

=== Atlanta Falcons ===
On August 28, 2025, Hayes was signed to the Atlanta Falcons' practice squad.

=== Tennessee Titans ===
On February 17, 2026, Hayes signed a reserve/futures contract with the Tennessee Titans. On July 23, he was waived by the Titans.

=== Carolina Panthers ===
On July 24, 2026, Hayes was claimed off waivers by the Carolina Panthers. He was waived/injured by the team on August 29. On September 3, Hayes was waived by the Panthers with an injury settlement.

== Personal life ==
His father Mike played football and mother Sue played basketball at Central Michigan. His older brother Connor played football at Pittsburgh.
