= Julius H. Steinberg =

Julius H. Steinberg (1847–1923) was a businessman and theatre entrepreneur in Michigan, United States.

Steinberg was born February 18, 1847, in Suwałki, Russian Poland. To avoid conscription he emigrated in 1868 to Traverse City, Michigan, not yet a village at the time, and became the first Jew to settle there. Together with his wife Mary (Marion Starska, who arrived four years after her husband), Julius established a mercantile business and raised seven children. The store, which remained in the Steinberg family for over 50 years, closed in 1922 as the J.H. Steinberg Store. In 1891 Julius built the Steinberg's Grand Opera House above the store with a seating capacity of 700–800 at a cost of $60,000. The first production occurred in 1894 starring Walker Whiteside, a leading American actor, in Hamlet. Movies were shown in the opera house for a short time until a Michigan law was passed in 1915 forbidding the showing of movies in second floor theaters. Consequently, Julius Steinberg built the Lyric Theater next to the opera house in 1916; the Lyric Theater was remodeled in 1950 and renamed the State Theatre, which is still active.

Steinberg died on April 4, 1923, in Detroit after a short illness and was interred at the Machpelah Cemetery in Ferndale, Michigan.
