= Nub's Nob =

Ski area in Michigan, United States

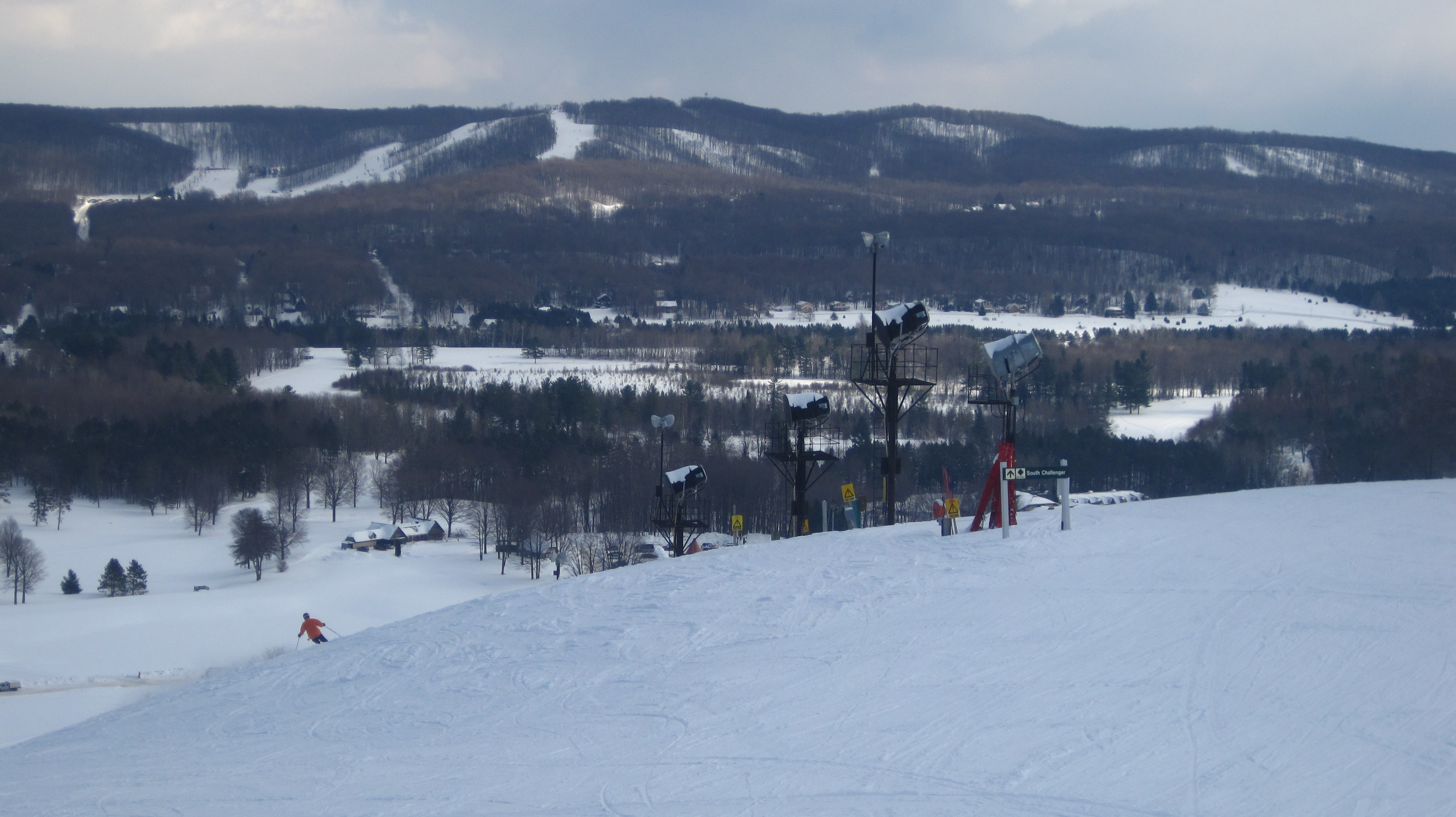
- Nub's Nob ski area, as seen from The Highlands at Harbor Springs

- Location within Michigan Location within the United States
- Location: Michigan, United States
- Nearest city: Harbor Springs, Michigan
- Coordinates: 45.47°N 84.903°W
- Vertical: 427 ft (130 m)
- Top elevation: 1,338 ft (408 m)
- Base elevation: 911 ft (278 m)
- Skiable area: 248 acres (1.0 km^{2})
- Trails: 53
- Longest run: 0.87 miles (1.4 km)
- Lift system: 4 quad chairlifts, 3 triple chairlifts, 1 double chairlift, 1 rope tow, 1 magic carpet
- Lift capacity: 18,275 skiers/hr
- Terrain parks: Yes
- Snowfall: 123 inches (310 cm)
- Snowmaking: Yes (240 acres covered by 320 snow guns)
- Night skiing: Yes
- Website: http://nubsnob.com

Nub's Nob is a ski area in Pleasantview Township, Michigan, United States. It is near Harbor Springs. Opened by Norman and Dorie Sarns in 1958 as a small ski hill, it has sprawled out to a fairly large ski destination with nine lifts. The area gets its name from the nickname of founder Norman "Nubby" Sarns.

== History ==
In the mid-1950s Norman and Dorie Sarns, residents of Cross Village on the coast of Lake Michigan, built a small ski hill to entertain their friends and family. Finding the snow that close to the lake unreliable, they looked for another location further inland and found the present location about 5 miles north of Little Traverse Bay. Tree-cutting, lodge building, and chairlift installing began in 1957, and the resort opened the following year with three trails and one 65-seat chairlift. For the next season, five new runs were added to the area bringing the grand total to 8 trails. A lift control malfunction in late 1961 resulted in numerous injuries and a fatality.

By 1977, the resort had expanded to fourteen trails serviced by four chairlifts, including two new double chairs and a Pomalift. That year Dorie Sarns sold the resort to the present owners, The Pleasantview Ski Corporation (Walter and Alfred Fisher). The new owners further expanded the resort, opening Nubs South in 1979, and started work designing the Nub's Nob snowmaking gun which was patented in 1985. By 1981 there were 21 trails and five chairlifts at the area.

The resort began clearing glades and opening them up to skiing, beginning with the Southern Comfort Glade which opened in 1995. Pintail Peak, about a half-mile (0.8 km) south of the main hill, opened for skiing in 1997, adding twelve trails and a quad chairlift. A year later, night skiing was added to Nubs South, greatly increasing the amount of night skiing terrain. In 2008, a second chairlift was added to Pintail Peak, bringing the area to its current total of 8 chairlifts, one rope tow, and a magic carpet. After the most recent additions of runs Panda Land in 2012 and Outback Jack Glade in 2015, the area reached its current total of 53 runs, consisting primarily of intermediate trails with a fair amount of expert runs (three groomed runs on the front side of the area and seven glades spread over the three peaks) and beginner terrain (found mainly on Nubs South).

In 2020, the blue chairlift closed and in 2021, a covered magic carpet was added to the free beginner area, keeping the total number of lifts at 10.

== Winter activities ==
The area offers cross-country skiing, alpine skiing, and snowboarding. Snowshoeing, ice skating, snow tubing, and snowmobiling are available nearby.
