= I Have Something to Tell You =

2020 memoir by Chasten Buttigieg

- First edition cover
- Author: Chasten Buttigieg
- Language: English
- Genre: Memoir
- Publisher: Atria Books
- Publication date: September 1, 2020
- Publication place: United States
- Media type: Print (hardcover)
- Pages: 256
- ISBN: 978-1-98213-812-7

I Have Something to Tell You is a 2020 memoir by Chasten Buttigieg. It was published by Atria Books in September 2020 and includes topics from his early life in a conservative Midwestern family including sexual assault, domestic violence, and growing up closeted. Buttigieg also details his experiences during his husband's 2020 presidential campaign.

== Content ==
The autobiography describes Buttigieg's early life through his marriage to Pete Buttigieg and his role on Pete's US presidential campaign.

== Reception ==
The hardcover edition debuted at number 12 on The New York Times Best Seller list for hardcover non-fiction.

The book received mixed reviews, with some critics feeling it did not live up to its most promising moments. In The Washington Post, Stephen Petrow wrote, "His book reveals an emotional honesty about his life story, which includes sexual assault, homelessness, estrangement from his family of origin and bullying. His candor is refreshing, and it extends the success he had in humanizing his husband on the campaign trail." He went on, "The blind spot the memoir has for Mayor Pete's lack of support among Black and Latino voters makes the book, which in some ways is so powerful, so ultimately frustrating."
