= Andy Pascoe =

American baseball player and coach

Biographical details
- Born: 1988 (age 36–37); Traverse City, Michigan, U.S.

Playing career
- 2007–2010: Evansville
- Position: Catcher / Infielder

Coaching career (HC unless noted)
- 2011–2015: Evansville (H/RC)
- 2016–2019: Butler (H)
- 2020–2022: Western Illinois

Head coaching record
- Overall: 19–86
- Tournaments: NCAA: 0–0

Accomplishments and honors

Awards
- Second Team All-MVC (2009)

Andrew Pascoe (born 1988) is an American baseball coach and former catcher and infielder. Pascoe played college baseball at the University of Evansville from 2007 to 2010 for coach Wes Carroll. He served as the head coach of the Western Illinois Leathernecks (2020–2022).

== Playing career ==
Pascoe attended Central High School in Traverse City, Michigan where he was a member of the school's baseball team. Upon graduation from high school, was intending to enroll at the University of Evansville to play baseball. After making 11 starts as a freshman, Pascoe became the starting catcher for the Leathernecks during the 2008 season. As a junior in 2009, he was named Second Team All-Missouri Valley Conference following the season.

== Coaching career ==
After graduation, Pascoe became a volunteer assistant at Evansville. During the summer of 2012, he was promoted to a full-time assistant in charge of hitting and recruiting coordinator. In the summer of 2017, Pascoe was named the hitting coach for Dave Schrage at Butler University.

On September 19, 2019, Pascoe was named the seventh head baseball coach in Western Illinois University history.

On June 30, 2022, Pascoe was informed that his contract would not be renewed by Western Illinois. He compiled a record of 19–86 in three seasons as head coach.

Statistics overview
Season	Team	Overall	Conference	Standing	Postseason
Western Illinois Leathernecks (Summit League) (2020–2022)
2020	Western Illinois	0–13	0–0		Season canceled due to COVID-19
2021	Western Illinois	11–29	7–20	5th	Season canceled due to COVID-19
2022	Western Illinois	8–44	5–19	7th	
Western Illinois:		19–86	12–39		
Total:		19–86			
National champion Postseason invitational champion Conference regular season champion Conference regular season and conference tournament champion Division regular season champion Division regular season and conference tournament champion Conference tournament champion
