= The Highlands at Harbor Springs =

Ski area in Michigan, United States

Coordinates: 45°28′15″N 84°56′05″W

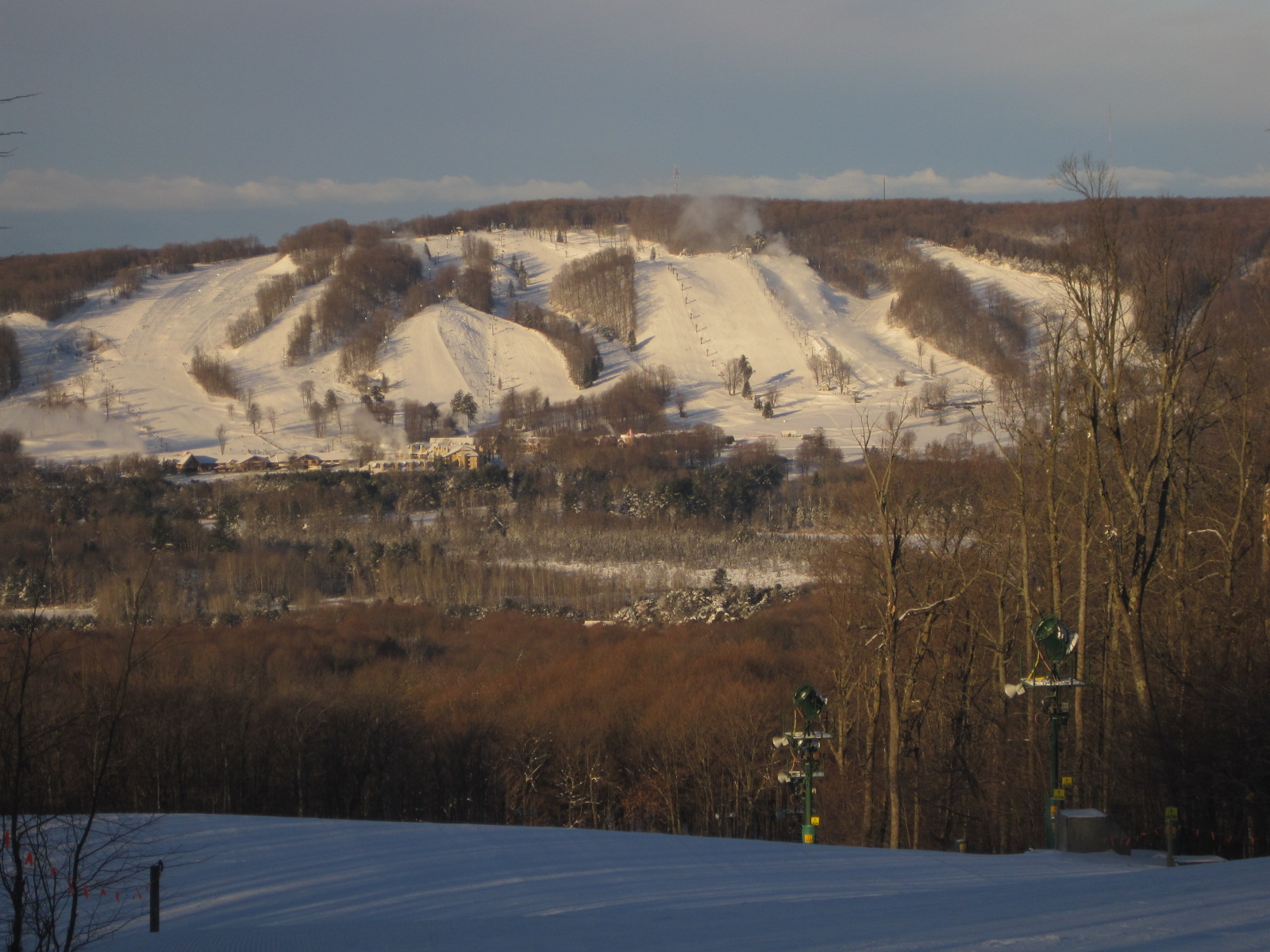
- The Highlands at Harbor Springs, as seen from Nub's Nob in 2012

- Location within Michigan Location within the United States
- Location: Pleasantview Township, Emmet County, Michigan, United States
- Nearest city: Harbor Springs, Michigan
- Status: Operating
- Owner: Boyne Resorts
- Vertical: 525 feet (160 m)
- Top elevation: 1,316 feet (401 m)
- Base elevation: 787 feet (240 m)
- Skiable area: 385 acres (1.56 km^{2})
- Trails: 55
- Lift capacity: 17,800
- Terrain parks: Yes, 3
- Snowmaking: Yes, 93%
- Website: highlandsatharborsprings.com

The Highlands at Harbor Springs is a ski resort in Northern Michigan located near Harbor Springs, Michigan owned and operated by Boyne Resorts. It was known as Boyne Highlands until December 2021 when the resort announced the name change.

== History ==
Harbor Highlands ski resort opened in 1955 with one slope and a single rope tow. Other runs and a lodge were added in following seasons, but the resort did not succeed financially and had to close. The resort was purchased by Boyne in the early 1960s, along with an adjoining 2900 acres to the north. It opened as Boyne Highlands in 1963 with two three-person chairlifts, the first triple chairlifts in the world. The current high-speed detachable quad chairlift, the Heather lift, was installed in 1990. In 1995, the resort expanded in to the North Peak area. A high-speed detachable six-passenger chairlift was installed in 2023, replacing three fixed-grip triple chairs.

Boyne Highlands was re-branded as The Highlands at Harbor Springs in 2021.

The tenth season of The Big Break, The Big Break X: Michigan, was filmed there.
