= Jake Fisher =

American football player (born 1993)

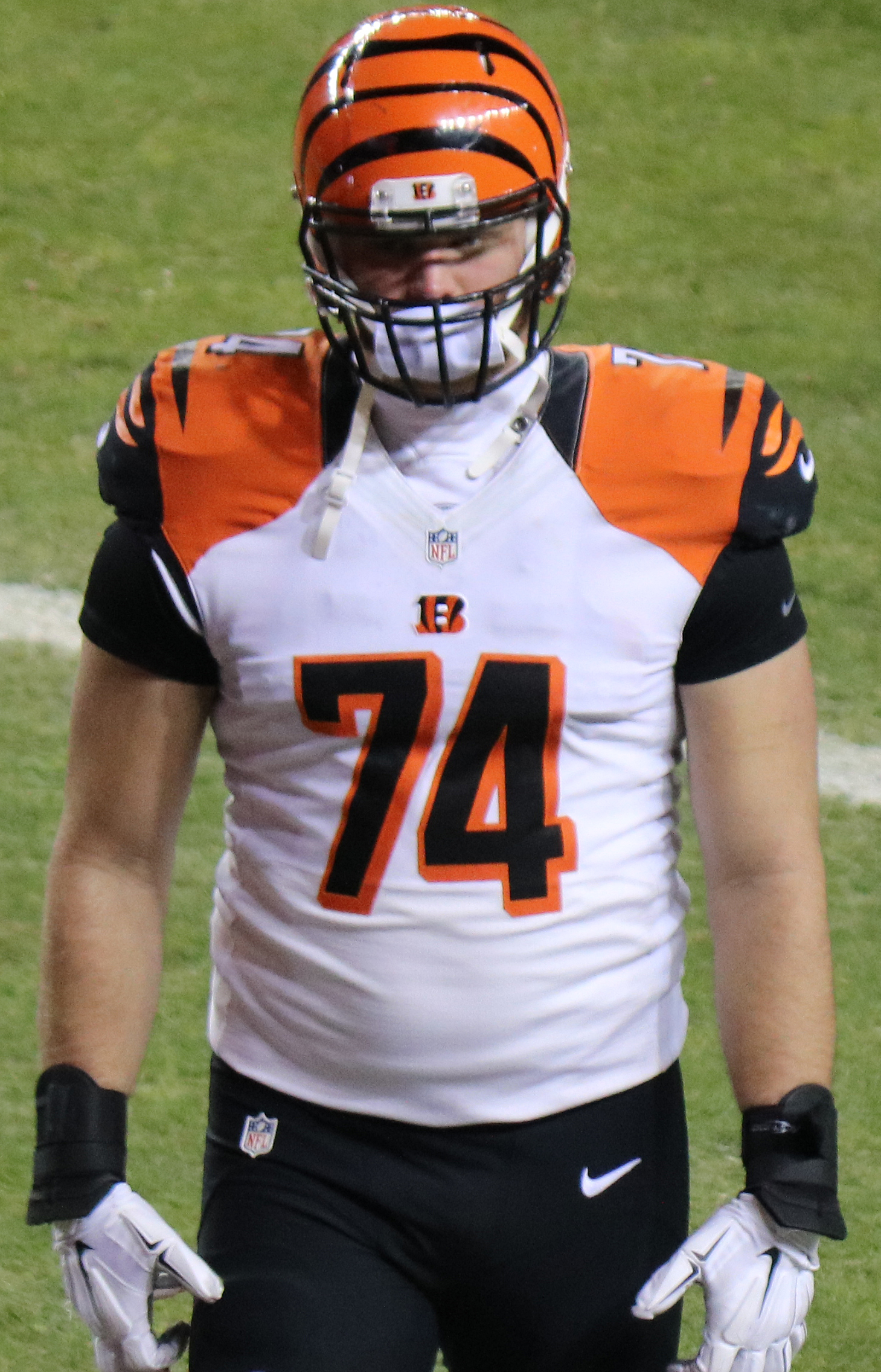
- Fisher with the Cincinnati Bengals in 2015

No. 74, 44, 84
- Position: Offensive tackle

Personal information
- Born: April 23, 1993 (age 33); Traverse City, Michigan, U.S.
- Listed height: 6 ft 6 in (1.98 m)
- Listed weight: 305 lb (138 kg)

Career information
- High school: West (Traverse City)
- College: Oregon
- NFL draft: 2015: 2nd round, 53rd overall pick

Career history
- Cincinnati Bengals (2015–2018); Buffalo Bills (2019)*
- * Offseason or practice squad member only

Awards and highlights
- First-team All-Pac-12 (2014)

Career NFL statistics
- Games played: 48
- Games started: 12
- Receptions: 2
- Receiving yards: 43
- Stats at Pro Football Reference

Jake Fisher (born April 23, 1993) is an American former professional football player who was an offensive tackle in the National Football League (NFL). He played college football for the Oregon Ducks. He was selected by the Cincinnati Bengals in the second round of the 2015 NFL draft.

== Early life ==
Fisher attended Traverse City West Senior High in Traverse City, Michigan. He originally committed to the University of Michigan to play college football but changed his commitment to the University of Oregon.

== College career ==
Fisher played at Oregon from 2011 to 2014. He was named an All-American by the Football Writers Association of America (FWAA) as a senior in 2014.

== Professional career ==
Pre-draft measurables
Height	Weight	Arm length	Hand span	40-yard dash	20-yard shuttle	Three-cone drill	Vertical jump	Bench press
6 ft 6 1/8 in (1.98 m)	306 lb (139 kg)	33 3/4 in (0.86 m)	10 3/8 in (0.26 m)	5.01 s	4.33 s	7.25 s	32.5 in (0.83 m)	25 reps
All values from NFL Combine

=== Cincinnati Bengals ===
Fisher was chosen in the second round (53rd overall) of the 2015 NFL draft by the Cincinnati Bengals. He was drafted as a left tackle and was targeted several times during pass plays. After Bengals' H-back Ryan Hewitt injured his MCL during the regular season, Fisher's number was switched from 74 to 44 so he wouldn't have to check in as an eligible receiver every play he was used as a pass catcher.

Fisher made his debut as an H-back against the Pittsburgh Steelers during the 2015–2016 playoffs. After the season, Fisher switched back to number 74 and began taking reps at center during the Bengals' training camp. With the departure of right tackle Andre Smith, Fisher was the back-up right tackle going into the 2016 regular season. He showed his versatility, getting acquainted with all five offensive line positions.

Fisher came into 2017 as the Bengals' starting right tackle. He started seven out of eight games before leaving midway through the team's Week 9 matchup against the Jacksonville Jaguars. He left with an apparent illness that sent him to the hospital. He was placed on the reserve/non-football illness list on November 8, 2017. The next day, he was diagnosed with an irregular heartbeat and had a procedure to correct the issue.

Fisher entered the 2018 season as a backup tackle after the Bengals acquired Cordy Glenn in a trade to be their left tackle and signed Bobby Hart to be their right tackle. He made his first and only start of the season in Week 12 at left tackle in place of an injured Glenn. He suffered a back injury in the game and was placed on injured reserve on November 29, 2018.

Set to be a free agent in 2019, Fisher dropped his weight to 285 pounds in an effort to convert to a blocking tight end.

=== Buffalo Bills ===
On March 22, 2019, Fisher was signed by the Buffalo Bills as a tight end. He was released on May 13, 2019.
