= South Bend Civic Theatre =

Theatre in South Bend, Indiana, United States

Coordinates: 41.680857°N 86.252413°W

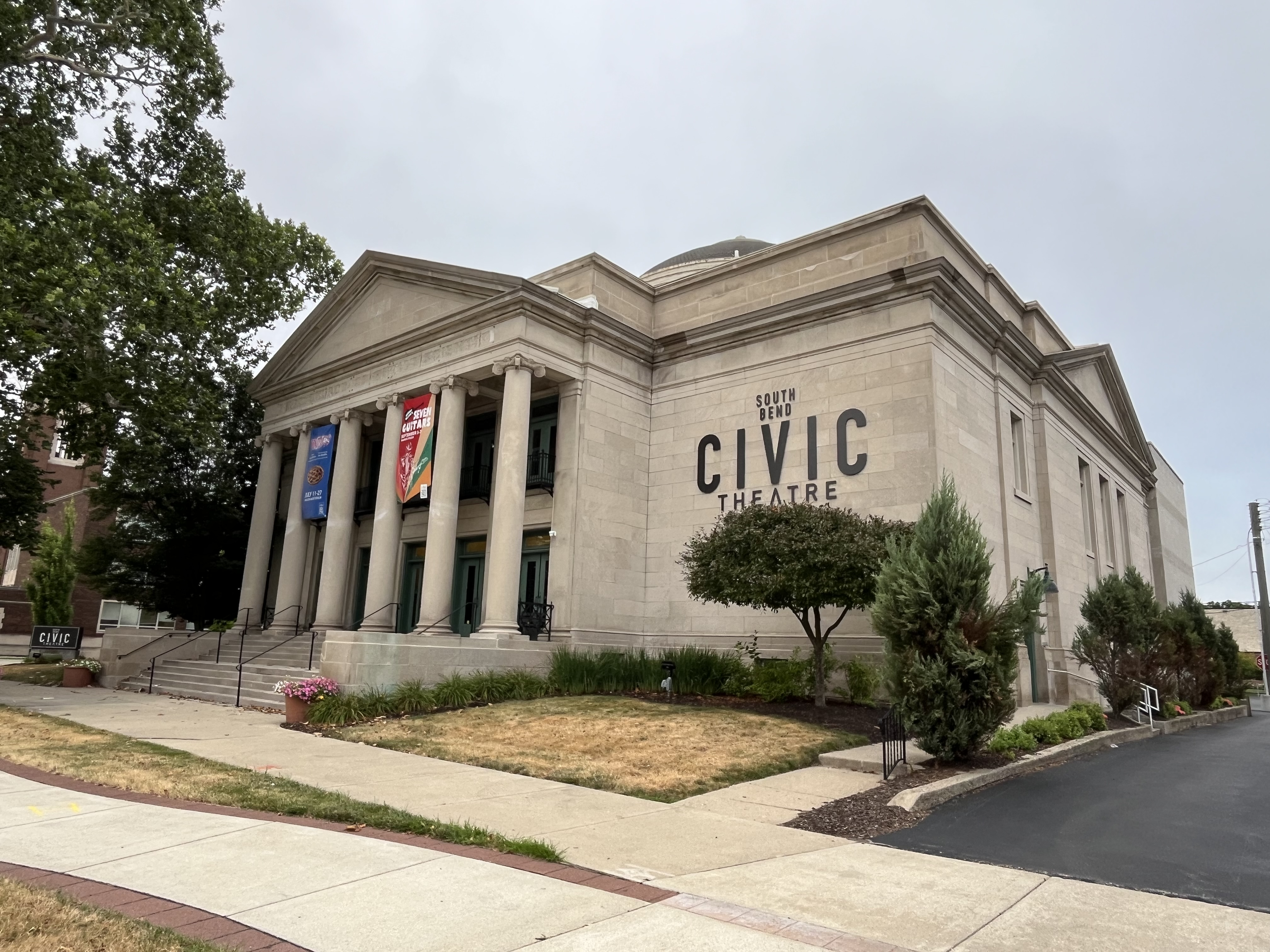
South Bend Civic Theatre

The South Bend Civic Theatre was founded in 1957 in South Bend, Indiana, by two University of Notre Dame graduates. It staged most of its productions after 1968 at The Firehouse, a local historic landmark located at 701 Portage Ave.

In January 2007 a new and much larger theater opened at 403 N. Main Street. The new site includes a 209-seat Auditorium and a 90-seat Studio Theater. The South Bend Civic produces 15 plays per year.
