= Wilson Sawyer =

American composer (1917–1979)

Wilson Sawyer (1917–1979) was an American composer, arranger and musician.

Born in Traverse City, Michigan, he showed musical talent at an early age and studied music at the University of Michigan. Sawyer conducted the University's Women's Glee Club and led the Bill Sawyer Orchestra, a big band that was featured on WMAQ's "Fitch Summer Bandwagon" on July 7, 1940.

== Composing career ==
He composed several arrangements of choral works; popular songs for Perry Como, Fred Waring and Ray Eberle; music for the "Alaskan Stampede," a Leo Seltzer produced "musical extravaganza on ice" c. 1944, and an opera based on Mark Twain's Tom Sawyer.

He is best known for composing Symphony No. 1, known as the Alaskan Symphony, at Gypsy Trail, Carmel, New York in 1945. The work includes text from the "Spell of the Yukon" by Robert W. Service sung by a baritone soloist in the third movement, as well as other thematic inspirations drawn from his study of the climate, topography and history of the then-territory. The Alaskan Symphony was first performed in December 1945 by the American Symphony Orchestra and was broadcast across the United States and to overseas armed services at that time. Wilson Sawyer conducted the piece and Gov. Ernest Gruening of Alaska was guest speaker on the program. At Gruening's request, the original score was placed in the Alaskan Museum of Natural History [Alaska Historical Library and Museum] in Juneau, Alaska.

== Later life ==
In 1960, Sawyer's wife Maxine was diagnosed with spinal cancer and they moved to Pawling, New York where he operated a chicken farm and laundromat. He continued to compose. The Alaskan Symphony was performed by the Hudson Valley Philharmonic in 1975 with Sawyer again conducting even though he had recently suffered a stroke. Sawyer revised the Symphony in 1977, making substantial cuts to the fourth movement among other edits. The revised Alaskan Symphony was premiered by the Juneau Symphony on June 14, 2008, conducted by music director Kyle Wiley Pickett.
