= Eric Gordon (American football) =

American gridiron football player (born 1987)

No. 57
- Position: Linebacker

Personal information
- Born: August 22, 1987 (age 39); Traverse City, Michigan, U.S.
- Listed height: 6 ft 0 in (1.83 m)
- Listed weight: 225 lb (102 kg)

Career information
- High school: Traverse City West (MI)
- College: Michigan State
- NFL draft: 2011: undrafted

Career history
- Jacksonville Jaguars (2011)*; Cleveland Browns (2011)*; Edmonton Eskimos (2012)*
- * Offseason or practice squad member only

Awards and highlights
- Second-team All-Big Ten (2010)

Eric Gordon (born August 22, 1987) is an American former professional football linebacker who played for the Edmonton Eskimos of the Canadian Football League (CFL). He was released by the Edmonton Eskimos on June 3, 2012 and he was signed by the Jaguars as an undrafted free agent in 2011. He played college football at Michigan State where he was a four-year starter. He started 49 of 51 games at linebacker and holds the Michigan State record for the most games as a starter. He ranks among Michigan State's all-time leaders in tackles for loss, tackles, and sacks.
