= Andrea Kritcher =

American nuclear engineer and physicist

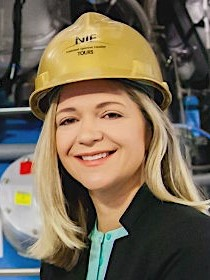
- Born: Andrea Lynn Kritcher
- Education: University of Michigan; University of California, Berkeley
- Scientific career
- Workplaces: Lawrence Livermore National Laboratory
- Thesis: Ultrafast K-alpha Thomson scattering from shock compressed matter for use as a dense matter diagnostic (2009)

Andrea Lynn "Annie" Kritcher is an American nuclear engineer and physicist who works at the Lawrence Livermore National Laboratory. She was responsible for the development of Hybrid-E, a capsule that enables inertial confinement fusion. She was elected Fellow of the American Physical Society in 2022.

She was named to Time 100 in 2023 for her role as leader and designer for the December 5 test in 2022 which achieved fusion ignition for the first time.

== Early life and education ==
Kritcher is a native of Traverse City, Michigan, and attended both Traverse City Central High School and Northwestern Michigan College before studying nuclear engineering at the University of Michigan. She moved to the University of California, Berkeley for graduate studies, where she earned a master's degree and doctorate in nuclear engineering. She spent summer 2004 at the Lawrence Livermore National Laboratory on an internship. Her first project involved analyzing data for the electron beam ion trap. Her doctoral research considered Thomson scattering from shocked compressed matter. She became a postdoctoral researcher at the Lawrence Livermore National Laboratory in 2009. Her postdoctoral research explored using X-rays to measure the properties of warm and hot dense matter (plasma), and measuring how nuclei interact with dense plasma. She made use of the LLNL Jupiter laser and the OMEGA laser at the University of Rochester.

== Research and career ==
Kritcher was made a permanent member of staff in the Weapons and Complex Integration's Design Physics Division of the Lawrence Livermore National Laboratory in 2012.

Kritcher works in nuclear engineering, with a particular focus on inertial confinement fusion, which looks to emulate the nuclear processes that take place in the sun by compressing and heating capsules full of thermonuclear fuel. High energy beams (photons or electrons) bombard the outer layer of the capsule, which explodes outward and generates a reaction force that accelerates the remainder of the capsule toward the center. The explosion creates a shockwave that travels through the fuel target, resulting in sufficient heat and compression for the fusion to begin. These capsules contain heavy isotopes of hydrogen (typically deuterium and tritium). Kritcher designed Hybrid-E, a target capsule that includes a high density carbon capsule and a deuterium-tritium fill tube. The capsule is encased in a hohlraum that converts the incident laser light into x-rays. Kritcher said that it was challenging to design the hohlraum such that it generated a symmetric implosion of the capsule. This involved confining the size of the entrance holes to enhance the energy that is coupled into the system, and a structure that can systematically adjust the wavelength of each beam to balance the X-ray energy required to drive the capsule to implode. The Hybrid-E capsule enabled inertial confinement fusion able to produce more than a megajoule of fusion energy. Hybrid-E represents the first time that it was possible to generate a burning plasma state that emits more energy than the energy required to initiate the fusion.

In 2022, Kritcher was elected Fellow of the American Physical Society. Her citation read, "for leadership in integrated hohlraum design physics leading to the creation of the first laboratory burning and igniting fusion plasma."

Kritcher went on to study the behavior of ions in inertial confinement fusion, showing that the energy of neutrons produced from a deuterium–tritium plasma recorded experimentally was higher than could be predicted from the hydrodynamics-informed algorithms that simulate inertial confinement implosions.

Kritcher was the designer of the December 5, 2022 experiment that achieved fusion breakeven at the National Ignition Facility.

In 2026, Kritcher won the U.S. Department of Energy's Ernest Orlando Lawrence Award in Fusion and Plasma Sciences honoring her role in designing Lawrence Livermore National Laboratory's first successful fusion ignition.

== Awards and honors ==
- 2021 Finalist for Physics Breakthrough of the Year
- 2022 Northwestern Michigan College Outstanding Alumni
- 2022 Falling Walls Winner in Physical Sciences
- 2022 Elected Fellow of the American Physical Society
- 2026 Ernest Orlando Lawrence Award in Fusion and Plasma Sciences

== Selected publications ==
- Andrea L Kritcher; Paul Neumayer; John Castor; et al. (1 October 2008). "Ultrafast x-ray Thomson scattering of shock-compressed matter". Science. 322 (5898): 69–71. Bibcode:2008Sci...322...69K. doi:10.1126/SCIENCE.1161466. ISSN 0036-8075. PMID 18832640.
- Lee HJ; Neumayer P; Castor J; et al. (16 March 2009). "X-ray Thomson-scattering measurements of density and temperature in shock-compressed beryllium". Physical Review Letters. 102 (11) 115001. Bibcode:2009PhRvL.102k5001L. doi:10.1103/PHYSREVLETT.102.115001. ISSN 0031-9007. OSTI 1334272. PMID 19392206.
- John Lindl; Otto Landen; John Edwards; Ed Moses; NIC Team (February 2014). "Review of the National Ignition Campaign 2009-2012". Physics of Plasmas. 21 (2) 020501. Bibcode:2014PhPl...21b0501L. doi:10.1063/1.4865400. ISSN 1070-664X. OSTI 1229813.
