= Harold Sherman =

American novelist (1898–1987)

Harold Morrow Sherman
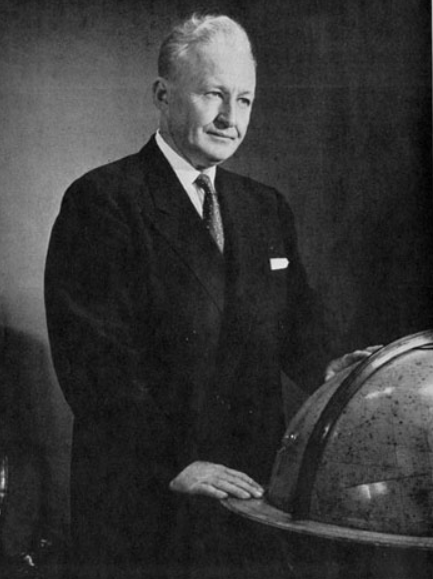
- Harold Sherman c. 1957
- Born: July 13, 1898; Traverse City, Michigan, United States
- Died: August 19, 1987 (aged 89); Mountain View, Arkansas, United States
- Occupations: Novelist, lecturer
- Writing career
- Period: 20th century
- Genre: Adventure novel

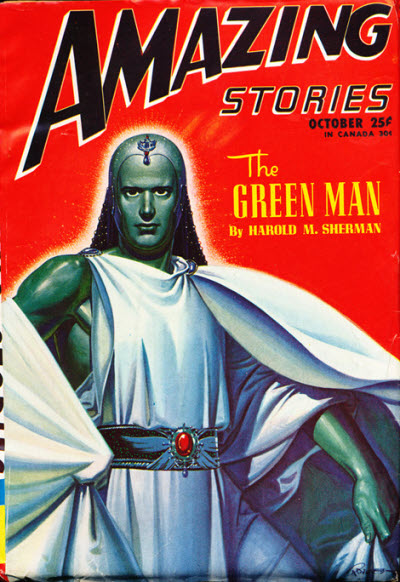
Sherman's novel The Green Man was published in the magazine Amazing Stories during 1946.

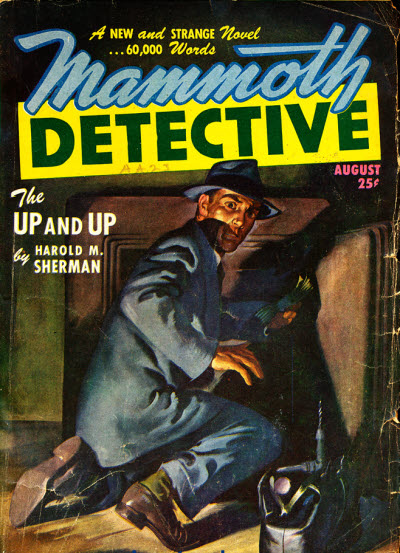
One of Sherman's relatively few mysteries, "The Up And Up", was the cover story for the August 1947 issue of Mammoth Detective.

Harold Morrow Sherman (July 13, 1898 – August 19, 1987) was an American writer, lecturer and psychical researcher.

== Biography ==
Sherman was born on July 13, 1898, in Traverse City, Michigan. He studied at the University of Michigan for a brief time, then relocated to Detroit to work for the Ford Motor Company.

During 1921, Sherman worked as a reporter for the Marion Chronicle in Indiana. He relocated to New York City during 1924 to write several popular boys' sports and adventure books (notably the Tahara series) and to produce two plays on Broadway. During 1941 Sherman wrote a play titled Mark Twain, after being granted exclusive dramatic rights by the Twain Estate. He was then hired by Hollywood producer Jesse L. Lasky to write a treatment of the play for Lasky's upcoming movie The Adventures of Mark Twain, which was released during 1944.

Sherman married Martha Bain on September 26, 1920; they had two daughters. Sherman and his family spent the 1950s and early 1960s living in Hollywood, writing for television and lecturing on his most recent work. Eventually, Sherman and his family relocated to Arkansas, where he lived until his death. He died on August 19, 1987.

== Telepathy experiment ==
Sherman with the explorer Hubert Wilkins performed their own experiment in telepathy for five and a half months starting October 1937. This occurred when Sherman was in New York City and Wilkins was in the Arctic. The experiment consisted of Sherman and Wilkins at the end of each day relaxing and visualizing a mental image or "thought impression" of the events or thoughts they had experienced during the day and then recording those images and thoughts in a diary. The results at the end when comparing Sherman's diary to Wilkins' were claimed to be more than 60 percent agreement.

The full results of the experiments were published during 1942 in a book by Sherman and Wilkins titled Thoughts Through Space. In the book both Sherman and Wilkins had written they believed they had demonstrated that it was possible to send and receive thought impressions from the mind of one person to another. The magician John Booth wrote the experiment was not an example of telepathy as a high percentage of misses had occurred. Booth wrote it was more likely that the "hits" were the result of "coincidence, law of averages, subconscious expectancy, logical inference or a plain lucky guess."

A review of their book in the American Journal of Orthopsychiatry cast doubt on their experiment noting that the fact that "the study was published five years after it was conducted, arouses suspicion on the validity of the conclusions.

== Selected bibliography ==
Sherman's personal papers are archived at the University of Central Arkansas in Conway: http://uca.edu/archives/m87-08-harold-m-sherman-collection/

=== Non-fiction ===
- Your Key to Happiness (1935)
- Thoughts Through Space (with Sir Hubert Wilkins) (1942)
- Your Key to Married Happiness (1944)
- Your Key to Youth Problems (1945)
- Your Key to Romance (1948)
- You Live After Death (1949)
- You Can Stop Drinking (1950)
- Know Your Own Mind (1953)
- Adventures In Thinking (1956)
- TNT, the Power Within You (with Claude Bristol; 1957)
- How To Turn Failure into Success (1958)
- How to Use the Power of Prayer (1958)
- How To Make ESP Work For You (1964)
- How to Solve Mysteries of Your Mind and Soul (1965)
- Wonder Healers of the Philippines (1967)
- Your Mysterious Powers Of ESP (1969)
- How to Foresee and Control Your Future (1970)
- How to Take Yourself Apart and Put Yourself Back Together Again (1971)
- The Harold Sherman ESP Manual (with Ambrose and Olga Worrall; 1972)
- Your Power To Heal (1972)
- You Can Communicate with the Unseen World (1974)
- How to Know What to Believe (1976)
- How to Picture What You Want (1978)
- The Dead Are Alive! (1981)

=== Adventure fiction ===
- Cameron McBain, Backwoodsman (1927)
- Ding Palmer, Air Detective (1930)
- The Land of Monsters (1931)
- Let Freedom Ring! (1932)
- Tahara Among the African Tribes (1933)
- Tahara: Boy King of the Desert (1933)
- Tahara: Boy Mystic of India (1933)
- Tahara in the Land of the Yucatán (1933)
- Call of the Land (1948)

=== Sports fiction ===
- Fight 'Em Big Three (1926)
- Safe! (1928)
- Block That Kick! (1928)
- Hit By Pitcher (1928)
- Over The Line (1929)
- Hit And Run (1929)
- Hold That Line (1930)
- It's A Pass! (1931)
- Strike Him Out (1931)
- Interference (1932)
- Under the Basket (1932)
- Down The Ice (1932)
- Double Play (1932)
- The Tennis Terror (1932)
- Captain of the Eleven (1933)
- One Minute to Play (1926)

=== Fantasy ===
- The Green Man (1946)
- All Aboard for the Moon (1947)
- The Green Man Returns (1947)
- This Way To Heaven (1948)
