= Autumn Rademacher =

American college basketball coach (born 1975)

Biographical details
- Born: September 7, 1975 (age 51); Traverse City, Michigan, U.S.

Playing career
- 1993–1997: Detroit

Coaching career (HC unless noted)
- 1997–2004: Western Michigan (asst.)
- 2004–2008: Green Bay (asst.)
- 2008–2015: Detroit
- 2015–2019: Arkansas State (asst.)
- 2019–2020: Youngstown State (asst.)
- 2020–2021: Omaha (asst.)

Head coaching record
- Overall: 89–102 (.466)
- Tournaments: 0–1 (WNIT); 4–0 (WBI)

Accomplishments and honors

Awards
- Horizon Coach of the Year (2010); 2× First-team All-Horizon (1996, 1997); Horizon All-Freshman Team (1994)

Autumn Rademacher (born September 7, 1975) is an American college basketball coach who was most recently a women's basketball assistant coach at Omaha. Previously, Rademacher was head coach at the University of Detroit Mercy from 2008 to 2015. She came to the Titans after serving as an assistant coach at Green Bay for four seasons and Western Michigan for seven seasons. In her second season, she led the Titans to a second-place finish in the Horizon League, its best finish since the 1998–99 season. In her fourth year she led the Titans to the Women's Basketball Invitational (WBI) Championship with a win over the McNeese State Cowgirls, 73–62. She was hired as an assistant coach for the Arkansas State Red Wolves on June 8, 2015.

== Player history and education ==
Born in Traverse City, Michigan, Rademacher played NCAA Division I women's basketball on the collegiate level at Detroit. She earned conference first team honors in 1996 and 1997, after earning a position on the second-team and All-Newcomer team as a freshman in 1994. She currently ranks in the top-10 in multiple statistical categories after four seasons as a starter at UDM, including third in career assists (439) and second in career 3-point field goals (201). Rademacher helped lead the Titans to a Horizon League tournament championship and a berth in the 1997 NCAA tournament as a senior season. Rademacher graduated from UDM in 1997 with a degree in criminal justice.

=== Detroit statistics ===
Legend
GP	Games played	GS	Games started	MPG	Minutes per game	RPG	Rebounds per game
APG	Assists per game	SPG	Steals per game	BPG	Blocks per game	PPG	Points per game
TO	Turnovers per game	FG%	Field-goal percentage	3P%	3-point field-goal percentage	FT%	Free-throw percentage
**Bold**	Career best	°	League leader

Year	Team	GP	Points	PPG	FG%	FT%
1993–94	Detroit	28	425	15.2	38.8%	65.6%
1994–95	Detroit	**32**	404	12.6	36.5%	62.3%
1995–96	Detroit	27	**455**	**16.9**	**45.2%**	**82.8%**
1996–97	Detroit	30	402	13.4	42.1%	70.1%
Career		117	1686	14.4	40.4%	71.3%

== Head coaching record ==
Record table
Season	Team	Overall	Conference	Standing	Postseason
Detroit Titans (Horizon League) (2008–2014)
2008–09	Detroit	12–19	7–11	T–7th	
2009–10	Detroit	17–14	14–4	T–2nd	
2010–11	Detroit	13–18	6–12	7th	
2011–12	Detroit	20–14	14–4	2nd	WNIT First Round
2012–13	Detroit	21–13	9–7	4th	WBI Champion
2013–14	Detroit	6–24	3–13	T–8th	
Detroit:		89–102 (.466)	53–51 (.510)		
Total:		89–102 (.466)			
National champion Postseason invitational champion Conference regular season champion Conference regular season and conference tournament champion Division regular season champion Division regular season and conference tournament champion Conference tournament champion
