= Thomas G. Power =

American politician

The Honorable Thomas G. Power

Judge of the 13th Circuit Court of Michigan
- Incumbent
- Assumed office January 1, 1993 Serving with Philip E. Rodgers, Jr.

Member of the Michigan House of Representatives from the 104th district
- In office January 1, 1983 – December 31, 1992
- Preceded by: Connie Binsfeld
- Succeeded by: Michelle McManus

Personal details
- Born: October 21, 1950 (age 75) Traverse City, Michigan
- Education: University of Michigan Law School (J.D.); New York University School of Law; Carleton College

Thomas G. Power (born October 21, 1950) is a judge and a former member of the Michigan House of Representatives.

A graduate of Carleton College with a degree in economics, Power attended the University of Michigan Law School before earning a master's degree from the New York University School of Law. He then was an attorney in private practice and served on the Traverse City school board before his election to the House in 1982.

Power served in the House for 10 years before being elected to the circuit court bench in 1992. He has been re-elected three times since then. Power has also served on the Grand Traverse-Leelanau Community Mental Health Board, and is a pilot for the U.S. Coast Guard Air Auxiliary.
