= Eric Daigh =

American artist (born 1977)

- Born: April 11, 1977 (age 49); Orange, California, U.S.
- Education: University of Montana
- Known for: Modern art, Installation art, New media art, Conceptual art
- Movement: Modernism
- Children: Harper Daigh
- Awards: ArtPrize

Eric Daigh is an American artist based in Traverse City, Michigan. He gained acclaim in 2009 when he won third place for his pushpin portraits in the Inaugural ArtPrize competition in Grand Rapids, Michigan. His artwork displays a strong sense of play and uses a variety of unorthodox and unconventional everyday life materials including pushpins and Post-It notes.

== Artwork ==
Eric Daigh’s artwork combines creativity along with hours of diligent application. As a process artist, his work starts with taking a series of photographs of his subject. After carefully analyzing the photos, he uses a computer and specialized software to break an image down to a very low resolution and forces the computer to make the image out of only five colors (red, blue, yellow, black and white). He then uses a grid map to show where to stick the pins row by row. At first glance, Daigh’s artwork appears to be a low-resolution portrait, but upon closer inspection, onlookers can see each piece is made up of thousands of colored pins. Many of his art pieces use over 11,000 pushpins to complete a three-foot by four-foot piece and as many as 25,000 pushpins for a four-foot by six-foot piece. In Summer 2010, Daigh surpassed his own world record by creating a commissioned pushpin piece for automaker Acura, which used 109,687 pushpins.

== Background ==
Eric Daigh was born in Orange, California and is a graduate of the University of Montana in Missoula, Montana. He is known for his large-scale creative use of pushpins in portraits and multimedia artwork. His artwork combines the use of photography, graphic design and imagination to create a photographic mosaic art piece. His inspiration comes from artist Chuck Close, an American painter and photographer known for his photorealistic massive-scale portraits. Portrait photographer Martin Schoeller also inspired Daigh.

== Honors ==
- 2009 third place winner of ArtPrize. Daigh’s work was exhibited at the Old Federal Building in Grand Rapids, Michigan. The 2009 Inaugural ArtPrize competition drew more than 1,200 artists who exhibited their work throughout Grand Rapids, Michigan. The public used modern networking technology to vote on an artist’s work.
- 2009 Communication Arts (magazine) Illustration Annual Winner.

== Exhibits and Records ==
- 2010 Art Chicago – Carl Hammer Gallery – Chicago
- 2009 Guinness World Records – "Largest Pushpin Mosaic"
- 2009 Ripley's Believe It or Not! – Permanent Museum Collection
- 2008 Right Brain Brewery – Traverse City, Michigan
- 2007 Inside Out Gallery – Traverse City, Michigan
