= Alden G. Glauch =

United States Air Force general

Alden Glenwood Glauch
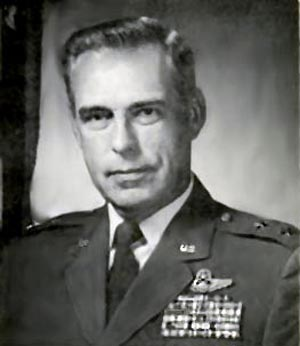
- Born: November 14, 1919; Traverse City, Michigan, United States
- Died: April 16, 2015 (aged 95); The Villages, Florida, United States
- Military career
- Allegiance: United States of America
- Branch: United States Air Force
- Service years: 1942–1981
- Rank: Major General
- Awards: Order of the Sword, Distinguished Service Medal, the Legion of Merit with oak leaf cluster, Distinguished Flying Cross, Meritorious Service Medal, Air Medal with three oak leaf clusters, Air Force Commendation Medal with two oak leaf clusters, Army Commendation Medal, Distinguished Unit Citation Emblem with oak leaf cluster, the Armed Forces Honor Medal, First Class Order, from the Republic of Vietnam

Alden Glenwood Glauch (November 14, 1919 – April 16, 2015) was a major general in the United States Air Force who served as commander, Twenty-First Air Force (Military Airlift Command) at McGuire Air Force Base, New Jersey.

== Biography ==
Glauch was born in 1919, in Traverse City, Michigan, where he graduated from Traverse City High School in 1937. He attended Texas Western College in El Paso, and the University of Maryland, where he majored in aeronautical engineering. During World War II he entered active military service in December 1942 and graduated from aviation cadet pilot training with a commission as second lieutenant and his pilot wings in November 1943. Glauch then served as a fighter pilot in North Africa and subsequently with the 64th Troop Carrier Group in Italy, France and the China-Burma-India Theater of Operations. He was released from active duty in July 1945 and was a member of the Inactive Reserve.

Glauch returned to active duty in February 1949 and was assigned to the 53d Troop Carrier Squadron at Rhein-Main Air Base, Germany, in March 1949, as a pilot and participated in the Berlin airlift. In September 1949 he was assigned as commander of the 2d Air Postal Squadron, U.S. Air Forces in Europe. In May 1952 he went to Westover Air Force Base, Massachusetts, as aerial port control officer and later was assigned to the 20th Air Transport Squadron (Military Air Transport Service), as assistant operations officer. He moved with the 29th Air Transport Squadron to McGuire Air Force Base, New Jersey, in April 1955 and became squadron commander. In July 1956 he was appointed deputy commander, 1611th Air Transport Group, also at McGuire Air Force Base. Glauch attended the Air Command and Staff College, Maxwell Air Force Base, Alabama, from September 1958 to July 1959. He next went to Thule Air Base, Greenland, as commander, 55th Air Rescue Squadron.

From March 1960 to August 1965, Glauch was assigned to Headquarters U.S. Air Force, Washington, D.C., in the Office of the Deputy Chief of Staff, Operations, as chief, MATS and Services Branch, and later in the Office of the Deputy Chief of Staff for Research and Development as chief, Airlift and Services Branch. He again joined Military Airlift Command in August 1965 as director of current operations, Twenty-second Air Force, Travis Air Force Base, California. From March 1968 to March 1969 he served as director of operations for the 834th Air Division in the Republic of Vietnam. He returned to McGuire Air Force Base, New Jersey, in April 1969 as assistant deputy chief of staff, operations, and later was deputy chief of staff, operations, Twenty-first Air Force. He again went to Rhein-Main Air Base, Germany, as commander, 435th Military Airlift Support Wing in April 1970. In April 1971 Glauch became assistant deputy chief of staff, operations, Military Airlift Command, Scott Air Force Base, Illinois, and in July 1972 was named deputy chief of staff, operations. He became commander of Twenty-first Air Force, with headquarters at McGuire Air Force Base, New Jersey, in May 1975.

His military decorations and awards include the Distinguished Service Medal, the Legion of Merit with oak leaf cluster, Distinguished Flying Cross, Meritorious Service Medal, Air Medal with three oak leaf clusters, Air Force Commendation Medal with two oak leaf clusters, Army Commendation Medal, Distinguished Unit Citation Emblem with oak leaf cluster, and the Armed Forces Honor Medal, First Class Order, from the Republic of Vietnam. He was a command pilot with more than 8,000 flying hours. In 1977 he received the Order of the Sword. He was promoted to the grade of major general effective June 20, 1973, with date of rank July 1, 1970. He retired on February 1, 1981, and died on April 16, 2015.
