= Scott Schwenter =

American linguist

Scott Alan Schwenter
- Born: 22 July 1968 Traverse City, Michigan, United States

Scott A. Schwenter is a professor of Hispanic linguistics at Ohio State University where he has taught since 1999. He is a variationist morphosyntactician and pragmaticist, whose research addresses grammatical issues in both Spanish and Portuguese. His work has included both experimental and corpus-based approaches, making use of multivariate statistical analysis to examine broad-scale patterns across different varieties of Spanish and Portuguese.

Schwenter's research interests center around the contextual conditioning of linguistic variables and speakers' choice between variants to express meanings. He has presented and published extensively on (double) negation, imperatives, pronominal objects, second-person plural address forms, and the effects of persistence on convalescing forms.

Schwenter attended Traverse City Senior High, graduating in 1986. He then went on to earn his BA in Spanish and sociology (summa cum laude) from Saginaw Valley State University in 1990. Three years later, Schwenter earned his MA in linguistics from the University of New Mexico. In 1995, he received a fellowship to attend the Linguistic Society of America Summer Institute at the University of New Mexico. In 1998, he graduated with a PhD in linguistics from Stanford University, where he was a student of Penelope Eckert, Eve Clark, and Elizabeth Traugott.

Schwenter worked from 1998 to 1999 as an assistant professor of linguistics in the Department of English at Ball State University in Muncie, Indiana. In 2001, he served as a visiting instructor for the Linguistic Society of America Summer Institute at the University of California, Santa Barbara.

== Presentations and publications ==
Schwenter has published three books, including his doctoral dissertation Pragmatics of conditional marking: Implicature, scalarity, and exclusivity (1999). He has also published scholarly articles in Linguistics, Language Variation and Change, Lingua, Journal of Pragmatics, Journal of Historical Pragmatics, Hispania, Hispanic Linguistics, etc. He has presented at academic conferences such as Berkeley Linguistics Society, Chicago Linguistic Society, New Ways of Analyzing Variation, Hispanic Linguistics Symposium, Sociolinguistics Symposium, Workshop on Spanish Sociolinguistics, etc.

Schwenter also currently serves as associate editor of the journal Studies in Hispanic and Lusophone Linguistics.
