= Michigan High School Athletic Association =

High school athletics organization in Michigan

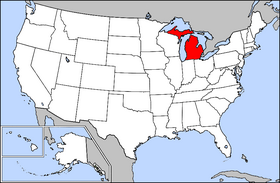
- Abbreviation: MHSAA
- Legal status: Association
- Purpose: Athletic/Educational
- Headquarters: 1661 Ramblewood Dr. East Lansing, Michigan 48823
- Region served: Michigan
- Members: 1,500+ junior and senior high schools
- Executive Director: Mark Uyl
- Affiliations: National Federation of State High School Associations
- Staff: 25
- Website: mhsaa.com
- Remarks: (517) 332-5046

The Michigan High School Athletic Association (MHSAA) is a service organization for high school sports in the U.S. state of Michigan and is headquartered in East Lansing. It is a member of the National Federation of State High School Associations (NFHS).

Unlike many other NFHS member organizations,

- The MHSAA does not charge membership fees for schools; it derives its income from ticket sales at tournament level games and a handful of corporate sponsorships.
- It is independent of and not officially recognized by any governmental body, local or statewide.
- Membership is voluntary; no Michigan high school is compelled by law to be an MHSAA member.

As of January 1, 2026, the MHSAA has 754 member high schools, comprising virtually all high school athletics in Michigan, public and private. Only a small number of private schools and a few nontraditional public schools in Michigan forgo MHSAA membership. MHSAA member schools may compete against non-member school in interscholastic athletic competition.

The MHSAA supports 31 sports.

Boys: Baseball, Basketball, Bowling, Cross Country, Football, Golf, Ice Hockey, Lacrosse, Alpine Skiing, Soccer, Swimming & Diving, Tennis, Track & Field, Volleyball, Wrestling

Girls: Basketball, Bowling, Competitive Cheer, Cross Country, Field Hockey, Golf, Gymnastics, Lacrosse, Alpine Skiing, Soccer, Softball, Swimming & Diving, Tennis, Track & Field, Volleyball, Wrestling

Technically, all "boys" teams are officially "boys & girls" teams, while "girls" teams are "girls only," although having girls actually play on "boys & girls" teams is approximately as uncommon as in the many other states using a similar arrangement. (An example is Norway, Michigan's tennis team).

Traditional classifications used are labeled A, B, C, and D, from largest to smallest. Each grouping consists of 25% (or as close as is mathematically practicable) of all member schools sorted by student population, including a variety of correction factors. Total 4-year coed enrollment cutoffs for the 2025–26 school year are as follows:

- Class A: 788 and above
- Class B: 370-787
- Class C: 171-369
- Class D: 170 and below

The traditional classifications have the same number of schools (or as close as mathematically possible) in each of them, but not necessarily the same number of teams in a given sport's tournament; smaller schools are unable to support as many sport teams, although they may form cooperative programs classified by the combined enrollments of the schools involved. In order to prevent distorted tournament structures, for all sports the MHSAA uses "nearly equal divisions," where only those schools sponsoring a team in the given sport are broken into as many equally sized groupings (or as close to equal as is mathematically possible) as the Association feels is appropriate given the number of schools sponsoring the sport. The MHSAA's tournament structures are similar to those used in many other States; schools are assigned to Regions and, in those sports where it is appropriate, Districts. Assignments are made on a sport-to-sport and year-to-year basis, meaning that as no two sports have identical classification methods and sponsorship levels, a given school will usually have at least minor variations in its overall tournament path from sport to sport.

Unlike in some states, regional and district placement has no bearing on regular season scheduling; schools form conferences on their own or compete as independents, although conferences generally consist of similarly sized schools which are geographically proximate to each other. Except in football, all schools in good standing fielding teams in a particular sport are allowed to enter that sport's postseason tournament which crowns a champion. Some sport championship tournaments are divided into separate Upper Peninsula and Lower Peninsula tournaments; an example of this is tennis. Schools pay no entry fees to participate in MHSAA tournaments, which are paid for out of ticket sales, sponsorships and broadcast rights fees.

For football, postseason inclusion was, through 2019, determined by wins and a computer point value, calculated for each team based upon its record and strength of schedule, with the top 256 teams (including all teams with six victories if playing a nine-game schedule) qualifying. These 256 teams were then ordered by enrollment and divided into 8 divisions of 32 teams each. This was nearly unique amongst high school football competition in the U.S. in that many teams do not know which classification they will compete for a state title in until after the regular season has ended; the Illinois High School Association, North Carolina High School Athletic Association, and Wisconsin Interscholastic Athletic Association also have a similar format. The MHSAA announced in 2019 that, beginning with the 2020 season, its football playoff system would change: The aforementioned computer point value (derived from a combination of a team's own record, its opponents' record and its opponents' opponents' record, with points awarded based on which of the four classes each opponent is in) will be the sole method to select playoff teams, and the eight divisions will be set in advance of the season.

Participation in Michigan is generally limited to eligible 9th through 12th graders; students are given eight consecutive semesters of eligibility beginning with the 9th grade. Schools with a four-year high school enrollment of 99 or less may draw upon the 8th grade for varsity competition in all sports except football, ice hockey and wrestling, while schools with a four-year high school enrollment of 49 or less may also draw upon the 7th grade.

== Participation ==
Michigan maintained its standing nationally in high school sports participation statistics for the 2018–19 school year, according to the National Federation of State High School Associations. The total for the 2018–19 year was 281,992, with 120,378 girls and 161,614 boys taking part.

== Student leadership ==
=== MHSAA Scholar-Athlete Award ===
Each year, the MHSAA recognizes 32 student-athletes throughout the state of Michigan with its Scholar-Athlete Award. Recipients receive a $1,000 scholarship. The award is sponsored by Farm Bureau Insurance.

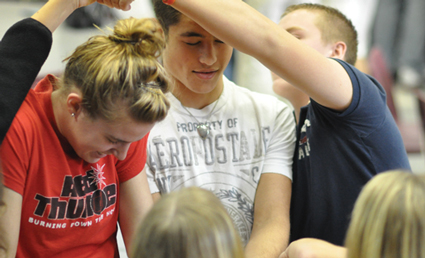
Students work to untie a "human knot" at a Captains Clinic

=== MHSAA Captains Clinic Series ===
In conjunction with Michigan State University's Institute for the Study of Youth Sports, the MHSAA provides programming to member schools via their leagues and/or conferences in the form of one-day trainings. Curriculum is geared toward developing leadership skills for current and future team captains.

=== Student Advisory Council ===
In 2005, the MHSAA created a 16-member student panel to act as the voice of Michigan's student athlete population, serve as a sounding board for the MHSAA's Representative Council, assist in planning Sportsmanship Summits and Captains Clinics, and to help with medal and trophy ceremonies at MHSAA championship events. The council is composed of eight boys and eight girls, all of either junior or senior high school status.

== MHSAA tournaments ==
=== Boys ===
| Sport | Season | Division/ Class | Venue (as of fall 2016) | City |
|---|---|---|---|---|
| Cross Country | Fall | LP 1/2/3/4 | Michigan International Speedway | Brooklyn |
| Cross Country | Fall | UP 1/2/3 | Gladstone High School | Gladstone |
| Football | Fall | 1/2/3/4/5/6/7/8 | Ford Field | Detroit |
| 8 Player Football | Fall | 1 and 2 | Superior Dome | Marquette |
| Soccer | Fall | 1/4 | Comstock Park High School | Comstock Park |
| Soccer | Fall | 2/3 | Stoney Creek High School | Rochester Hills |
| Tennis | Fall | LP 1 | Midland Tennis Center | Midland |
| Tennis | Fall | LP 2 | Hope College | Holland |
| Tennis | Fall | LP 3 | Kalamazoo College | Kalamazoo |
| Tennis | Fall | LP 4 | Holly HS / Fenton HS | Holly / Fenton |
| Basketball | Winter | 1/2/3/4 | Breslin Center | East Lansing |
| Bowling | Winter | 1/4 | Sterling Lanes | Sterling Heights |
| Bowling | Winter | 2 | Super Bowl | Canton |
| Bowling | Winter | 3 | Airport Lanes | Jackson |
| Bowling | Winter | 4 | Royal Scot | Lansing |
| Ice Hockey | Winter | 1/2/3 | USA Hockey Arena | Plymouth |
| Skiing | Winter | 1 | Nub's Nob | Harbor Springs |
| Skiing | Winter | 2 | Boyne Highlands | Harbor Springs |
| Swimming & Diving | Winter | LP 1 | Holland Aquatic Center | Holland |
| Swimming & Diving | Winter | LP 2 | Saginaw Valley State University | University Center |
| Swimming & Diving | Winter | LP 3 | Eastern Michigan University | Ypsilanti |
| Swimming & Diving | Winter | UP | Marquette High School | Marquette |
| Wrestling (team) | Winter | 1/2/3/4 | Wings Event Center | Kalamazoo |
| Wrestling (individual) | Winter | 1/2/3/4 | Ford Field | Detroit |
| Baseball | Spring | 1/2/3/4 | Michigan State University | East Lansing |
| Golf | Spring | LP 1 | Grand Valley State University | Allendale |
| Golf | Spring | LP 2 | Bedford Valley | Battle Creek |
| Golf | Spring | LP 3 | Forest Akers East | East Lansing |
| Golf | Spring | LP 4 | Forest Akers West | East Lansing |
| Golf | Spring | UP 1 | Wawonowin | Negaunee |
| Golf | Spring | UP 2 | Oak Crest | Norway |
| Golf | Spring | UP 3 | Escanaba Country Club | Escanaba |
| Lacrosse | Spring | 1/2 | Parker Middle School | Howell |
| Tennis | Spring | UP 1 | Negaunee High School | Negaunee |
| Tennis | Spring | UP 2 | Iron Mountain High School | Iron Mountain |
| Track & Field | Spring | LP 1 | East Kentwood High School | Kentwood |
| Track & Field | Spring | LP 2 | Forest Hills Eastern High School | Ada |
| Track & Field | Spring | LP 3 | Comstock Park High School | Comstock |
| Track & Field | Spring | LP 4 | Hudsonville High School | Hudsonville |
| Track & Field | Spring | UP 1/2/3 | Kingsford High School | Kingsford |

=== Girls ===
| Sport | Season | Division/ Class | Venue (as of fall 2017) | City |
|---|---|---|---|---|
| Cross Country | Fall | LP 1/2/3/4 | Michigan International Speedway | Brooklyn |
| Cross Country | Fall | UP 1/2/3 | Munising High School | Munising |
| Golf | Fall | LP 1 | The Meadows, Grand Valley State University | Allendale |
| Golf | Fall | LP 2 | Bedford Valley | Battle Creek |
| Golf | Fall | LP 3 | Forest Akers West, Michigan State University | East Lansing |
| Golf | Fall | LP 4 | Forest Akers East, Michigan State University | East Lansing |
| Swimming & Diving | Fall | LP 1 | Eastern Michigan University | Ypsilanti |
| Swimming & Diving | Fall | LP 2 | Oakland University | Rochester Hills |
| Swimming & Diving | Fall | LP 3 | Holland Aquatic Center | Holland |
| Tennis | Fall | UP 1 | Kingsford High School | Kingsford |
| Tennis | Fall | UP 2 | Ishpeming Westwood High School | Ishpeming |
| Volleyball | Fall | 1/2/3/4 | Kellogg Arena | Battle Creek |
| Basketball | Winter | 1/2/3/4 | Calvin College | Grand Rapids |
| Bowling | Winter | 1 | Sterling Lanes | Sterling Heights |
| Bowling | Winter | 2 | Super Bowl | Canton |
| Bowling | Winter | 3 | Airport Lanes | Jackson |
| Bowling | Winter | 4 | Royal Scot | Lansing |
| Competitive Cheer | Winter | 1/2/3/4 | Delta Plex | Grand Rapids |
| Gymnastics | Winter | 1/2 | Rockford High School | Rockford |
| Skiing | Winter | 1 | Marquette Mountain | Marquette |
| Skiing | Winter | 2 | Schuss Mountain | Bellaire |
| Swimming & Diving | Winter | UP | Marquette High School | Marquette |
| Golf | Spring | UP 1 | Marquette Golf & Country Club | Marquette |
| Golf | Spring | UP 1 | Wawonowin | Negaunee |
| Golf | Spring | UP 2 | Oak Crest | Norway |
| Golf | Spring | UP 3 | Mid-Peninsula | Rock |
| Lacrosse | Spring | 1/2 | Brighton High School | Brighton |
| Soccer | Spring | 1/2 | Michigan State University | East Lansing |
| Soccer | Spring | 3/4 | Mason High School | Mason |
| Softball | Spring | 1/2/3/4 | Michigan State University | East Lansing |
| Tennis | Spring | LP 1 | Midland Tennis Center | Midland |
| Tennis | Spring | LP 2 | Holly | Holly |
| Tennis | Spring | LP 3 | Holland High School | Holland |
| Tennis | Spring | LP 4 | Kalamazoo College | Kalamazoo |
| Track & Field | Spring | LP 1 | East Kentwood High School | Kentwood |
| Track & Field | Spring | LP 2 | Forest Hills Eastern High School | Ada |
| Track & Field | Spring | LP 3 | Comstock Park High School | Comstock |
| Track & Field | Spring | LP 4 | Hudsonville High School | Hudsonville |
| Track & Field | Spring | UP 1/2/3 | Kingsford High School | Kingsford |

- MHSAA Student Advisory Council
