= Midland Community Stadium =

Sports venue in Midland, Michigan

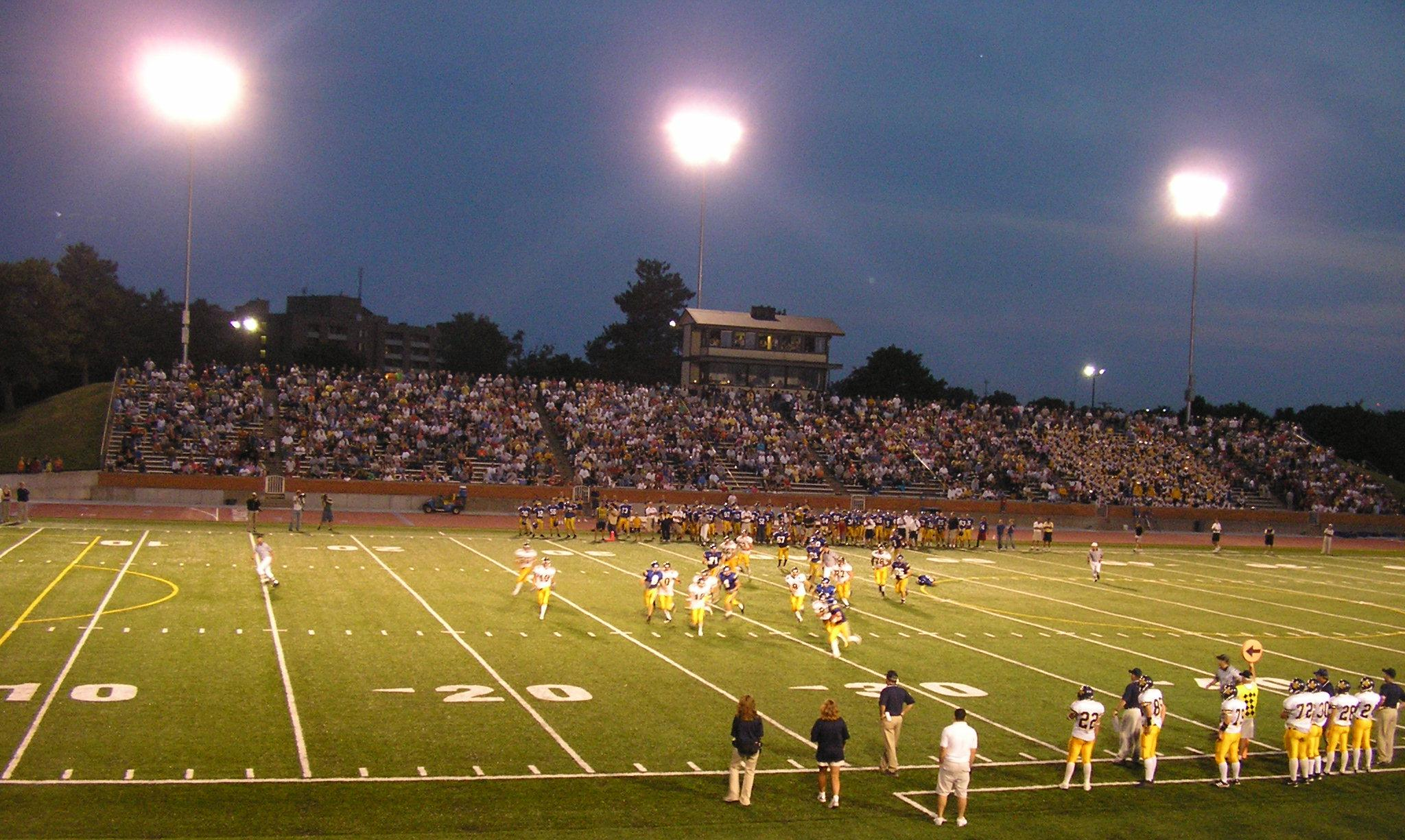
- Chemics vs Oilers, 8/27/05
- Interactive map of Midland Community Stadium
- Location: Midland, Michigan
- Coordinates: 43.6211°N 84.2157°W
- Owner: Midland Public Schools
- Operator: Midland Public Schools
- Capacity: 7,500 + 1,000
- Surface: AstroTurf XPe

Construction
- Groundbreaking: May, 1958
- Built: 1958
- Opened: September 26, 1958
- Renovated: 1987 $790,000
- Expanded: 2021 $1 million
- Cost: $125,000
- Architect: Alden B. Dow, Inc. A.I.A.
- General contractor: Alden Dow Building Co.

Midland Community Stadium (MCS) is located in Midland, Michigan and is owned by Midland Public Schools. The stadium is notable because the fan seating is built into human-made earthen hills, and does not have scaffolding type bleachers that are typical for high school stadiums. There is aluminum bench seating for approximately 7,500 (4,000 on the home side; 3,500 on the visitor side), but for the yearly football grudge match between the two cross-town rivals, it is not uncommon for over 10,000 fans to attend. In a 2014 vote of best Michigan high school stadiums by sports reporters, the 55-year-old facility ranked #19.

== History ==
The stadium was built adjacent to Midland High School during the summer of 1958. It was designed by Alden B. Dow Inc. An article in the Midland Daily News reported that the stadium had "the finest in lights, sod, permanent bleachers and press facilities. The one-side stadium is 100 yards long and 22 rows high. The concrete stands, with 4,092 permanent wooden seats, are built on an earthen bank that slopes away from the back of the stadium. A 25-foot landing atop the stadium will accommodate additional portable bleachers. With the erection of temporary seats on the opposite side of the field and in the two end zones, upwards of 10,000 fans can be accommodated." It was dedicated as "Midland Stadium" on October 17 of that year during a win over the Alpena Wildcats. The stadium, high school and Parkdale Elementary were built on the old Midland Airfield, replaced by Barstow Airport. After the city's second high school, Herbert Henry Dow High School opened in 1968, the name was changed to Midland Community Stadium because the facility was used by both schools as their home field for football, soccer, lacrosse and track meets.

The stadium was briefly home to the Tri-City Apollos of the Continental Football League for one season in 1969. The team was so bad that they were known locally as the Tri-City Apollo-gies. The league folded that same year.

Nearby Northwood University has played at MCS, when schedules permit and ticket demand greatly exceeds the 3,000-seat capacity of their Hantz Stadium.

== Improvements ==
Visitor's bleachers with Midland High School in background

The original construction in 1958 did not include permanent seating on the visitor's side opposite the press box. Wood scaffolding bleachers were used. A stadium upgrade in 1987 included construction of a visiting team locker room, permanent seating on the visitor side and replacing the cinder track with an all-weather, synthetic surface rededicated October 30, 1987.

The field was upgraded in 2004 with installation of an artificial surface, AstroTurf XPe, the same product used at many professional and college sports facilities. Very few high school fields use artificial turf due to the high cost. Additional improvements that same year included paving & surfacing, fencing, a new synthetic track surface and audio & video cable installation to simplify setup for broadcast and/or taping of stadium events.

In 2021, a $1 million project was completed which introduced all aluminum stadium seating, additional handrails, and wheelchair-accessible seating with partner benches.

== Fire ==
A lightning strike caused a fire in the wood-frame stadium press box in late August 2018, destroying the sound system, scoreboard controller and most of the interior. An $80,000 grant from Chemical Bank covered the replacement of the controller and sound system. The school board covered installation costs between $7,000 and $9,000.

At the October 2018 board meeting, Midland Superintendent Michael Sharrow told the board that the damaged press box had been removed from the stadium. He stated that the lower structure was built with the stadium in 1958 and the top level was added in the 1970s for coaching staff. Neither was "high-quality". Replacement could cost $600,000 and they were still in discussions with their insurance carrier about compensation.

Midland Daily News reporter Fred Kelly interviewed sports writers, broadcast and PA announcers, statisticians and coaches for their memories from their time in the press box. Most recalled outstanding athletes who subsequently played at college and then professionally including Randy Kinder, Jalen Parmele, Stuart Schweigert, Charles Rogers, LaMarr Woodley and Matt Trannon. Others spoke of the excitement of Midland versus Dow games with huge fan turnout and higher energy than playoff games.

A single-story elevated brick press box was completed in time for the first game of the 2019 season on September 6th.
