= Barry Stokes (American football) =

American football player (born 1973)

No. 66, 67, 79, 68
- Position: Offensive tackle

Personal information
- Born: December 20, 1973 (age 52); Flint, Michigan, U.S.
- Listed height: 6 ft 4 in (1.93 m)
- Listed weight: 310 lb (141 kg)

Career information
- High school: Davison (MI)
- College: Eastern Michigan
- NFL draft: 1996: undrafted

Career history
- Detroit Lions (1996)*; Jacksonville Jaguars (1996)*; Atlanta Falcons (1997)*; Rhein Fire (1997); St. Louis Rams (1997)*; Miami Dolphins (1997)*; Scottish Claymores (1998); Miami Dolphins (1998); Scottish Claymores (1999); Green Bay Packers (1999); Oakland Raiders (1999); Green Bay Packers (2000–2001); Cleveland Browns (2002–2003); New York Giants (2004); Atlanta Falcons (2005); Detroit Lions (2006–2007); New England Patriots (2008)
- * Offseason or practice squad member only

Awards and highlights
- All-MAC (1995)

Career NFL statistics
- Games played: 83
- Games started: 44
- Fumble recoveries: 1
- Stats at Pro Football Reference

Barry Wade Stokes (born December 20, 1973) is an American former professional football player who was an offensive tackle in the National Football League (NFL). He was signed by the Detroit Lions as an undrafted free agent in 1996. He played college football for the Eastern Michigan Eagles. He played high school football at Davison High School in Davison, Michigan.

Stokes was also a member of the Jacksonville Jaguars, St. Louis Rams, Miami Dolphins, Green Bay Packers, Oakland Raiders, Cleveland Browns, New York Giants, Atlanta Falcons, and New England Patriots.

== Professional career ==
Prior to playing for the Falcons, he was signed to the practice squad of several teams, but did not see NFL action until the 1998 NFL season with the Miami Dolphins. He then played for the Green Bay Packers and Cleveland Browns, and was a member of the New York Giants but did not play due to back injuries. He spent time in NFL Europe, where he played for the Scottish Claymores.
