= Mount Pleasant Public Schools =

School district

Address
- 720 North Kinney Mount Pleasant, Isabella County, Michigan, 48858; United States

District information
- Type: Public
- Motto: Empower Excellence
- President: Wiline Pangle
- Vice-president: Tim Odykirk
- Superintendent: Jennifer Verleger
- Asst. superintendent(s): Linda Boyd
- Schools: 10
- Budget: $38,435,000 (2011-12)
- District ID: 37010

Students and staff
- Students: 3,459 (2013-14)
- Teachers: 245 (2013-14)
- Staff: 626 (2014-2015)
- Student–teacher ratio: 22:1 (2013-14)
- Athletic conference: Saginaw Valley League

Other information
- Website: https://mtpleasantschools.net/

The Mount Pleasant Public Schools (MPPS) is a public school district in Mount Pleasant, Michigan.

In 2021, the entire district territory joined the service area and the taxation area of Mid Michigan College as per the results of an election. On May 4, voters passed two ballot proposals that sought approval for both annexation and the college's millage rate. Within the Mt. Pleasant School District, 1,593 and 1,415 voters approved being a part of the service area and taxation area, respectively, while 952 and 1,141 voted against each, respectively.

The District includes the following schools:

- Fancher Elementary
- McGuire Elementary
- Ganiard Elementary
- Pullen Elementary
- Vowles Elementary
- Mount Pleasant Middle School
- Mount Pleasant High School
