= Bill Barclay =

American athlete and coach

Biographical details
- Born: Flint, Michigan, U.S.
- Died: September 1, 2001 (aged 85); Topsfield, Massachusetts, U.S.

Playing career
- 1935–1938: Michigan (football, basketball, golf)

Coaching career (HC unless noted)

Basketball
- 1939–1940: Davison HS (MI)
- 1940–1942: Cadillac HS (MI)
- 1942–1946: Michigan (Asst.)
- 1946–1949: Harvard

Football
- 1939: Davison HS (MI)
- 1940–1941: Cadillac HS (MI)
- 1942–1945: Michigan (Asst.)

Golf
- 1945–1946: Michigan

Head coaching record
- Overall: 24–49

William C. Barclay was an American athlete and coach who played football, basketball, and golf at the University of Michigan and was the head coach of the Harvard Crimson men's basketball team.

== Early life ==
Barclay was born and raised in Flint, Michigan. In 1933, he led Flint Northern High School to the Michigan Class A Championship. In 1934, he enrolled in the University of Michigan, where he earned varsity leaders in football (1935–37), basketball (1936–38), and golf (1936–38). On October 30, 1937, he intercepted a pass to set up Michigan's only touchdown in their 7–6 victory over the Illinois Fighting Illini. He won the 1939 Michigan Amateur Golf Championship.

== Coaching ==
In 1939, Barclay began his coaching career at Davison High School. In 1942, he returned to his alma mater as assistant varsity basketball coach and freshman football coach. In 1945, he became head coach of the Wolverines golf team.

On October 21, 1946, Barclay was named head basketball coach at Harvard. Led by Saul Mariaschin, the Crimson compiled a 16-9 record in 1946-47. However, Harvard went 8–40 over the next two seasons and Barclay's contract was not renewed when it expired in July 1949. Barclay scouted for the Harvard Crimson football team after his former Michigan teammate Arthur Valpey became head coach in 1948.

== Golf ==
In 1940, Barclay became the golf pro at the Cadillac County Club in Cadillac, Michigan. While coaching at Michigan, he managed and was the professional for the school's golf course. From 1948 to 1980, Barclay was the golf pro at Salem Country Club in Peabody, Massachusetts. He made it to the final round of the 1959 New England PGA Championship, but lost to Bob Crowley. He was named NEPGA professional of the year in 1978 and 1999 and was elected to the organization's hall of fame in 1999.

== Death ==
Barclay died on September 1, 2001 at his home in Topsfield, Massachusetts. He was 85 years old.
