= Mount Pleasant High School (Michigan) =

High School

Location
- 1155 South Elizabeth Street; Mount Pleasant, Michigan 48858; United States
- Coordinates: 43°35′33″N 84°45′48″W

Information
- Other name: MPHS
- Type: Public high school
- Motto: Explore More
- School district: Mount Pleasant Public Schools
- NCES School ID: 262475006135
- Principal: John Winkler
- Teaching staff: 68.73 (on an FTE basis)
- Grades: 9–12
- Enrollment: 1130 (2023-2024)
- Student to teacher ratio: 16.35
- Colors: Blue and Gold
- Athletics conference: Saginaw Valley League
- Mascot: Ollie the Oiler
- Nickname: Oilers
- Website: www.mtpleasantschools.net/o/mphs

Mount Pleasant High School (MPHS) is a public high school in Mount Pleasant, Michigan, United States. It is part of the Mount Pleasant Public Schools district.

== Alumni ==
- Matt LaFleur, head coach the Green Bay Packers
- Mike LaFleur (2005), head coach the Arizona Cardinals
- Sara Murray (2003), journalist
