= William H. Haithco Recreation Area =

Park in Michigan, United States of America

- Interactive map of William H. Haithco Recreation Area
- Location: 2121 Schust Road, Saginaw Charter Township, Michigan
- Coordinates: 43.47071°N 83.95905°W
- Area: 76-acre (31 ha)
- Operator: Saginaw County Parks and Recreation Commission
- Open: Friday before Memorial Day until Labor Day
- Status: Open

William H. Haithco Recreation Area (also referred to as Haithco Park) is a 76-acre (31 ha) public park in Saginaw Charter Township, Michigan maintained by the Saginaw County Parks and Recreation Commission.

== History ==
It was a "borrow pit" for fill dirt for the I-675 construction and "dumping ground for trash" after the construction was completed. While borrow pits are usually clay in nature, the site's man-made lake was actually spring fed. It became property of Saginaw Township after the I-675 construction was completed. Discussions on acquiring the land for the county began in the summer of 1986 and an arrangement was made in October 1986. Saginaw County Parks and Recreation acquired the 39-acre parcel north of the lake, which had been assessed at US$330,000 (equivalent to $969,262 in 2025) by a group of South Haven, Michigan attorneys and businessmen. The Michigan Department of Natural Resources provided 75% of the purchase cost, and the Saginaw County Government, Wickets Foundation, and William H. Haithco Sr. provided the additional 25%. The property was acquired for development as a park in December 1986.

The Saginaw Valley Rotary Club donated US$8,500 (equivalent to $20,947 in 2025) in June 1990 to pay for the construction of two pavilions.

The park was named for founder of the Saginaw County Parks and Recreation Commission, William H. Haithco Sr. in 1991. The lake was named for Haithco in May 1991. Haithco played an instrumental role in the development of the park.

The pump track opened in August 2011 near the entrance of the park off Schust Road. The track features small hills and cost $15,000 to design and install.

== Features ==
The park includes a 40-acre (16 ha) man-made lake – known as Haithco Lake or Lake Haithco, a lifeguard supervised beach, sand volleyball courts, horseshoe pits, paddleboat rentals, rowboat rentals, canoe rentals, kayak rentals, playground, fishing access, barbecue grill, five pavilions available for rent, concession stand, a pump track, and bathrooms. Dogs are not permitted at the park.

== Events ==
The park hosts a number of events throughout the year, such as fishing competitions, community fundraisers, and Children's Fun Days.

=== Polar Plunge ===
Held annually since 2000, Polar Plunge is a fundraiser organized by the Law Enforcement Torch Run organization. During the event, people jump into Haithco Lake in the winter while the lake has ice, an activity known as polar bear diving. Money raised goes to support the Special Olympics Michigan.
