= Powers Catholic High School =

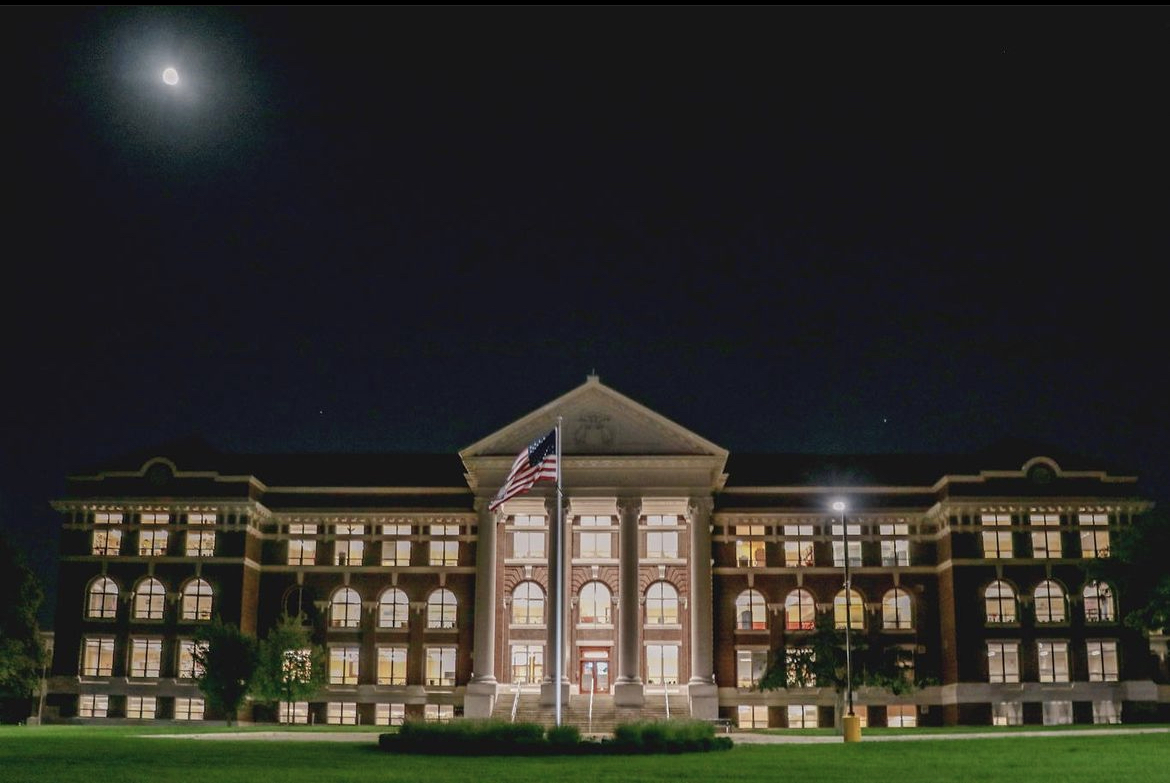

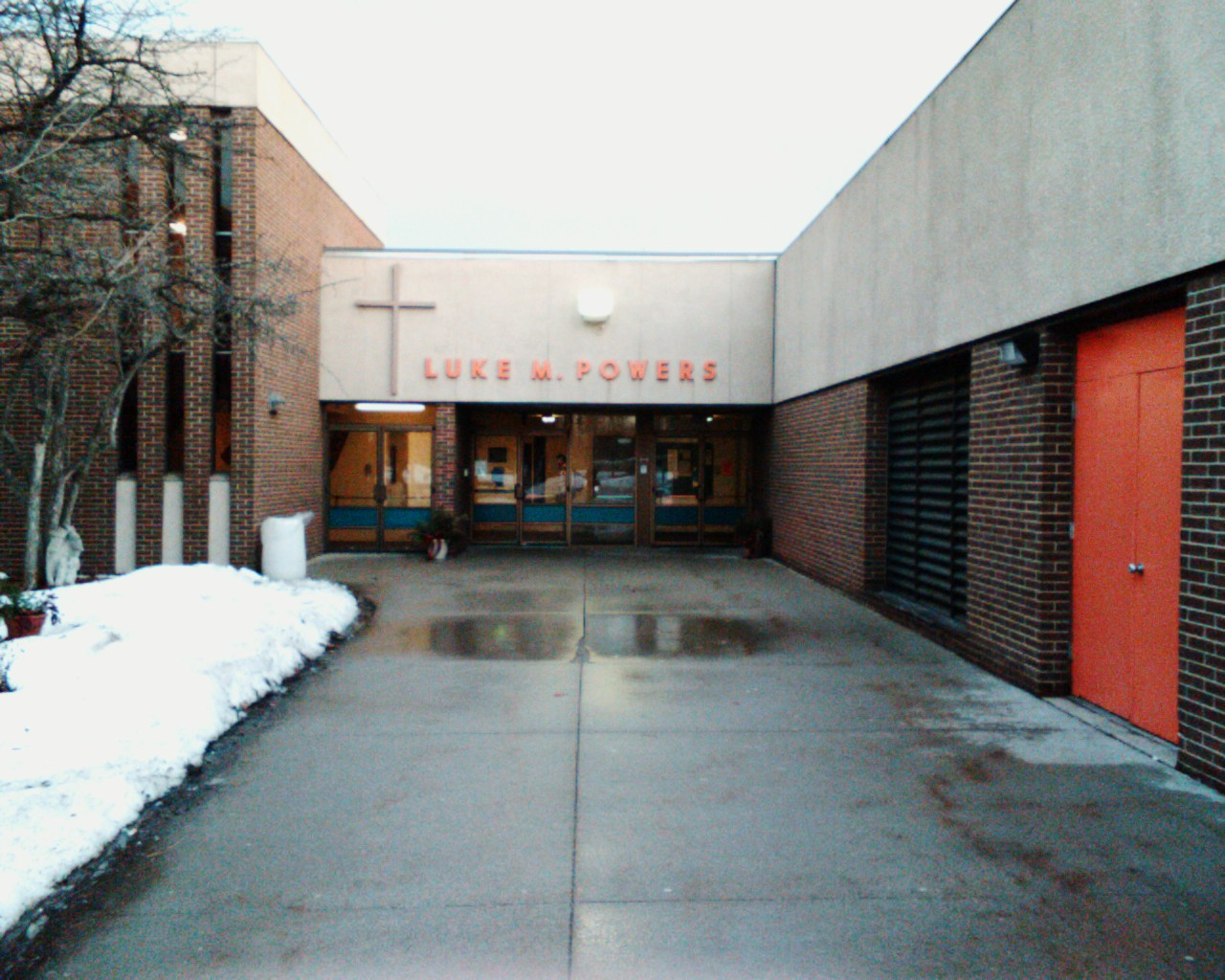
- Former Main entrance

Location
- 1505 West Court Street; Flint, Michigan 48503; United States; 43°0′19″N 83°42′12″W

Information
- Type: Private school
- Religious affiliation: Roman Catholic
- Established: 1970
- Authority: Diocese of Lansing
- Principal: Kelly Jimenez Boike
- Chaplain: Fr. Anthony (Tony) Smela
- Teaching staff: 38.0 (on an FTE basis)
- Grades: 9–12
- Enrollment: 696 (2017-18)
- Student to teacher ratio: 18.3
- Colors: Orange; Blue
- Athletics conference: Saginaw Valley League
- Nickname: Chargers
- Newspaper: The Powerline
- Yearbook: Pegasus
- Tuition: $5300 - $9530 USD
- Website: www.powerscatholic.org

Luke M. Powers Catholic High School is a coeducational private Roman Catholic high school located in Flint, Michigan serving students in grades 9–12 under the Roman Catholic Diocese of Lansing.

== History ==
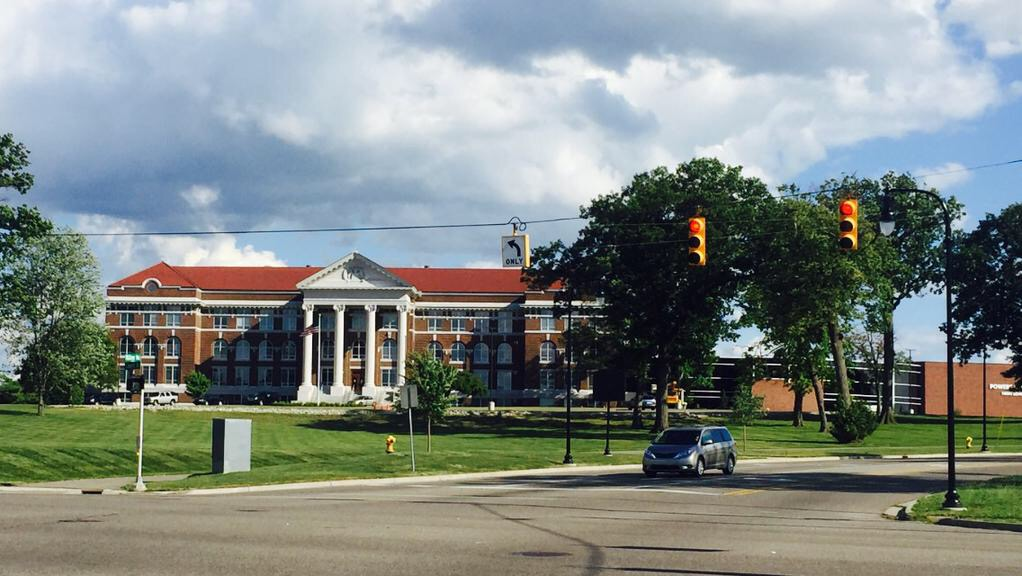
Fay Hall, built in 1913

Powers Catholic was established in 1970 under the Roman Catholic Diocese of Lansing and bears of name of Luke M. Powers, a Villanova University educated pastor in Flint from 1929 to 1966.

After 40 years at its original location just north of Flint in Mount Morris Township, Powers relocated to downtown Flint for the 2013-14 school year, with historic Fay Hall serving as the main academic building. As part of a 36 million dollar development approved in 2010, Fay Hall was restored and a 75,000-square-foot addition containing a gymnasium, chapel, library, theater and media center was added to the campus.

In 2022, Powers Catholic alumni Brian Sheeran was named the school’s new principal following the departure of his predecessor, Deacon Sean Costello. Dcn. Costello served in that role for the duration of the 2021-22 school year before accepting a position as Superintendent of Schools for the Archdiocese of Detroit. Following Sheeran's 2025 departure, Mrs. Kelly Jimenez Boike was named principal.

== Athletics ==
The Powers Catholic Chargers compete in the Saginaw Valley League. In 2015, the soccer, lacrosse and football teams began playing home games at Kettering University’s historic Atwood Stadium, following a $2 million restoration to the 11,000-seat stadium. The following Michigan High School Athletic Association (MHSAA) sanctioned sports are offered:

- Baseball (boys)
  - State champion - 1974, 1980, 2024
- Basketball (girls and boys)
  - Boys state champion - 2009
  - Girls state champion - 1991, 1996, 2000, 2001
- Bowling (girls and boys)
  - Girls State Champions - 2023
- Competitive cheerleading (girls)
- Cross country (girls and boys)
  - Boys state champion - 1999
- Football (boys)
  - State champion - 2005, 2011
- Golf (girls and boys)
  - Boys state champion - 1993, 1995, 1998, 2001, 2006, 2018
  - Girls state champion - 1989, 1993, 1994, 2007, 2008, 2018
- Ice Hockey (boys) - Division 3 State Champions 2023, 2025
- Lacrosse (girls and boys)
  - Girls state champion - 2008
- Skiing (girls and boys)
- Soccer (girls and boys)
  - Boys state champion - 1996, 2013, 2017
  - Girls state champion - 2011, 2017. 2018
- Softball (girls)
- Swim and dive (girls and boys)
- Tennis (girls and boys)
- Track and field (girls and boys)
- Volleyball (girls)
- Wrestling (boys)

== Notable alumni ==
- Javontae Hawkins (born 1993), basketball player in the Israeli Basketball Premier League
- Todd Lyght (born 1969), former NFL cornerback
- Cooper Rush (born 1993), NFL quarterback
