= John Bartos =

Founder of the Three Rivers Construction construction company

John Norbert Bartos
- Born: June 6, 1940 (age 86); Midland, Michigan, U.S.
- Education: Michigan State University (B.E.); Stanford University (M.S.)
- Occupation: Founder of numerous companies
- Known for: construction education and community involvement
- Political party: Republican
- Spouse: Sandra (Née Des Jardin)
- Children: 3

John Bartos (born June 6, 1940) is the founder and former president of Three Rivers Construction, the largest privately held construction company in Mid-Michigan. For forty years he has also been active in construction education and community involvement.

== Early life ==
He was born in June 1940, into a farming family in Midland County, Michigan, the 10th of 15 children. Ownership of the family farm dates back to 1892. His education began in a one-room schoolhouse and his family expected him to continue his father's trade as a carpenter and farmer. When he was young, he was fascinated by building construction, and enjoyed looking at how structures were put together. While in high school, Bartos spoke to the assistant principal about his dream of becoming an engineer. The administrator suggested that John's woodshop skills and membership in Future Farmers of America supported a career in farming, which motivated Bartos to further his education.

== Education ==
He graduated from Midland High School in 1958; attended Bay City Junior College (now Delta College) before earning a Bachelor of Engineering degree from Michigan State University and a Master of Science degree from Stanford University. Bartos worked summers to pay for tuition, initially as a carpenter, then for the Dow Chemical Company in Midland. In an interview, Bartos was quoted, "When I got out of Stanford, I went to (his assistant principal's house) and said, 'I went a different route – here's my master's degree from Stanford.' He looked at me and said, 'You didn't do what I told you to do, did you?'"

== Career ==
=== Three Rivers ===
When Bartos left Stanford, he returned to Midland, working at Collinson Construction Company. He was named president there in 1971 and stayed until 1976 when he founded his own organization, Three Rivers Corporation. He partnered with Sandy, his wife, to grow to the company to over 400 employees in ten years developing a reputation for quality work on time and within budget. They also started Texas Rivers Construction in Freeport, Texas during 1981. Both companies were eventually sold to the employees. Clients included Dow Chemical Company, Central Michigan University in Mount Pleasant. Three Rivers was selected to construct the Dow Diamond in Midland, home of the Great Lakes Loons minor league baseball team, the Class A affiliate of the Los Angeles Dodgers.

=== Other business ===
He also founded Anatek, a Forensic engineering firm in 1981, Point North Development, a Mergers and acquisitions Facilitator in 1982, and Florida Rivers in 1983. He remains active with JS&B Associates, a real estate developer and subdivider; Larkin Pines and Midland Solar Applications, which designs and installs Photovoltaic systems for residential and commercial use.

== Public service ==
=== Construction industry & education ===
In 1977 Bartos was a founding board member of Associated Builders and Contractors Saginaw Valley Chapter. Bartos assisted in establishing the NCCER-accredited Greater Michigan Construction Academy in 1983, which now has locations in Midland, Saginaw and Lansing. He served as chairman of the National Center for Construction Education and Research in 1996. In 2000 he helped create the Michigan Training & Education Center (MiTEC) and was a board member.

=== Community ===
Community involvement includes serving leadership positions at over 25 area and state organizations, including director of the Charles J. Strosacker Foundation, the Brownfield Redevelopment Authority and the Midland Area Community Foundation. He is a past director of Comerica Bank, chaired the Midland celebration for Dow Chemical's 100th Anniversary and was a director for Midland Center for the Arts, Big Brothers Big Sisters of America, United Way and the Dow Community Advisory Panel. Bartos is on the boards of Mid-Michigan Innovation Center, Mid-Michigan Medical Center, Blue Water Angels and Midland Tomorrow. He is a trustee for the Michigan Baseball Foundation. He has served on the City of Midland Local Development Finance Authority since November 2002. His term expires December 1, 2023. Bartos was one of 14 members of the Midland Entryway Initiative Taskforce in 2000. Their goal was to create and place attractive signs at strategic locations around the city to help provide directions for visitors.

=== Awards and honors ===
- In 1993, Michigan Governor John Engler appointed Bartos to serve on the Michigan Occupational Safety and Health Administration governing committee through 1998.
- The Midland Chamber of Commerce honored him with their Excellence in Community Service award, and Development of Business and Education Partnership award.
- He received the Distinguished Citizen Award from the Boy Scouts of America, the Entrepreneurial Leadership Award from the Ted Doan Foundation, and was inducted into the Junior Achievement Hall of Fame in 2003.
- Bartos received the 2004 Midland Tomorrow Award, given for outstanding contributions in Midland County that enhance quality of life, retain jobs and attract new investments.
- He was inducted into the Michigan Construction Hall of Fame in 2014.
- He was inducted into the Associated Builders and Contractors Founders Hall of Fame in 2018.
- John and his wife Sandy were named 2019 Philanthropists of the Year by the Midland Area Community Foundation
- Both received the Margaret Ann Riecker Meritorious Service Award from the Midland County Republican Party. Former Michigan Attorney General Bill Schuette commented, ""Both of them are so giving in terms of philanthropy, charity, education and community involvement."

== Personal ==
While in school, Haskell met Sandy Des Jardin, whom he married in 1964 and with whom he shared three children: Christopher, Pamela and Bruce. However, son Christopher passed in 2003.
