= Davison Township, Michigan =

- Civil township
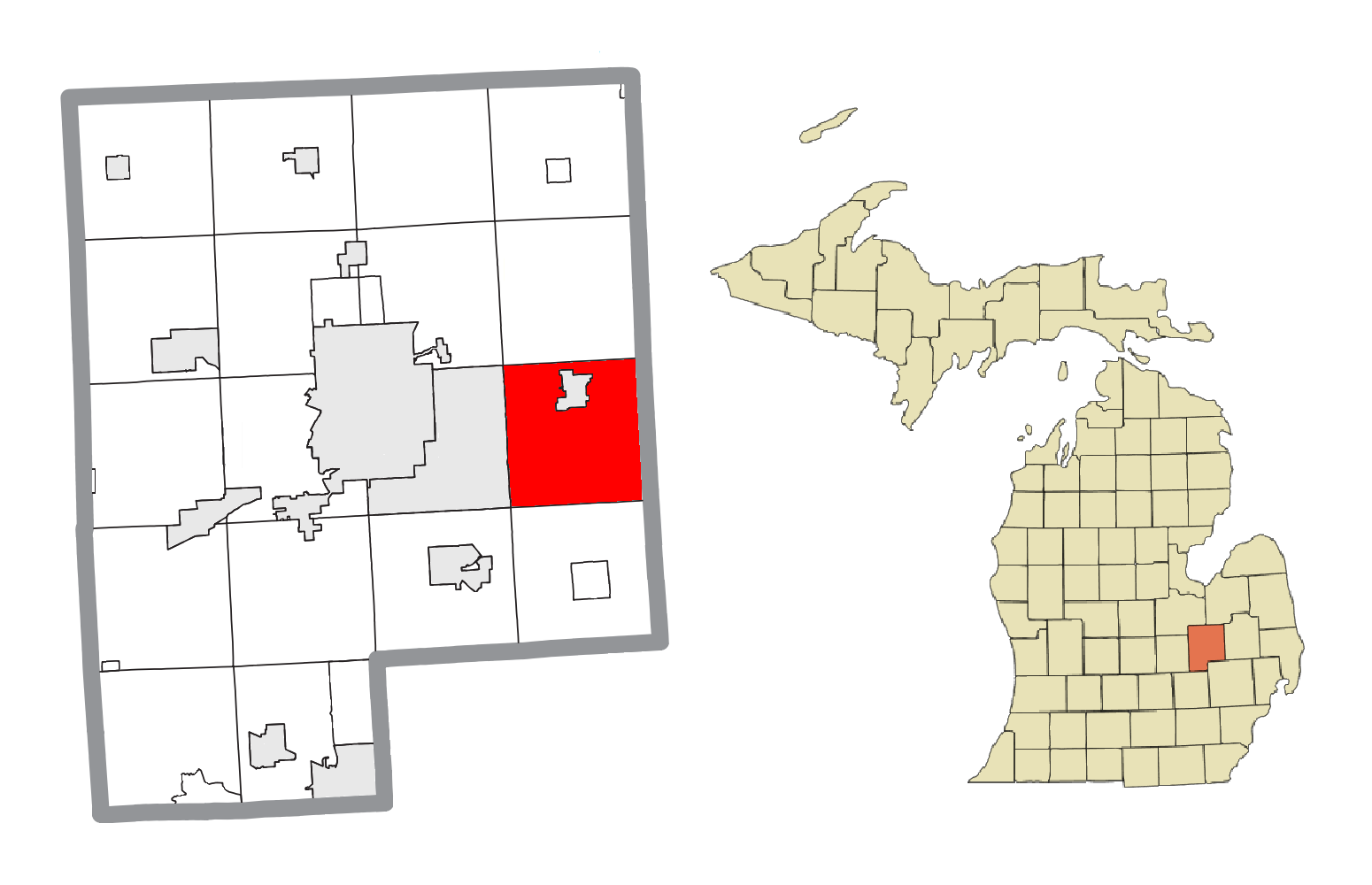
- Location within Genesee County

- Location within the state of Michigan Davison Township (the United States)
- Coordinates: 43°00′51″N 83°31′34″W
- Country: United States
- State: Michigan
- County: Genesee
- Settled: 1837
- Organized: 1840

Government
  - Supervisor: Jim Slezak
  - Clerk: Michael T. Leffler
  - Treasurer: Travis Howell
  - Trustees: Matthew D. Karr; Lori A. Tallman

Area
  - Total: 33.7 sq mi (87.3 km^{2})
  - Land: 33.5 sq mi (86.7 km^{2})
  - Water: 0.23 sq mi (0.6 km^{2}) 0.68%
- Elevation: 810 ft (247 m)

Population (2020)
  - Total: 20,434
  - Density: 610/sq mi (236/km^{2})
- Time zone: UTC-5 (EST)
  - Summer (DST): UTC-4 (EDT)
- ZIP code(s): 48423 (Davison); 48439 (Grand Blanc)
- Area code: 810
- FIPS code: 26-19900
- GNIS feature ID: 1626160
- Website: davisontwp-mi.gov

Township of Davison is a civil township of Genesee County in the U.S. state of Michigan consisting of the survey township of North 7 East 8 less the administratively autonomous city of Davison. The population was 20,434 at the 2020 census, up from 19,575 at the 2010 census.

Davison was named after Judge Norman Davison, a judge of Lapeer County and a delegate to state constitution convention of 1835. He resided in a nearby town formerly known as Davisonville, now known as Atlas.

== History ==
The Township was originally in Lapeer County and was formed from portions of Atlas and Richfield townships. Among the first purchasers of land were James Hosie, Thomas L. Brent, and Andrew Jesse Seelye. Hosie purchased portions of section 20 and section 21 on November 14, 1835. Brent purchased a portion of section 18 on March 16, 1836.

The Seelye family are the earliest known purchasers to reside within the land now part of Davison Township. Seelye visited his cousin in Waterford, Michigan in 1835 and subsequently purchased 240 acres in the future Davison Township section 33 during May 1836. Andrew was joined by his brother and sister, Alson and Debby, which all three established permanent residence in the spring of 1837. On March 28, 1837, Atlas Township highway commissioners Paul G. Davison and Asa Farrar laid out the first highway in the Atlas side of the township along the eastern side of section 31 to the section corner of 17, 18, 19 & 20. Ira Porter permanently settled in section 1 in January 1838 in the Richfield Township uphalf.

Goodenough Townsend and other residents of the survey township petitioned the legislature in 1839 to form a civil township government under the name of Middlebury. Since Shiawassee County already had an existing township using that name, the township was formed around April 6, 1840 under a different name, Davison, in honor of Norman Davison (Aug 1786 Ashford CT - 26 Mar 1841 Davisonville, Atlas Twp., MI) who was admired by many in the area. The first township meeting was held on at Townsend's home with Abel Seeley serving as moderator and Townsend elected by the 14 voters to be the first township supervisor. All but two voters held an office.

Davison Township was transferred from Lapeer County to Genesee County by act of the state legislature on March 9, 1843. In 1849, the Davison Centre Post Office was established with Townsend serving as postmaster until 1853.

In January, 2010, it was announced that Davison, Michigan City Manager Dale Martin and Davison Township Supervisor Kurt Soper had begun preliminary meetings discussing the possibility of merging the two municipalities.

On Monday November 27, 2017, the northern loop set of municipalities, including Davison, began receiving water from the Karegnondi Water Authority pipeline and treated by Genesee County Drain Commission Water and Waste Division.

== Geography ==
According to the United States Census Bureau, the township has a total area of 33.7 square miles (87 km^{2}), of which 33.5 square miles (87 km^{2}) is land and 0.2 square miles (0.52 km^{2}) (0.68%) is water.

The primary waterways are Black and Kearsley creeks. Davison Township shares two lakes with the neighboring township in Lapeer County, Elba Township, with Potter Lake (approximately 150 acres) in section 1 and Hasler Lake in section 36. Black Creek begins at Potter Lake in Elba traveling northwest into Richfield Township then turning south in Davison Township then heads west through Davison City to merge into Kearsley Creek near the western border in section 7.

== Demographics ==
Historical population
Census	Pop.	Note	%±
1960	4,948		—
1970	8,260		66.9%
1980	13,708		66.0%
1990	14,671		7.0%
2000	17,722		20.8%
2010	19,575		10.5%
Source: Census Bureau. Census 1960- 2000, 2010.

As of the census of 2000, there were 17,722 people, 7,455 households, and 4,733 families residing in the township. The population density was 529.1 inhabitants per square mile (204.3/km^{2}). There were 7,853 housing units at an average density of 234.5 per square mile (90.5/km^{2}). The racial makeup of the township was 94.30% White, 2.05% African American, 0.37% Native American, 0.87% Asian, 0.01% Pacific Islander, 0.51% from other races, and 1.89% from two or more races. Hispanic or Latino of any race were 2.09% of the population.

There were 7,455 households, out of which 30.4% had children under the age of 18 living with them, 50.2% were married couples living together, 10.0% had a female householder with no husband present, and 36.5% were non-families. 29.3% of all households were made up of individuals, and 7.7% had someone living alone who was 65 years of age or older. The average household size was 2.37 and the average family size was 2.97.

In the township the population was spread out, with 24.4% under the age of 18, 11.5% from 18 to 24, 29.7% from 25 to 44, 23.3% from 45 to 64, and 11.1% who were 65 years of age or older. The median age was 36 years. For every 100 females, there were 91.9 males. For every 100 females age 18 and over, there were 89.9 males.

The median income for a household in the township was $45,417, and the median income for a family was $57,716. Males had a median income of $45,197 versus $28,942 for females. The per capita income for the township was $23,595. About 4.9% of families and 6.3% of the population were below the poverty line, including 6.9% of those under age 18 and 3.8% of those age 65 or over.

== Government ==
The township receives water from the Karegnondi Water Authority pipeline treated by Genesee County Drain Commission Water and Waste Division.

Davison is part of the following:

- Genesee County Commissioner District 3
- Michigan House of Representatives District 68
- State Senate District 26
- 67th District Court Division 2
- Michigan's 8th Congressional District
- Genesee District Library

Educational services are primarily provided by Davison Community Schools while small parts of the township are served by Goodrich Area Schools.
