= Carman-Ainsworth High School =

Location
- 1300 North Linden Road; Flint Township, Michigan 48532; United States; 43°01′30″N 83°46′18″W

Information
- Type: Public secondary
- Motto: "Working Together to Guarantee Learning for Every Student"
- Established: 1967; 59 years ago
- Status: Currently operational
- School district: Carman-Ainsworth Community Schools
- CEEB code: 231473
- NCES School ID: 260789004373
- Principal: Charles LaClear
- Teaching staff: 49.26 (FTE)
- Grades: 9–12
- Enrollment: 914 (2024–2025)
- Student to teacher ratio: 18.55
- Campus type: Suburban
- Colors: Blue; Grey
- Athletics conference: Saginaw Valley League
- Mascot: Cavalier
- Rival: Grand Blanc High School
- Newspaper: CA Voice
- Feeder schools: Carman-Ainsworth Middle School
- Class/Div: Class A/Division 1
- Website: www.carman.k12.mi.us

Carman-Ainsworth High School is a high school in Flint Township, Michigan, United States. It is the only high school in the Carman-Ainsworth Community School district.

== History ==
Ainsworth High School opened in 1961, and Carman High School opened in 1967. In 1986, the Ainsworth High School student population was combined with Carman and adopted its current name, while Ainsworth became what is now Carman-Ainsworth Middle School.

== Demographics ==
Flint Carman-Ainsworth High School profile 2024-2025.

Grade	Students
9	208
10	265
11	204
12	237
Ungraded	-
Total	914

Male	Female
52%	48%

Enrollment	% of total
American Indian/Alaskan Native	>1%
Asian	>1%
Black	60%
Hawaiian Native/Pacific Islander	0%
Hispanic	>1%
White	22%
Two or more races	11%

== Athletics ==
The following sports offered by Carman-Ainsworth High School as of 2026-2027.

- Baseball (boys)
  - State Runner-up: 1981
- Basketball
  - Boys - State Runner-up: 2004, 2005. Semi-Finalist: 2025
  - Girls - State Runner-up: 2003, 2004.
- Competitive Cheer (girls)
- Cross Country
- Football
- Golf
- Soccer
- Softball (girls)
- Tennis
- Track and Field
  - Boys State Champions: 2005, 2008. Runner-up: 2004
- Volleyball
- Wrestling

== Notable alumni ==
Carman-Ainsworth High School's entrance hallway

- Brandon Carr, NFL cornerback for Baltimore Ravens, Dallas Cowboys
- Glenn Cosey, Professional Basketball player
- Jeff Hamilton, former MLB player (Los Angeles Dodgers)
- Jon Runyan, former NFL player and U.S. Representative
- Dan Skuta, NFL linebacker for San Francisco 49ers
- Tommy Stewart, drummer for Godsmack, Fuel, Everclear
