= Saginaw Valley League =

Sports league

The Saginaw Valley High School Association (commonly referred to as the Saginaw Valley League) is a high school sports league formed in 1904 within the Michigan High School Athletic Association (MHSAA), located in the Bay, Genesee, Isabella, Lapeer, Midland, and Saginaw counties in Michigan area.

== History ==
SVL was formed in the fall of 1904 with five teams: Bay City Eastern (Bay City Central), Bay City Handy (Bay City Western), Saginaw Eastern (Saginaw High), Arthur Hill, and Flint High (Flint Central).

In August 2012, the final four teams of the Big Nine Conference, Carman-Ainsworth, Davison, Flint Powers Catholic and Flushing, joined the league in its South Division. With the Flint Metro League losing Lapeer East and Lapeer West, Flushing and Carman-Ainsworth applied to join that league with Flushing's membership approved starting in the 2014-15 year.

Bay City John Glenn joined in 2017, but left in 2020. Grand Blanc joined in 2018.

Starting in 2021, Saginaw and Saginaw Arthur Hill formed a co-op team football in preparation for a high school merger. Traverse City Central and Traverse City West announced they would be joining the Red Division in 2022 as football-only members.

On June 12th, 2026, Grand Blanc and Davison announced their official departure from the SVL and their relocation to the Oakland Activities Association after the 2026-2027 school year.

== Member schools ==
The Saginaw Valley League currently has 14 member schools.

=== Current members ===
School	Nickname	Location	Joined	Previous Conference
North Division
Bay City Central	Wolves	Bay City		
Bay City Western	Warriors	Auburn	1974	Independent
Midland	Chemics	Midland		
Midland Dow	Chargers	Midland	1971, 1981	Independent
Mount Pleasant	Oilers	Mount Pleasant	2005	Independent
Traverse City West (football only)	Titans	Traverse City	2022	Big North
Traverse City Central (football only)	Trojans	Traverse City	2022	Big North
South Division
Davison	Cardinals	Davison	2012	Big Nine Conference
Flint Carman-Ainsworth	Cavaliers	Flint Township	2012	Big Nine Conference
Grand Blanc	Bobcats	Grand Blanc	2018	Kensington Lakes Activities Association
Lapeer	Lightning	Lapeer	2014	None (school opened)
Saginaw United	Phoenix	Saginaw	2024	None (school opened)
Saginaw Heritage	Hawks	Saginaw Township	1994	White Pine

=== Former members ===
School	Nickname	Location	Joined	Previous Conference	Departed	Successive Conference
Owosso	Trojans	Owosso	pre-1950		1951	Independent
Pontiac Central	Chiefs	Pontiac	pre-1950		1994	Oakland Activities Association
Flint Central	Indians	Flint	1904		2009	None (school closed)
Flint Northwestern	Wildcats	Flint	1969	Independent	2017	None (school closed)
Flint Southwestern	Colts	Flint	1961	Independent	2019	Genesee Area Conference
Bay City Handy	Wildcats	Bay City	1961	Arrowhead Conference	1980	Independent
Flint Northern	Vikings	Flint	pre-1950		2013	None (school closed)
Flushing	Raiders	Flushing Township	2012	Big Nine Conference	2014	Flint Metro League
Bay City Glenn	Bobcats	Bangor Township	2017	Independent	2020	Tri-Valley Conference
Saginaw	Trojans	Saginaw	1950	Independent	2024	Consolidated with Saginaw Arthur Hill to form Saginaw United
Saginaw Arthur Hill	Lumberjacks	Saginaw	1950	Independent	2024	Consolidated with Saginaw High to form Saginaw United
Flint Powers Catholic	Chargers	Flint	2012	Big Nine Conference	2022	Independent

- From 1969–1979, the Conference splint into a Saginaw Valley East and a Saginaw Valley West Conference. Many Conference Realignments happened during this time.

== Membership Timeline since 1950 ==
Saginaw Valley League
Saginaw Valley East
Saginaw Valley West
Football only

== List of Saginaw Valley League Conference Champions ==
=== Recent SVL Champions ===
Football
Year	North (Blue)	Coach	South (Red)	Coach	Season End
2016	Carman-Ainsworth	Jerry Parker	Davison (10-1)	Kyle Zimmerman	C-A (2-PDist loss to Fenton), Dav (1-Dist loss to Clarkston)
2017	HH Dow (7-3) Carman-Ainsworth (5-5)	Jason Watkins Jerry Parker	Midland (8-2)	Eric Methner	Dow (2-PDis loss to TC West), C-A (2-PDis loss to Fenton), M (2-Pdist loss to TC Central)
2018	Mt. Pleasant (10-1)	Jason MacIntyre	Lapeer (11-1)	Mike Smith	MTP (3-Dist loss to Cedar Springs), LAP (1-Reg loss to Clarkston)
2019	Midland High (8-2) HH Dow (7-4) Mt. Pleasant (7-3)	Eric Methner Jason Watkins Jason MacIntyre	Lapeer (9-2)	Mike Smith	M (2-PDis loss to Mona Shores), Dow (2-Dis loss to Mona Shores), MTP (3-PDis loss to Cedar Springs), LAP (1-Dis loss to Davison)
2020	Midland High (8-1)	Eric Methner	Davison (12-2)	Jake Wiengartz	M (2-Dist. Loss to TC Central), Dav (1-Finals loss to West Bloomfield)
2021	Mt. Pleasant (10-1)	Jason MacIntyre	Grand Blanc (12-1)	Clint Alexander	MTP (3-Dist. Loss to Dewitt), GB (1-Semi loss to Rochester Adams)
2022	Mt. Pleasant (9-2) Midland High (10-2)	Jason MacIntyre Eric Methner	Davison (9-2)	Jake Wiengartz	MTP (3-Dist loss to Dewitt), M (2-Reg loss to Dexter), DAV (1-Dist loss to Clarkston)
2023	Mt. Pleasant (9-2)	Jason MacIntyre	Davison (12-1)	Jake Wiengartz	MTP (3-Dist. Loss to Grand Rapids Forest Hills Central) DAV (1-Semi loss to Belleville)
2024	Midland High (9-2)	Tyler Wellman	Grand Blanc (9-3)	Kaleb Forr	M (2-Dist. Loss to Saginaw Heritage) GB (1-Reg loss to Rochester Adams)
2025	Mt. Pleasant (13-1)	Jason McIntyre	Grand Blanc (10-1)	Kaleb Forr	MTP (3-Final. Loss to DeWitt) GB (1-Dist. Loss to Clarkston)

=== Basketball ===
Boys/Girls Standings 21-22
Place	School	Record	Place	School	Record
1	Grand Blanc	12-0	1	Dow	11-0
2	Saginaw	10-1	2	Carman-Ainsworth	11-1
3	Carman-Ainsworth	10-2	3	Grand Blanc	10-2
4	Mt. Pleasant	8-4	4	Heritage	9-3
5	Arthur Hill	7-5	5	Davison	6-4
6	Davison	6-5	6	Saginaw	6-5
7	Midland	6-6	7	Central	5-6
8	Lapeer	6-6	8	Powers	4-8
9	Heritage	5-7	9	Western	4-8
10	Powers	3-9	10	Midland	4-8
11	Dow	2-10	11	Mt. Pleasant	4-8
12	Western	2-10	12	Arthur Hill	1-10
13	Central	0-12	13	Lapeer	0-12

Boys Basketball
Year	Valley	Coach	Season End
2021	Grand Blanc	Mike Thomas	Won D1 State Championship over Ann Arbor Huron
2022	Grand Blanc	Mike Thomas	Lost to Warren DLS in State Final
2023	Grand Blanc	Tory Jackson	Lost to Detroit Cass Tech in Semi final

Baseball
Year	SVL	
1962	Midland	
1966–1970	Midland	
1972	Midland	
1980	Midland	
1982	Midland	
1991	Midland	
1995	Midland	
1997	Midland	
2003	Bay City Central	
2004		
2005	Midland	
2006		
2007	Mount Pleasant	
2008	Bay City Western	
2009	Bay City Western	
2010	Midland	
2011	Mount Pleasant	
Year	North	South
2012	Bay City Western, Midland	
2013	Bay City Western	Flushing
2014	Bay City Central, Bay City Western	Flint Carman-Ainsworth

Boys' Basketball
Year	School	
Year	East	West
1980	Flint Central	Flint Northern
1981	Flint Central	
1982	Flint Central	
1983	Flint Northwestern	
1984	Flint Northwestern	
1985	Flint Northwestern	
1986	Flint Northwestern	
1987	Flint Northern, Saginaw	
1988	Saginaw	
1989	Flint Northwestern	
1990	Saginaw	
1991	Saginaw	
1992	Flint Northwestern	
1993	Flint Northwestern	
1994	Flint Central	
1995	Flint Northern	
1996	Flint Northwestern, Saginaw	
1997	Flint Southwestern	
1998	Flint Northwestern	
1999	Flint Northwestern	
2000	Flint Northwestern, Saginaw	
2001	Flint Northern	
2002	Saginaw	
2003	Saginaw	
2004	Saginaw	
2005	Saginaw	
2006	Flint Southwestern, Saginaw	
2007	Saginaw	
2008	Saginaw	
2009	Saginaw, Saginaw Arthur Hill	
2010	Saginaw Heritage	
2011	Saginaw	
2012	Saginaw	
Year	North	South
2013	Saginaw Arthur Hill	Carman-Ainsworth
2014	Saginaw Arthur Hill	Carman-Ainsworth
2015	Saginaw Arthur Hill	Flint Northwestern

Girls' Basketball
Year	North	South
2008	Saginaw Arthur Hill	
2009	Saginaw Arthur Hill	
2010	Saginaw Arthur Hill	Davidson
2011	MidlandDow	Powers Catholic
2012	Midland	Davison
2013	Midland Dow	Davison
2014	Midland	Powers Catholic
2015	Midland Dow	Powers Catholic

Boys' Cross Country
Year	School
1961–1962	Midland High School
1968	Midland High School
1972–1979	Midland High School
1980	Flint Central
1981	Flint Central
1982	Flint Central
1983	Bay City Central
1984	Flint Central
1985	Flint Northern
1986	Flint Northern
1987	Pontiac Central
1988	Pontiac Central
1989	Pontiac Central
1990	Flint Northwestern
1991	Pontiac Central
1992	Bay City Western
1993	Flint Central
1994	Bay City Western
1995	Midland
1996	Bay City Western
1997	Bay City Western
1998	Midland Dow
1999	Midland High School
2000	Midland High School
2001	Saginaw Heritage, Midland
2002	Midland Dow
2003	Midland Dow
2004	Saginaw Heritage
2005	Midland High School
2006	Bay City Western
2007	Saginaw Heritage
2008	Saginaw Heritage
2009	Saginaw Heritage
2010	Saginaw Heritage
2011	Saginaw Heritage
2012	Saginaw Heritage
2013	Saginaw Heritage
2014	Saginaw Heritage
2015	Bay City Western
2016	Saginaw Heritage

Girls' Cross Country
Year	School
2006	Saginaw Heritage
2007	
2008	
2009	Midland
2010	Midland Dow
2011	Midland Dow
2012	
2013	Bay City Western
2014	Bay City Western
2015	Midland Dow
2016	Midland Dow

Football
Year	SVL	
1980	Flint Northern, Midland	
1981	Saginaw Arthur Hill	
1982	Flint Northwestern, Saginaw Arthur Hill	
1983	Flint Northern, Flint Central, Midland	
1984	Midland	
1985	Flint Northern, Flint Central, Bay City Western	
1986	Flint Northern, Midland Dow	
1987	Midland	
1988	Flint Northern, Midland, Saginaw Arthur Hill	
1989	Midland	
1990	Saginaw Arthur Hill, Midland, Saginaw, Pontiac Central	
1991	Saginaw Arthur Hill, Midland	
1992	Saginaw Arthur Hill	
1993	Flint Central	
1994	Midland	
1995	Saginaw	
1996	Bay City Central	
1997	Saginaw, Midland Dow	
1998	Saginaw	
1999	Midland, Saginaw Heritage	
2000	Saginaw	
2001	Saginaw	
2002	Saginaw	
2003	Midland	
2004	Bay City Western	
2005	Midland Dow, Midland, Bay City Western	
2006	Saginaw Heritage	
2007	Bay City Central	
2008	Bay City Western	
2009	Mount Pleasant	
2010	Mount Pleasant	
2011	Mount Pleasant	
Year	North	South
2012	Midland	Flint Powers Catholic
2013	Mount Pleasant	Flint Carman-Ainsworth
Year	Blue	Red
2014	Midland Dow	Lapeer
2015	Midland Dow	Lapeer
2016	Flint Carman-Ainsworth	Davison
2017	Flint Carman-Ainsworth	Midland
Year	Red	Blue
2018	Mount Pleasant	Lapeer
2019	Midland Dow	Davison

Boys' Golf
Year	School
2006	
2008	
2009	
2010	Bay City Western High School
2011	Bay City Western High School
2012	
2013	
2014	Midland H. H. Dow High School
2015	

Girls' Golf
Year	School
2007	
2008	
2009	Midland Dow
2010	
2011	
2012	
2013	
2014	Midland Dow
2015	

Boys' Ice Hockey
Year	School
1985	Midland
1986	Saginaw Arthur Hill
1987	Midland
1988	Midland
1989	Midland
1990	Midland
1991	Midland
1992	Midland
1993	Midland
1994	Midland
1995	Midland
1996	Midland
1997	Midland
1998	Midland, Midland Dow
1999	Midland, Midland Dow
2000	Midland
2001	Midland
2002	Midland
2003	Midland
2004	Midland
2005	Midland
2006	Midland
2007	Midland
2008	Midland
2009	Midland
2010	Midland
2011	Midland
2012	Midland
2013	Flint Powers Catholic
2014	Bay City Central

Girls' Soccer
Year	North	South
2007	Midland	
2008		
2009		
2010		
2011	Midland Dow	Flint Powers Catholic
2012	Midland Dow	
2013	Mount Pleasant	Davison
2014	Midland Dow	Flint Powers Catholic
2015		

Boys' Soccer
Year	North	South
2006	Midland	
2007		
2008		
2009		
2010		
2011	Midland	
2012	Midland	
2013	Midland	Flint Powers Catholic
2014	Midland	Lapeer
2015	Saginaw Heritage	
2016	Midland Dow	

Softball
Year	North	South
2007	Midland Dow	
2008		Flint Powers Catholic
2009	Mount Pleasant	Flint Powers Catholic
2010	Mount Pleasant	Flint Powers Catholic
2011	Bay City Western	Davison
2012	Bay City Western	Davison High School
2013	Bay City Western	Flint Powers Catholic
2014	Bay City Western	Flint Powers Catholic

Boys' Swimming
Year	School
2003	Midland Dow
2004	Midland Dow
2005	Midland Dow
2006	Midland Dow
2007	Midland Dow
2008	Midland Dow
2009	Midland Dow
2010	Midland Dow
2011	Midland Dow
2012	Midland Dow
2013	Midland Dow
2014	Midland Dow
2015	Midland Dow
2016	Midland Dow
2017	Midland Dow
2018	Midland Dow

Girls' Swimming
Year	School
2006	Midland Dow
2005	
2007	Midland Dow
2008	Midland Dow
2009	Midland Dow
2010	Saginaw Heritage
2011	Davison
2012	Midland Dow
2013	Flint Powers Catholic
2014	Saginaw Heritage

Boys' Tennis
Year	North	South
2006	Midland Dow	Flushing
2007	Midland Dow	Flushing
2008	Midland Dow	Flushing
2009	Midland Dow	Flushing
2010	Midland Dow	Flushing
2011	Midland Dow	Flushing
2012	Midland Dow	Flushing
2013	Midland Dow	Flushing
2014	Midland Dow	Flushing

Girls' Tennis
Year	School
1991	Midland Dow
1992	Midland Dow
1993	Midland Dow
1994	Midland Dow
1995	Midland Dow
1996	Midland
1997	Midland Dow
1998	Midland Dow
1999	Midland Dow
2000	Midland Dow
2001	Midland Dow
2002	Midland Dow
2003	Midland Dow
2004	Midland Dow
2005	Midland Dow
2006	Midland Dow
2007	Midland Dow
2008	Midland Dow
2009	Midland Dow
2010	Midland Dow
2011	Midland Dow
2012	Midland Dow
2013	Midland Dow
2014	Midland Dow
2015	Midland Dow
2016	Midland Dow
2017	Midland Dow
2018	Midland Dow
2019	Midland Dow
2021	Midland Dow
2022	Midland Dow
2023	Midland Dow
2024	Midland Dow
2025	Midland Dow

Boys' Track & Field
Year	School
1995	Midland High School
1996	Midland High School
1999	Midland High School
2000	Saginaw Heritage
2001	Saginaw Heritage
2002	Saginaw Heritage
2003	Midland Dow
2004	Midland Dow
2005	Bay City Central
2006	Bay City Central
2007	Midland High School
2008	Flint Southwestern
2009	Midland High School
2010	Bay City Western
2011	Bay City Western
2012	Bay City Western
2013	Carman-Ainsworth
2014	Carman-Ainsworth
2015	

Girls' Track & Field
Year	School
2007	Saginaw Heritage
2008	Flint Southwestern
2009	Flint Southwestern
2010	Saginaw Arthur Hill
2011	Midland High School
2012	Bay City Central
2013	Midland High School
2014	Midland High School
2015	

Girls' Volleyball
Year	Blue	Red
2007	Midland	
2008		
2009	Midland Dow	
2010		
2011	Midland	
2012	Midland	Flushing
2013	Bay City Western	Flushing
2014	Midland Dow	Lapeer
2015		

Wrestling
Year	School
2006–2007	
2008	Mount Pleasant
2009	Saginaw Heritage
2010	Bay City Western
2011	Midland Dow
2012	Bay City Western
2013	Davison
2014	Davison
2015	Davison
