= William H. Haithco Sr. =

William "Bill" H. Haithco Sr. RPh
- Born: February 7, 1923; Saginaw, Michigan
- Died: March 17, 2011 (aged 88); Fayetteville, Georgia
- Education: University of Michigan College of Pharmacy (1952)
- Occupation: Pharmacist
- Title: Chairman, Saginaw County Parks and Recreation Commission
- Term: 1972 to 1999
- Predecessor: Founder
- Spouse: Nancy Olivia Fisher (divorced)
- Children: William H. Haithco II (died 2009); Shari Lin Clarke; Jai Spencer Haithco, Sr. Shelly Marie Haithco (died 1964)
- Parent(s): William Joseph Haithco (1893 – 1981); Lady Celes Dabney (1899 – 1993)

William "Bill" H. Haithco Sr. (February 7, 1923 – March 17, 2011) was an African American businessman and community leader from Saginaw County, Michigan.

== Personal ==
Haithco was born in Saginaw, Michigan on February 7, 1923, to William Joseph Haithco and Lady Celes Dabney Haithco. He spent much of his life in Saginaw County and moved to Fayetteville, Georgia in 1998, but continued to visit Saginaw County parks on trips back to Michigan.

He graduated from Arthur Hill High School in 1940. After being honorably discharged from the United States Army, he attended Michigan State College (now Michigan State University), graduating in 1950 becoming a registered pharmacist at the University of Michigan College of Pharmacy in 1952.

Haithco married Nancy Olivia Fisher and had four children, William Harold Haithco II, Shari Lin Clarke, Rev. Jai Spencer Haithco, and Shelly Marie Haithco.

His autobiography, From the Farm to the Pharmacist and Beyond, was published in 2007.

Haithco died at the home he shared with his daughter Shari in Fayetteville, Georgia on March 17, 2011, at the age of 88.

== Professional ==
Haithco opened Haithco Prescription Pharmacy at 1800 Wadsworth in Saginaw in 1957 following his employment at Kent Drug Store and Saginaw County Hospital. In 1972, he joined the pharmacy staff at Saginaw General Hospital.

== Community involvement ==
Haithco founded the Saginaw County Parks and Recreation Commission in 1969 and served as its chairman from 1972 to 1999.

In 1972, he joined the Board of Directors of the Saginaw General Credit Union, and served as president for ten years.

He also served as president of the University Of Michigan College Of Pharmacy Alumni Board Of Governors.

== Honors ==
Haithco received numerous community, state, and national awards related to his professional role, community service, and volunteerism.

On July 1, 1970, he received the A.H. Robins Bowl of Hygeia Award for community service in pharmacy. He received the award at Boyne Mountain Resort and his photographed appeared in Time Magazine.

William H. Haithco Recreation Area was named in his honor in 1991 and Haithco Lake was named for Haithco in May 1991.

He received the status as an honored alumnus of Arthur Hill High School, the National Association of County Parks and Recreations Officials Outstanding Volunteer Award, and also the U.S. Pharmacist / Searle Service To The Community Award in 1994.

The William H. Haithco Student Community Service Award was created in 2002 by the Michigan Pharmacy Foundation in honor of his service to his community and to the profession of pharmacy.

He was awarded the 2003 University of Michigan Alumni Association Distinguished Alumni Service Award.
