= Davison Community Schools =

School district in Michigan, United States

Address
- 1490 North Oak Road Davison, Genesee County, Michigan, 48423; United States
- Coordinates: 43°01′52″N 83°31′01″W

District information
- Motto: Where kids come first and futures begin.
- Grades: PreKindergarten–12
- President: Holly Halabicky
- Vice-president: Granger Stefanko
- Superintendent: Matthew Loban
- Schools: 9
- Budget: $102,272,000 2022–2023 total expenditures
- NCES District ID: 2611430

Students and staff
- Students: 5,460 (2024–2025)
- Teachers: 323.64 (on an FTE basis) (2024–2025)
- Staff: 717.53 FTE (2024–2025)
- Student–teacher ratio: 16.87 (2024–2025)
- Athletic conference: Saginaw Valley League
- District mascot: Cardinals
- Colors: Maroon; Gold

Other information
- Website: www.davisonschools.org

Davison Community Schools is a public school district in the Flint, Michigan, area. In Genesee County, it serves Davison, part of Burton, and parts of the townships of Atlas, Davison, and Richfield. In Lapeer County, it serves parts of Elba and Oregon townships.

== History ==
The beginnings of Davison's school district date to 1850, when children were taught in a log cabin. In 1885, a two-story school was built near the current site of Davison city hall. It housed all twelve grades as of 1907, the official founding year of the district.

On the night of March 21, 1930, the school burned in a devastating fire. A new Davison School opened in February 1932 and originally cost $98,000. It is currently used as Central Elementary. In fall 1962, a new high school opened, designed by architecture firm Nurmi-Nelson of Flint. It served as the high school for only ten years before the current high school opened. The 1962 building then became the district's middle school. Several elementary schools opened in the late 1950s and early 1960s.

The current Davison High School was ninety percent complete by the summer of 1971, but the district needed a millage approval by voters to fund its operation. The school sat empty for one year. Voters rejected the millage proposal several times before approving it in February 1972 for a fall 1972 opening.

In fall 1998, Hahn Intermediate School opened. The district was growing at the time, and the building had a capacity of 825 seventh- and eighth-graders. The design put an emphasis on comfort, with ample windows and "air-conditioned and carpeted classrooms, and soundproof acoustical panels throughout hallways and the gymnasium," according to the Flint Journal.

Central Elementary underwent an extensive renovation and reopened in fall 2014 after the $11.9 million project.

In March 2020, district voters approved a $71.39 million bond issue to improve district facilities. One of the major projects was a 1,000-seat auditorium at the high school, which opened in fall 2024.

== Gallery ==
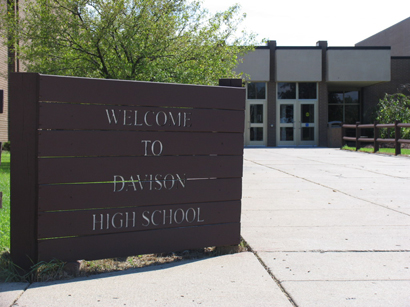
Davison High School

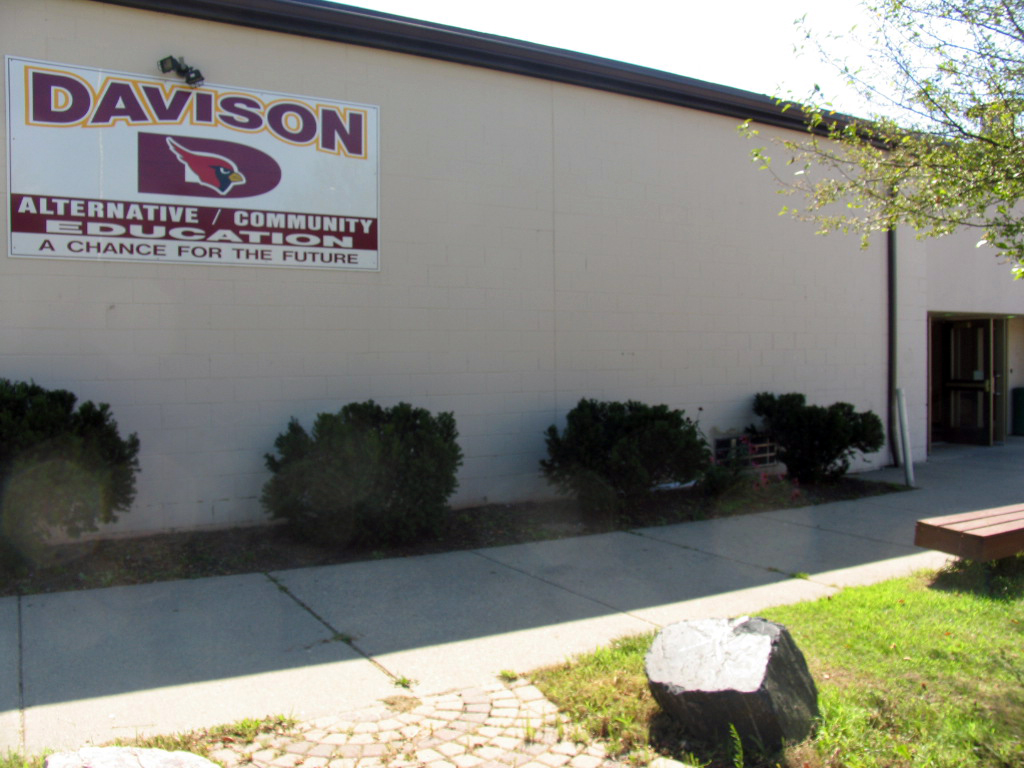
Davison Alternative High School

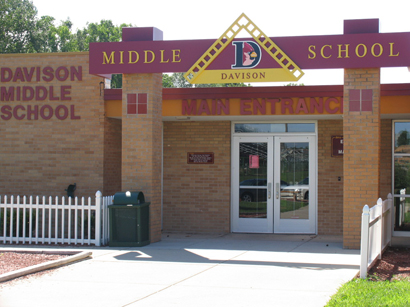
Davison Middle School

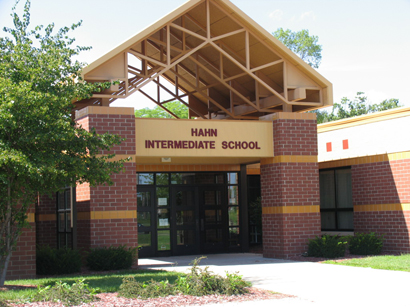
Hahn Intermediate

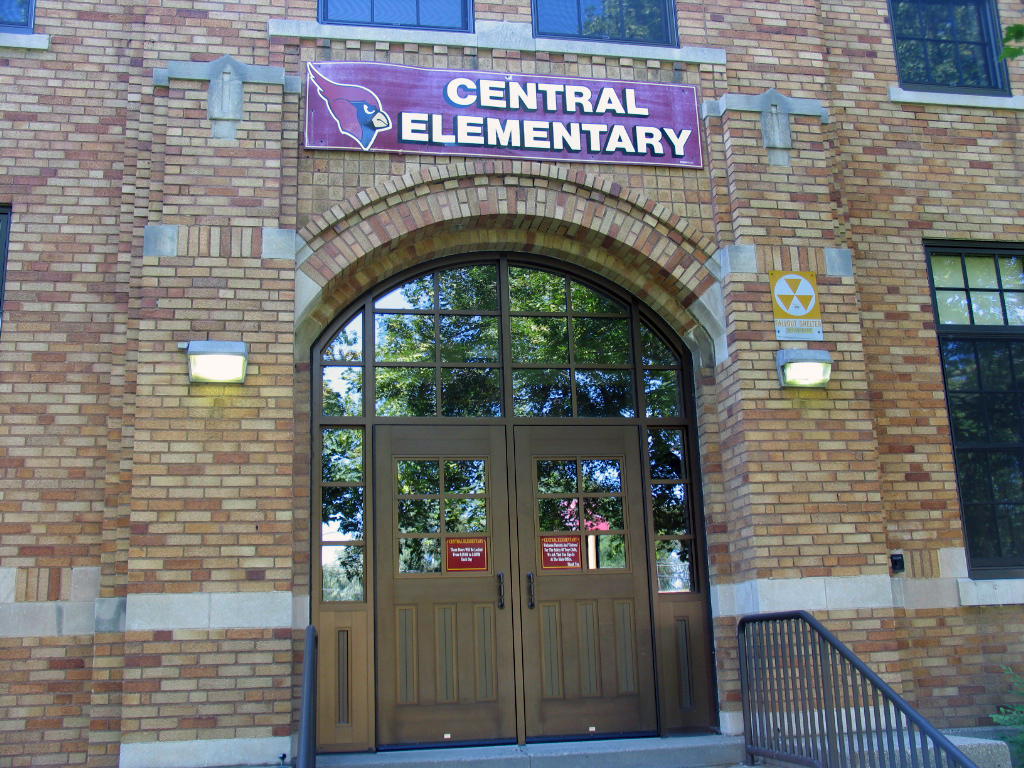
Central Elementary

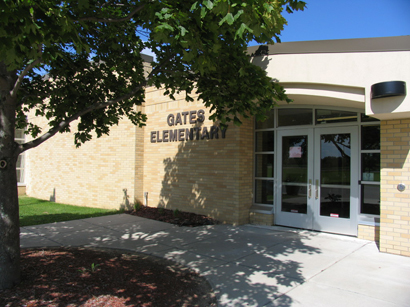
Gates Elementary

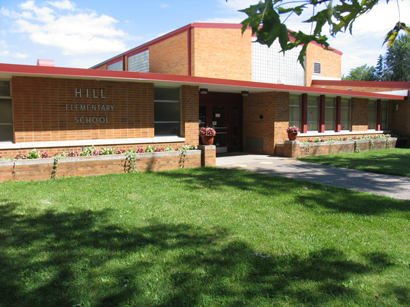
Hill Elementary

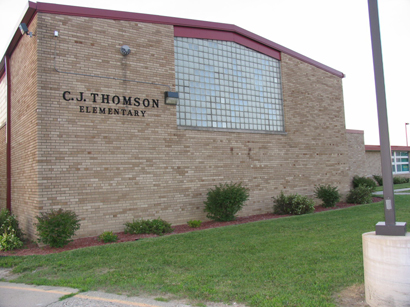
Thompson Elementary

== Schools ==
Schools in Davison Community Schools district
| School | Address | Notes |
|---|---|---|
| Davison High School | 1250 N. Oak Road, Davison | Grades 9–12; built 1971 |
| Davison Middle School | 600 S. Dayton Street, Davison | Grades 7-8; built 1962 |
| Hahn Intermediate School | 500 S. Dayton Street, Davison | Grades 5-6; built 1998 |
| Central Elementary | 600 S. State Street, Davison | Grades 1-4; built 1932 |
| Gates Elementary | G-2359 S. Irish Road, Davison | Grades 1-4; built 1966 |
| Hill Elementary | 404 Aloha St., Davison | Grades K-4; built 1958. |
| Siple Elementary | 9286 E. Coldwater Road, Davison | Grades K-4; built 1964; formerly known as North Elementary |
| Thomson Elementary | 617 E. Clark St., Davison | Grades PreK-K; built 1959 |
| Davison Alternative Education | 1250 N. Oak Road, Davison | Alternative high school housed at Davison High School |
| Cardinal Center | 1490 N. Oak Road, Davison | Preschool and administration office |
