= Arthur Hill High School =

Public high school in Saginaw, Michigan

Location
- 3115 Mackinaw Street; Saginaw, Michigan 48602; United States; 43°25′49″N 83°59′25″W

Information
- School type: Public, high school
- Established: 1904
- School district: Saginaw Public School District
- Superintendent: Ramont Roberts
- CEEB code: 233280
- NCES School ID: 263039006656
- Principal: Kasydra Goode-Tibbs
- Teaching staff: 32.84 (2017-18) (on an FTE basis)
- Grades: 9-12
- Enrollment: 700 (2017-18)
- Student to teacher ratio: 21.32 (2017-18)
- Campus type: Urban
- Colors: Navy blue and gold
- Athletics conference: Saginaw Valley League
- Nickname: Lumberjacks
- Rival: Saginaw High School
- Accreditation: North Central Association
- Website: www.spsd.net/ahhs/

Arthur Hill High School was a public high school in Saginaw, Michigan, United States. It served students in grades 9–12 as one of three high schools in the Saginaw Public School District.

== History ==
The school was founded in the early 1900s (more information needed) and named after a successful lumbering and shipping owner, local mayor Arthur Hill. He was president of the school board for five years as well as the mayor of Saginaw three times. AHHS served the Saginaw school district for well over 100 years.

In 2024, Arthur Hill students were moved to the newly built Saginaw United High School as part of the school district's consolidation plan. The former Arthur Hill building is currently in use as the campus for Saginaw Arts and Sciences Academy.

== Academics ==
Student assessments
- 2021–22 school year Change vs. prior year

M-STEP 11th grade proficiency rates (Science / Social Studies)
- Advanced %: ≤5 / ≤5
- Proficient %: – / ≤5
- PR. Proficient %: 7.1 / –
- Not Proficient %: 86.5 / –

Average test scores
- SAT Total: 789.5 (▼ −59)

Arthur Hill High School was accredited by the North Central Association of Colleges and Schools (NCA) from 1904.

== Demographics ==
The demographic breakdown of the 700 students enrolled for 2017-18 was:

- Male - 50.9%
- Female - 49.1%
- Asian - 0.4%
- Black - 64.7%
- Hispanic - 20.0%
- Native Hawaiian/Pacific islanders - 0.1%
- White - 14.7%
- Multiracial - 0.1%

78.0% of the students were eligible for free or reduced-cost lunch. For 2017–18, Hill was a Title I school.

== Athletics ==
The Arthur Hill Lumberjacks competed in the Saginaw Valley League. The school colors were navy blue and gold. The following Michigan High School Athletic Association (MHSAA) sanctioned sports were offered:

- Baseball (boys)
- Basketball (girls and boys)
  - Boys state champion - 1944, 2006
- Bowling (girls and boys)
- Competitive cheerleading (girls)
- Cross country (girls and boys)
- Football (boys)
  - State champion - 1991
- Golf (boys)
  - Boys state champion - 1966
- Soccer (girls and boys)
- Softball (girls)
- Tennis (girls and boys)
- Track and field (girls and boys)
  - Boys state champion - 1944
- Volleyball (girls)
- Wrestling (boys)

Although swimming and diving were no longer offered by the school at time of closing, the Lumberjacks were boys state champion in 1945 and 1946. Arthur Hill's 1973 varsity football team went undefeated (9–0), unscored upon (444–0), was unanimously voted No. 1 in all statewide media polls, and is still considered one of the greatest teams in Michigan history.

== Notable alumni ==
- Harry Hawkins — All-American football player for the University of Michigan, 1923–1925
- Dick Rifenburg (Class of 1944) — football player for the Michigan Wolverines and Detroit Lions. He led the Big Ten Conference in single season receptions during his senior year and set Michigan Wolverines receptions records for both career touchdown and single-season touchdowns.
- Howard Patterson - (Class of 1945) 1948 London Olympic participant in the 100-meter backstroke for the U.S., he swam on the 1945 Arthur Hill State Championship swimming team, and was an All American at Michigan State University.
- Loren Dietrich (Class of 1948) - all state in football and baseball in 1948. Played college football at Central Michigan University where he became CMU's very first football MVP. Enlisted in the Army and played on the Army football team that toured post-war Germany, including Berlin and the Olympic Stadium. Coached Michigan Lutheran Seminary to a football state championship in 1986 and was inducted into the Saginaw County Sports Hall of Fame in 2016.
- Theodore Roethke — Poet, 1954 Pulitzer Prize winner
- Jack O'Brien (Class of 1957) — Broadway director
- Christopher Currell (Class of 1967) - touring member of Michael Jackson's Bad World Tour (1987–89); played synclavier on Michael Jackson's Bad album (1987).
- Curt Young (Class of 1978) — current pitching coach of the San Francisco Giants, and MLB player (Oakland Athletics, Kansas City Royals, New York Yankees)
- Stephen Lynch (Class of 1989) — professional comedian, Broadway star, Tony Award nominee
- Shonte Peoples (Class of 1989) — football player for the Michigan Wolverines
- Sam Sword (Class of 1994) — football player, Colts
- Jason Richardson (Class of 1999) - National Basketball Association (NBA) shooting guard
- Dar Tucker (Class of 2007) — basketball player, DePaul University
- Ed Albosta — Major League Baseball (MLB) pitcher
- Alfonso Boone — National Football League (NFL) defensive end
- Craig Dill – American Basketball Association (ABA) center
- Adam Emmenecker — college basketball point guard
- Joel Engardio - politician
- William H. Haithco Sr. — businessman and community leader
- Clifton Ryan — Defensive Lineman, St. Louis Rams

== Notable staff alumni ==
- George Ihler, football head coach of the undefeated and unscored upon 1973 football team.
