= Midland Public Schools =

School district in Michigan

Address
- 600 E Carpenter Street Midland, Midland County, Michigan, 48640; United States
- Coordinates: 43°36′52.6″N 84°14′03.6″W

District information
- Type: Public
- Motto: Inspiring Excellence
- Grades: PreK–12
- Established: 1919; 107 years ago
- Superintendent: Penny Miller-Nelson
- Asst. superintendent(s): Brian Brutyn
- Schools: 13
- Budget: $119,447,000 2022-2023 expenditures
- NCES District ID: 2623820

Students and staff
- Students: 7,380 2024-2025
- Teachers: 438.44 FTE 2024-2025
- Staff: 937.83 FTE 2024-2025
- Student–teacher ratio: 16.83 2024-2025

Other information
- Website: https://www.midlandps.org/

Midland Public Schools (MPS) is a public school district and Educational Service Agency (ESA) located in Midland, Michigan, United States. According to the US News and World Report, Dow High School ranked 38th and Midland High School ranked 90th among 1,136 high schools in the state. The Niche website scored MPS as an "A-" and the top school district among 22 districts in the Saginaw Area. Only 34 school districts offer the International Baccalaureate Diploma in Michigan; MPS is one of them.

== History ==
The roots of Midland Public Schools began in 1857 with an unnamed building on the corner of Ashman and Ellsworth Streets with 11 students. In 1862 an addition was constructed.

Midland's population surged with demand for white pine lumber after the Civil War. The 1872 Union School was built on the outskirts of town for grades 1-12. The three-story building (plus basement) was constructed in Italianate architecture using brick with a wood interior of black walnut. The cost was $20,000 plus another $3,000 for a "complete science laboratory". It was well lighted, ventilated and used steam radiators for heat. The building was the pride of the community, also used for voting and town meetings. Ten years later, there were 14 teachers and an impressive library with 708 books. An $8,000 addition was built in 1887 with more classrooms. At the turn of the century, it was used exclusively for high school students. One night in October 1908 the steam boiler exploded, and the resulting fire destroyed the school.

A replacement school on the site was constructed the following year using insurance and a large donation from Herbert Henry Dow of the Dow Chemical Company. The institution was renamed Central High School. A Junior High School was added to the property in 1917.

By the mid-1930s, the student population had grown and the second, larger high school was built in 1937. The 1908 first high school was used as an elementary school, then as the intermediate school until Northeast Middle School (then Northeast Intermediate) was opened in 1950. Student populations climbed higher and in 1954, a $4.7 million bond approved by voters. A third high school in Midland was completed in late 1955, named Midland High School and their nickname was "Chemics". For the 1956-57 school year, the high school moved to the new building and the 1937 Central High School became Central Intermediate, the second middle school in Midland. The 1908 (first) MHS was torn down in 1957. For the 1963-64 school year, Jefferson Intermediate was opened to handle children from the Post-World War II baby boom. Midland High School was overcrowded again, but the decision was made to build a second high school in Midland, less than ten years after the current MHS was completed. Herbert Henry Dow High School opened to sophomores in 1968 and added one grade each year until the first class graduated in 1971. A freshman class was added to high schools in 1997 and intermediate schools changed from grades 7-8-9 to 6-7-8; school names were changed from Intermediate to Middle School. Elementary schools gained classrooms when they lost grade 6.

== Board ==
MPS is controlled by a seven-member school board chosen in a staggered non-partisan election in even-numbered years. Terms are for six years and vacancies are filled by a vote of the remaining board members. The superintendent is appointed by the board and serves under contract at the pleasure of the board. The board also elects a president, vice-president, secretary and treasurer from their members. The remaining three members are known as trustees. The board holds monthly public meetings at the Midland Public Schools Administration Center on Carpenter Street.

Num	Member	End Term	Office
1	Judy J. Gunderson	2030	PRESIDENT
2	Jeffrey J. Wagner	2028	VICE PRESIDENT
3	Gina Wilson	2028	SECRETARY
4	Kevin A. Heye	2030	TREASURER
5	Kimberlee K. Baczewski	2030	TRUSTEE
6	Bill Leibfritz	2032	TRUSTEE
7	David Sommer	2032	TRUSTEE

The Superintendent is JOHN SEARLES

== Consolidation ==
As Michigan's economy worsened in 2009, the school board debated alternatives to reduce expenses in preparation for a $3–6 million reduction in state funding. Enrollment had been declining for several years to a point where the district's 12 elementary schools were below two-thirds capacity and several needed to be closed. Only one elementary school was projected to close for the 2009-2010 school year, but three more were planned for 2010-2011 when students zoned for Central Middle School would be sent to Jefferson and Northeast Middle Schools. Consolidation of the district's administrative offices was proposed, as well as relocation to a closed elementary school.

On December 15, 2009, the board elected to close five (5) elementary schools beginning with the 2010-2011 school year. The schools chosen for closure were Chippewassee, Longview, Parkdale, Mills, and Cook. The majority of the students of these schools were moved to other elementary schools in the district. Parkdale Elementary was demolished in December 2015 and left a green space.

Central Middle School was closed for instruction at the end of the 2012-13 school year, although the building was then actively used for entertainment, sporting and administrative purposes. Remaining students were moved to Jefferson and Northeast Middle Schools. The original building's auditorium was later renovated while most other parts of the building were demolished. In February 2016, plans were approved for a new STEM-focused elementary school to be built at the same location. The new school, Central Park Elementary, opened in September 2017.

The 2016 Dow High School improvement plan stated that the Dow Chemical Company was the major area employer and had been downsizing since 2012, resulting in a decrease of 160 students. The merger of Dow Corning and DuPont was expected to exacerbate the situation.

Eastlawn Elementary School, which was constructed after World War II ended, was closed in 2017 with students directed to the new Central Park Elementary nearby. The building was demolished in May 2020 and the land was destined for housing. Carpenter Street School was also closed in 2017. It was constructed in 1927, with the facility repurposed as a preschool building, but it is nearing the end of its useful life. with students also going to Central Park Elementary.

Franklin Center was torn down in February 2020.

== Bond proposal ==
In early January 2025, a facilities improvement bond proposal for $285 million was approved by the school board. The bond was intended to construct a new Northeast Middle School which was nearing the end of its useful life, a new elementary school, upgraded athletic facilities and technology. On the May 6 ballot, it was soundly defeated, nearly 3-1. It would have increased yearly property taxes by $325/$100K in taxable value. Voters cited increasing prices and academic performance.

== Current facilities ==
Facilities in Midland Public Schools District
School name	Address	Built	Size	Mascot	Website
Elementary schools (Grades K-5)
Adams Elementary School	1005 Adams Dr, Midland, MI 48642	1962	54,535 sq ft (5,066.5 m^{2})	Atoms	https://ade.midlandps.org
Carpenter Pre-Primary Center	1407 W Carpenter St, Midland, MI 48640	1926	37,934 sq ft (3,524.2 m^{2})	Formerly Carpenter School	https://cpp.midlandps.org
Central Park Elementary School	1400 Rodd St, Midland, MI 48640	2017	86,028 sq ft (7,992.3 m^{2})	Explorers	https://cpe.midlandps.org
Chestnut Hill Elementary School	3900 Chestnut Hill Dr, Midland, MI 48642	1957	52,308 sq ft (4,859.6 m^{2})	Chipmunks	https://che.midlandps.org
Plymouth Elementary School	1105 East Sugnet Rd, Midland, MI 48642	1952	50,182 sq ft (4,662.1 m^{2})	Pioneers	https://pme.midlandps.org
Siebert Elementary School	5700 Siebert St, Midland, MI 48642	1958	58,157 sq ft (5,403.0 m^{2})	Bulldogs	https://sbe.midlandps.org
Woodcrest Elementary School	5500 Drake St, Midland, MI 48640	1969	50,923 sq ft (4,730.9 m^{2})	Wolverines	https://wce.midlandps.org
Middle schools (Grades 6-8)
Jefferson Middle School	800 W Chapel Ln, Midland, MI 48640	1963	112,246 sq ft (10,428.0 m^{2})	Huskies	https://jms.midlandps.org
Northeast Middle School	1305 E Sugnet Rd, Midland, MI 48642	1950	145,847 sq ft (13,549.6 m^{2})	Vikings	https://nms.midlandps.org
High Schools (Grades 9-12)
Herbert Henry Dow High School	3901 N Saginaw Rd, Midland, MI 48640	1967	278,696 sq ft (25,891.7 m^{2})	Chargers	https://dhs.midlandps.org
Midland High School	1301 Eastlawn Dr, Midland, MI 48642	1955	294,618 sq ft (27,370.9 m^{2})	Chemics	https://mhs.midlandps.org
Windover Alternative High School	919 Smith Rd, Midland, MI 48642	1988	33,334 sq ft (3,096.8 m^{2})	Bulldogs	https://windover.org
Other facilities
MPS Administration Center	600 E Carpenter St, Midland, MI 48640	1969	27,558 sq ft (2,560.2 m^{2})		https://www.midlandps.org/home
Central Auditorium	305 E. Reardon St, Midland, MI 48640	1937	53,596 sq ft (4,979.2 m^{2})		https://aud.midlandps.org/
Grounds Building	411 E. Hines St, Midland, MI 48640	1984	7,700 sq ft (720 m^{2})		
Transportation/Maintenance	410 E. Hines St, Midland, MI 48640	1965	21,000 sq ft (2,000 m^{2})		
Industrial/Storage	215 Fast Ice Dr, Midland, MI 48640	2010	44,171 sq ft (4,103.6 m^{2})		
Midland Community Stadium	2600 Washington St, Midland, MI 48642	1958	1,490 sq ft (138 m^{2})	Concession stand	
		1987	4,140 sq ft (385 m^{2})	Visitors Locker room	
		2019	1,200 sq ft (110 m^{2})	Press box	

== Former schools ==
Former Schools in Midland Public Schools District
Elementary schools (Grades K-5)
School name	Address	Opened	Closed	Disposition	Info
Ashman School	2900 Dauer St	1950	1968	vacant	
Carpenter Street Elementary	1407 W Carpenter St	1926	2017	Pre-Primary	
Chippewassee Elementary	3018 Avon St	1959	2011	Windover Alternative	
Cook Elementary	5500 Perrine Rd	1957	2010	demo 2015	
Eastlawn Elementary	115 Eastlawn Dr	1947	2017	demo 2020	
Glasgow Elementary	390 Vance Rd	1961	2010	demolished	
Longview Elementary	337 Lemke St	1948	2010	Early Childhood Center	
Mapleton Elementary	4729 E Smiths Crossing	1931	1986	demo 2020	
Midland Elementary	305 E Reardon St	1908	1957	demolished	
Mills Elementary	3329 E. Baker Rd	1953	2010	sold 2018	
Parkdale Elementary	1609 Eastlawn Dr	1956	2010	demo 2015	
State Street Elementary	815 State St	1919	1976	demo 2022	science resource center 1990
Sugnet Elementary	3917 Jefferson Ave	1949	1987	MCESA	
Windover Elementary	Homer Rd	1949	1984	1987 Windover Alternative	
Middle schools (Grades 6-8)
School name	Address	Opened	Closed	Disposition	Info
Midland Junior High School	305 E Reardon St	1917	1950	demo 1957	formerly Central High School
Central Intermediate	1400 Rodd Street	1956	2016	demo 2016	formerly Midland High School #1
High Schools (Grades 9-12)
Union School	205 E Grove St	1872	1907	destroyed	
Central High School	305 E Reardon St	1908	1937	Midland Elementary	
Midland High School #1	1400 Rodd Street	1937	1955	Central Intermediate	

== Demographics ==
The demographic breakdown of the 7,436 students enrolled in 2022-23 was:

- White – 90%
- Hispanic or Latino – 4%
- Black or African American – 2%
- American Indian/Alaska Native – <1%
- Asian – 3%
- Native Hawaiian/Pacific Islander – <1%
- Two or More Races – 3%
- Other - 2%

== MPS-TV ==
The school district has its own community cable and IPTV Public-access television channel known as 'MPS-TV which began on March 17, 2003. Community surveys showed that residents supported educational CATV, prompting a partnership between the city of Midland, MPS, Charter Communications and AT&T U-Verse. Initial costs were covered by franchise fees paid to the city.

== Athletic facilities ==
Midland Community Stadium, which seats 7,500, is located next door to Midland High School, but is shared by both schools as their home field for football & soccer games and track meets. Dow High School has a field with limited seating and no lighting that is used primarily for daytime junior varsity contests.
Dow High School has an indoor pool with spectator seating for 1,000 that is shared by both schools as their home pool.

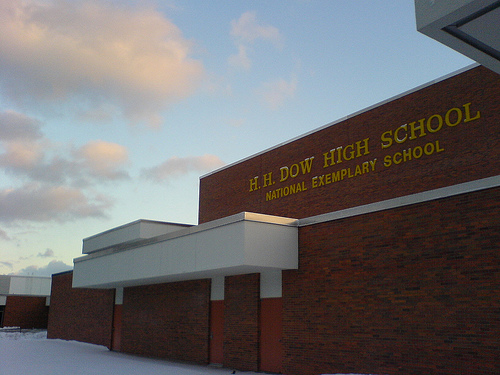
Dow High School

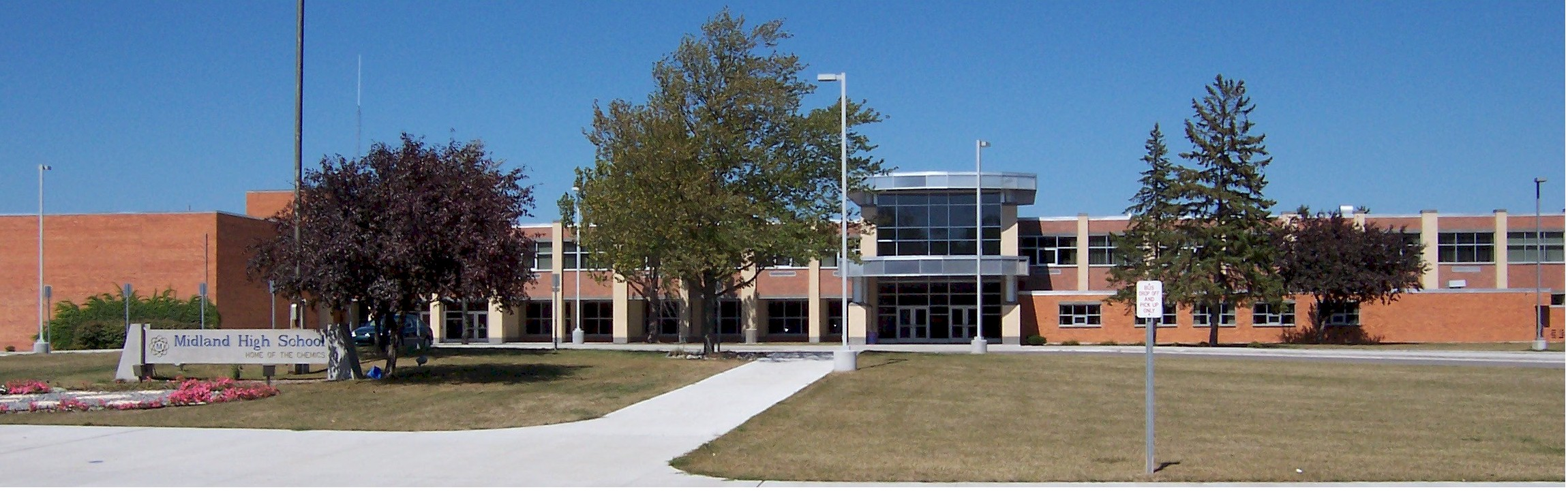
Midland High School

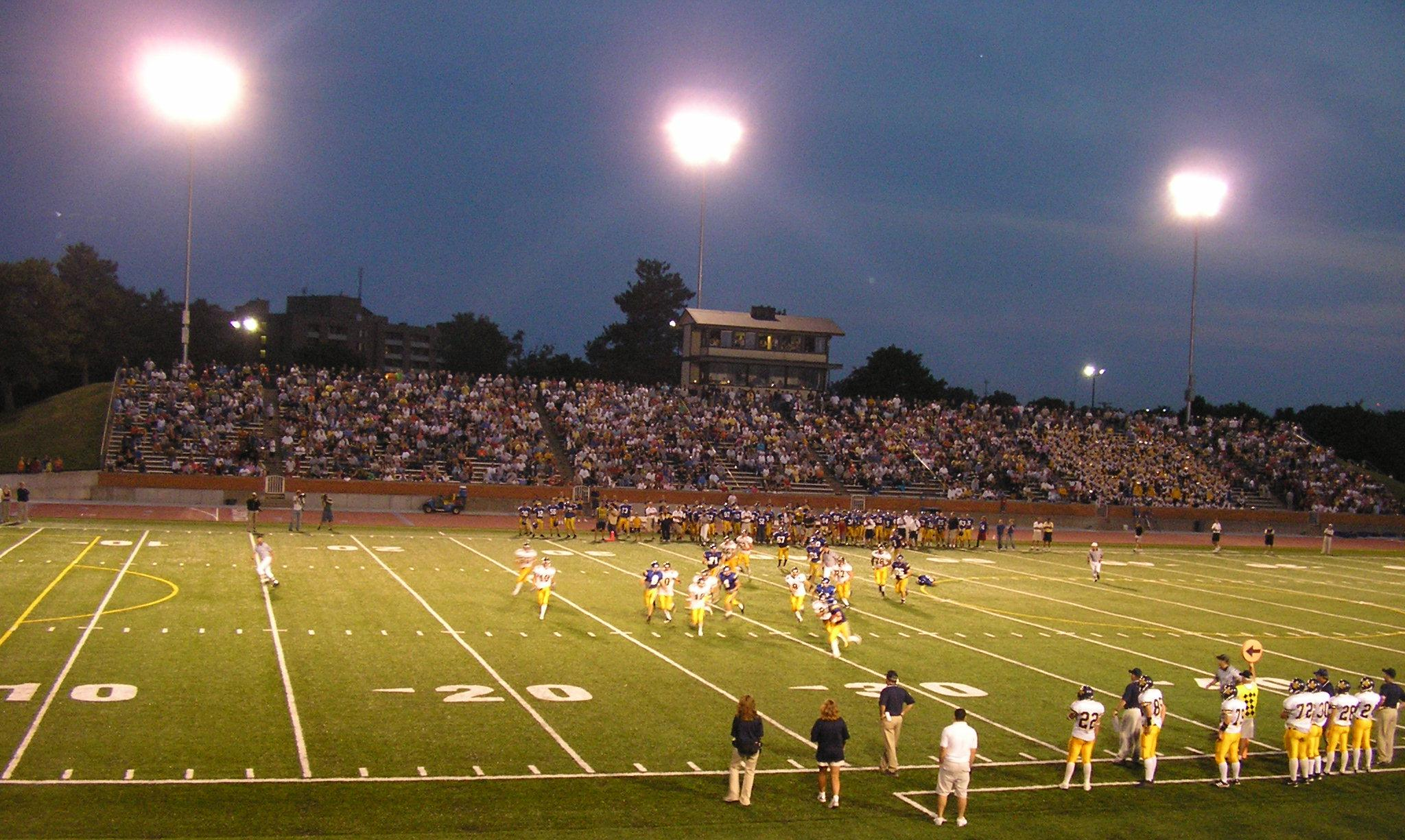
Midland Community Stadium
