= Midland High School (Midland, Michigan) =

Public high school in Michigan, United States

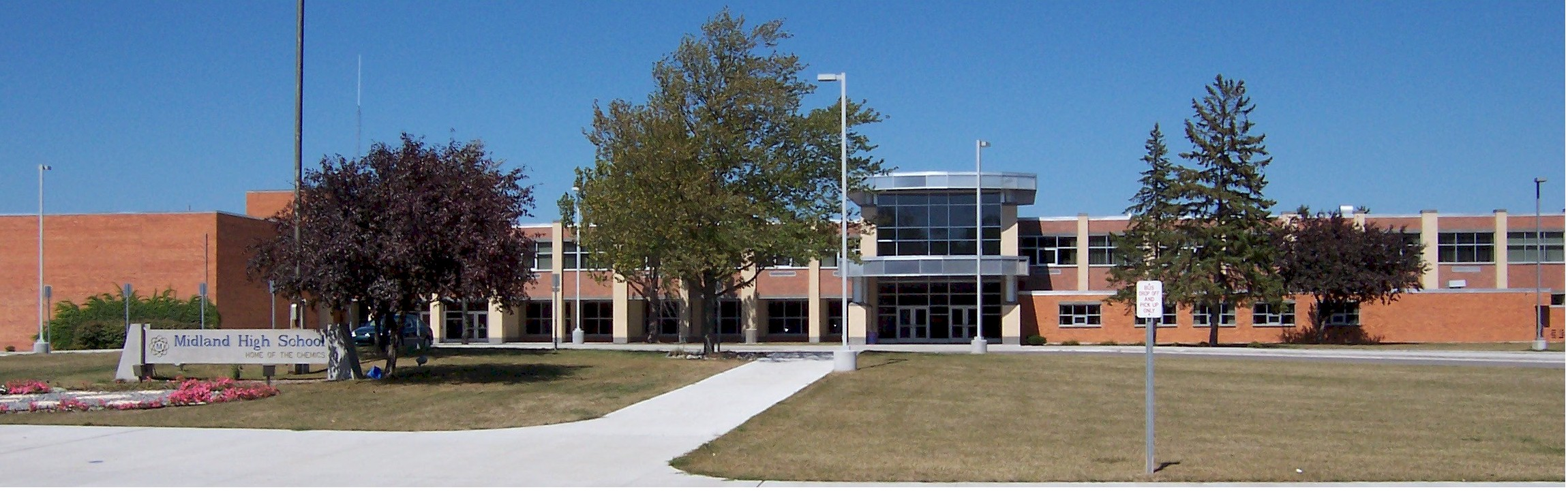

Location
- 1301 Eastlawn Drive, Midland, Michigan 48642; United States; 43°37′14″N 84°12′45″W

Information
- School type: Public, magnet middle school and high school
- Established: 1872
- School district: Midland Public Schools
- Superintendent: Penny Miller-Nelson
- CEEB code: 232585
- NCES School ID: 262382006060
- Principal: Tiela Schurman
- Teaching staff: 63.30 (on an FTE basis)
- Grades: 9–12
- Gender: Co-ed
- Enrollment: 1,134 (2023–2024)
- Student to teacher ratio: 17.91
- Campus size: 25 acres (10 ha)
- Campus type: Suburban
- Colors: Blue and gold
- Athletics conference: Saginaw Valley League, MHSAA
- Nickname: Chemics
- Rival: H.H. Dow High School
- Newspaper: Focus
- Yearbook: Chemic
- Feeder schools: Northeast Middle School
- Website: mhs.midlandps.org

Student assessments
- 2021–22 school year Change vs. prior year

M-STEP 11th grade proficiency rates (Science / Social Studies)
- Advanced %: 15.7 / 26.4
- Proficient %: 29.5 / 36.6
- PR. Proficient %: 17.7 / –
- Not Proficient %: 37.0 / ≤5

Average test scores
- SAT Total: 1038.3 (▲ +13.4)

Midland High School is a public, magnet high school located in Midland, Michigan. It is the older of two high schools in the Midland Public Schools district, and a member of the Saginaw Valley High School Association.

== Academics ==
=== IB Diploma ===
Midland participate in the International Baccalaureate Diploma Programme.

== Athletics ==
The Chemics currently compete in the Saginaw Valley League.

Midland High School Gymnasium was used as the home arena by the Flint Dow A.C.'s professional basketball team during the 1947–48 season. They played in the National Basketball League, the major pro league of the era before it merged with the BAA to form the modern NBA.

== Demographics ==
The demographic breakdown of the 1,156 students enrolled in 2022-23 was:

- White – 85.6%
- Hispanic – 6.0%
- Black – 2.7%
- American Indian/Alaska Native – 0.5%
- Asian – 1.1%
- Native Hawaiian/Pacific Islander – 0.3%
- Two or More Races – 3.8%

—

- Male – 49.7%
- Female – 50.3%

35.29% of the students were eligible for free or reduced-cost lunch.

== Notable alumni ==
- John Bartos, Midland entrepreneur, civic leader, philanthropist
- Terry Collins, MLB manager (New York Mets, Anaheim Angels, Houston Astros)
- Alden B. Dow (1904–1983), architect
- Paul Emmel, MLB umpire
- Cathy Guisewite, (born 1950) cartoonist who created the comic strip Cathy in 1976
- Larry Jaster, former MLB player (St. Louis Cardinals, Montreal Expos, Atlanta Braves)
- Jim Kern, former MLB pitcher (Cleveland Indians, Milwaukee Brewers)
- Kevin Mahar, former MLB player (minor league of the Texas Rangers)
- Andrew Maxwell, football player for Michigan State University
- Howard Mudd, (died 2020) 3-time Pro Bowl offensive guard for the San Francisco 49ers; long-time NFL assistant coach
- Karim Sadjadpour, policy analyst
- Andrew Wylie (Class of 2012), two time Super Bowl winning offensive tackle with the Kansas City Chiefs and current offensive tackle for the Washington Commanders
