= Herbert Henry Dow High School =

Location
- 3901 North Saginaw Road; Midland, Michigan 48640; United States; 43°38′23.41″N 84°16′31.61″W

Information
- Type: Public high school
- Established: 1968
- School district: Midland Public Schools
- CEEB code: 232585
- NCES School ID: 262382006068
- Principal: Scott Cochran
- Teaching staff: 71.01 (on an FTE basis)
- Grades: 9–12
- Gender: Co-ed
- Enrollment: 1,272 (2024–2025)
- Student to teacher ratio: 17.91
- Campus size: 67.140 acres (27.171 ha)
- Campus type: Suburban
- Colors: Green and gold
- Fight song: Across the Field
- Athletics conference: Saginaw Valley League, MHSAA
- Nickname: Chargers
- Rival: Midland High School
- Accreditation: North Central Association of Colleges and Schools
- Newspaper: Update (Newspaper); Bolt Media (Electronic)
- Yearbook: The Charger
- Feeder schools: Jefferson Middle School
- Website: dhs.midlandps.org

Herbert Henry Dow High School (H.H. Dow High School) is a public high school located in Midland, Michigan, United States. The school, a part of Midland Public Schools, is a National Blue Ribbon School of Excellence and in 2008 was named one of the top 20 High Schools in Michigan in a study commissioned by U.S. News & World Report.

== History ==
The facility, also known as H.H. Dow High School, Dow High or Midland Dow is one of two high schools in the Midland Public School district, and a member of the Saginaw Valley High School Association. The facility was intended to alleviate overcrowding at Midland High School and construction of the 270,000-square-foot (25,000 m^{2}) building was completed in 1968 at a cost of $9,172,303. The school was named in honor of Herbert Henry Dow, founder of the Dow Chemical Company, based in Midland. When the school opened in 1968, only sophomores were in attendance, and they would be the first class to graduate in 1971. One grade was added each year and the school included grades 10–12 until a freshman class was added in 1997. A$2.2 million science wing with 4,800 square feet (450 m^{2}) was added in 1999. Music and athletic facilities were enhanced in 2005 as part of a 25,000-square-foot (2,300 m^{2}) building expansion which cost $3,827,697.

=== Shooting ===
On March 7, 2007, 17-year-old David Turner shot his ex-girlfriend Jessica Forsyth multiple times near the school cafeteria before committing suicide. Turner was not a student at the school, and had trespassed onto the building to get to Forsyth.

It was later stated that she had only survived due to Turner's bullet being stopped by a 6-inch titanium plate implanted into her collarbone due to previous medical issues. At the time of the shooting, Forsyth was four months pregnant with Turner's child, which she named Gabriella.

== Academics ==
Student assessments
- 2021–22 school year Change vs. prior year

M-STEP 11th grade proficiency rates (Science / Social Studies)
- Advanced %: 16.1 / 26.5
- Proficient %: 26.9 / 31.5
- PR. Proficient %: 9.7 / 35.1
- Not Proficient %: 47.3 / 6.8

Average test scores
- SAT Total: 1111.3 (▼ −6.1)

Dow High School has been accredited by the North Central Association of Colleges and Schools every year since 1972. According to the 2016 school improvement plan, there were 85 staff and faculty members. Nearly two-thirds of the instructors held a master's degree or higher and all were "highly qualified" for their teaching assignments. The school was ranked as the 47th best high school in Michigan for 2021 by U.S. News & World Report. Advanced Placement classes are used by 32% of the students. Students also have the option to participate in the International Baccalaureate Diploma Programme.

== Athletics ==
Dow High School fields teams for cross country, football, soccer, golf, swimming, tennis, volleyball, basketball, bowling, cheerleading, pom, hockey, wrestling, baseball, lacrosse, softball, track and gymnastics. The school's athletic teams compete in the Saginaw Valley League, MHSAA.

=== Cross Country ===
Victoria Garces won the girls individual Division 1 state championship on November 2, 2024 in 16:37.1, the second-fastest girl's time at the venue, Michigan International Speedway. Garces also held Dow's school record.

=== Football ===
The 1976 team won the school's only state championship with an undefeated 11-0 season including a 20-2 victory over Midland High School. The state final was played in the (then) new Pontiac Silverdome against Harrison High School from Farmington Hills. Dow won, 36-27 under coach Al Quick, who was named Michigan High School Football Coach of the Year for 1976.

=== Hockey ===
The Dow High School Hockey team captured the school's first hockey state championship on Saturday, March 12, 2022, defeating Orchard Lake St. Mary's in the finals by a score of 2–0.

=== Tennis ===
The Dow High School Tennis team won their 7th tennis state championship on Saturday, October 15, 2022, besting the field of 20 teams and finishing with 32 points. The team was coached by Terry Schwartzkopf, the recipient of the 2017-18 NFHS National Boys Tennis Coach of the Year.

== Activities ==
The school offers more than 55 co-curricular clubs and activities open to students depending on level of interest, including student government, Model United Nations, debate, quiz bowl, mathematics competitions, community service, and language clubs. Diversity includes Dear Asian Youth, Black Student Alliance, Muslim Student Alliance, Indian Alliance. Culture clubs include Korean & Japanese Clubs. Music choices include band, marching band, orchestra, choir, jazz ensembles, chamber music groups, and solo. Drama activities include all facets of a theatre production. Art starts with beginning art, intermediate art, advanced 2D design, advanced 3D design, commercial art and IB/AP Visual Art.

Approximately 80% of the student body is involved in co-curricular activities.

== Demographics ==
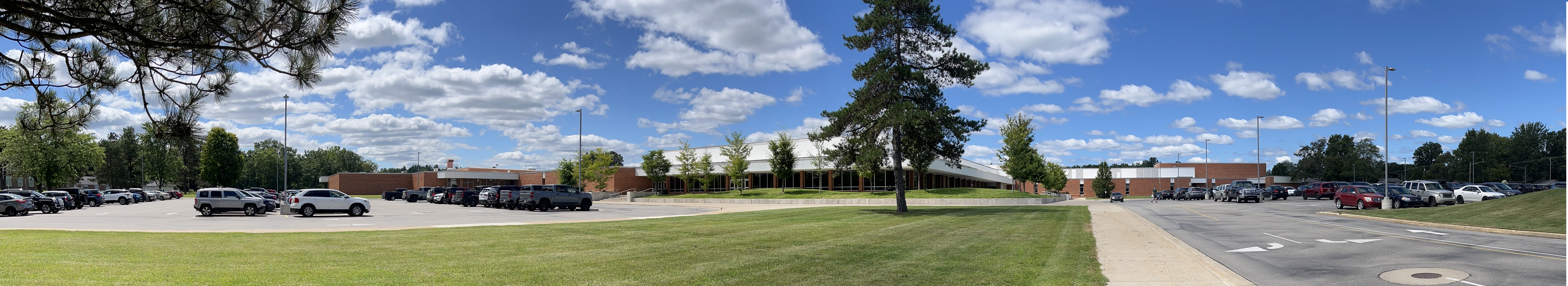
Panoramic view from the NE

The demographic breakdown of the 1,268 students enrolled in 2022-23 was:

- White – 83.0%
- Hispanic – 4.5%
- Black – 1.5%
- American Indian/Alaska Native – 0.2%
- Asian – 7.3%
- Native Hawaiian/Pacific Islander – <0.1%
- Two or More Races – 3.4%

—

- Male – 47.9%
- Female – 52.1%

21.2% of the students were eligible for free or reduced-cost lunch.

The 2016 school improvement plan states that Dow Chemical Company is the major area employer and has been downsizing since 2012, resulting in a decrease of 160 students. The merger of Dow Corning and DuPont is expected to exacerbate the situation. The number of suspensions and total students suspended was halved from the 2011–12 school year (156/89) to the 2015–16 school year (65/45).

== Notable alumni ==
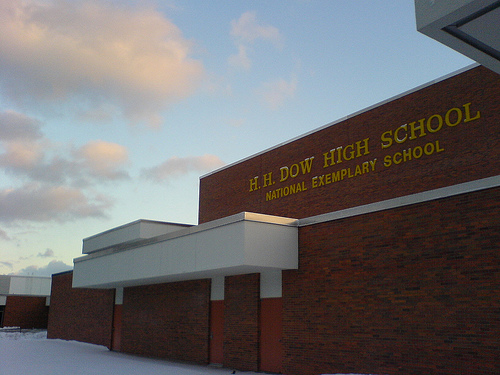
North side of school

- David Lee Camp, member of the United States House of Representatives
- Michael Cohrs, Group Executive Committee Deutsche Bank
- Molly Davis, college basketball player and coach
- Meredith McGrath, former professional tennis player on the Women's Tennis Association
- Chuck Moss, member of the Michigan House of Representatives
- Joseph P. Overton, creator of the Overton Window
- Jalen Parmele, NFL running back
- Bill Schuette, District Court of Appeals Judge, former member of the United States House of Representatives and Attorney General of the State of Michigan
- Steve Shelley, drummer for the band Sonic Youth
- Cheryl Studer, Grammy Award winning dramatic soprano
- Scott Winchester, former MLB pitcher for the Cincinnati Reds
