= Jalen Parmele =

American football player (born 1985)

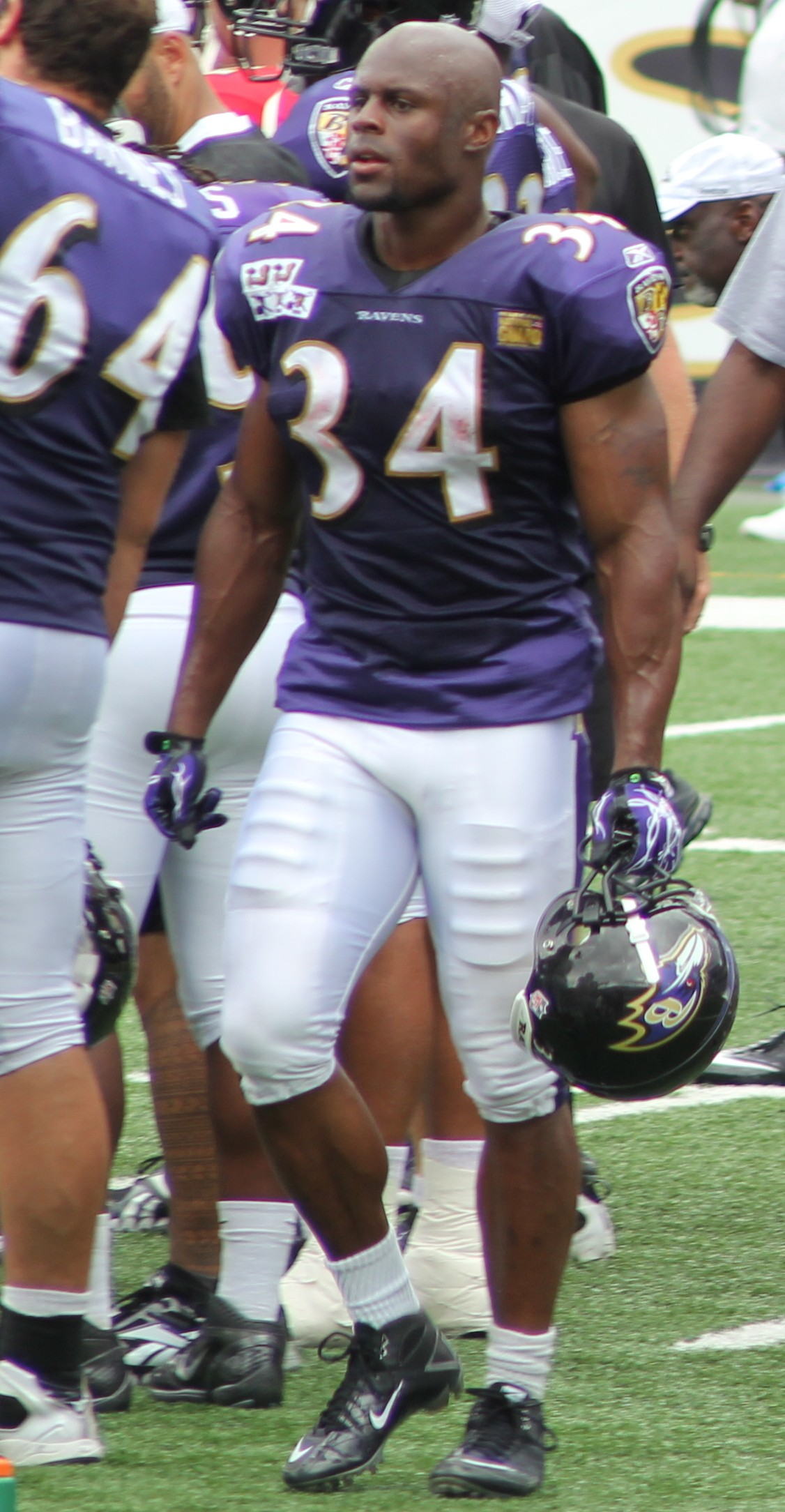
- Parmele (#34) at practice during his time with the Ravens

No. 34, 38
- Position: Running back / Kickoff returner

Personal information
- Born: December 30, 1985 (age 40); Boynton Beach, Florida, U.S.
- Listed height: 6 ft 0 in (1.83 m)
- Listed weight: 224 lb (102 kg)

Career information
- High school: Dow (Midland, Michigan)
- College: Toledo
- NFL draft: 2008: 6th round, 176th overall pick

Career history
- Miami Dolphins (2008); Baltimore Ravens (2008–2010); Jacksonville Jaguars (2012); Tennessee Titans (2013)*; Arizona Cardinals (2014); Cleveland Browns (2015)*
- * Offseason or practice squad member only

Awards and highlights
- 2× First-team All-MAC (2006, 2007)

Career NFL statistics
- Rushing attempts: 48
- Rushing yards: 187
- Receptions: 7
- Receiving yards: 60
- Stats at Pro Football Reference

Justin Alexander "Jalen" Parmele (born December 30, 1985) is an American former professional football player who was a running back in the National Football League (NFL). He was selected by the Miami Dolphins in the sixth round of the 2008 NFL draft. He was also a member of the Baltimore Ravens, Jacksonville Jaguars, Tennessee Titans, Arizona Cardinals, and Cleveland Browns. He played college football for the Toledo Rockets. Jalen is now the owner of Parmele Post Rehab Exercise and Massage in Gilbert, Arizona.

== Early life ==
Parmele attended and played high school football for H. H. Dow High School in Midland, Michigan. He rushed for 705 yards as a sophomore, 1,253 yards as a junior, and 1,507 yards and 23 touchdowns as a senior. For his performance as a senior, Parmele was named team MVP as well as a first-team all-state selection. He was also selected to the league's all-academic team three years.

In addition to football, he lettered in track and basketball.

== College career ==
Parmele went on to attend the University of Toledo. He also received scholarship offers from Florida A&M, Western Michigan, and Eastern Michigan.

As a freshman in 2004, he rushed for 183 yards and three touchdowns in nine games. He appeared in 11 games the following season, rushing for 294 yards and three touchdowns.

Parmele broke out as a junior in 2006, rushing for 1,170 yards and eight touchdowns on his way to a first-team All-MAC selection. He also caught 16 passes for 128 yards on the season. His rushing total ranked third in the conference behind only Northern Illinois' Garrett Wolfe and Ohio's Kalvin McRae. He set a career-high with 173 rushing yards against Ball State, and his 92-yard run in that game was the second-longest in school history.

In 12 starts as a senior in 2007, Parmele rushed for a career-high 1,511 yards and 14 touchdowns on the way to his second consecutive first-team All-MAC selection. His rushing total that season ranked ninth in the nation and second in the conference behind only Kent State's Eugene Jarvis. He also caught 17 passes for 157 yards (both personal bests) and the only receiving touchdown of his collegiate career. He surpassed his previous career high with 241 rushing yards in a game against Ohio.

Parmele concluded his four-year collegiate career with 3,119 rushing yards on 589 carries (5.3 avg.) and 28 touchdowns.

=== Statistics ===
Career statistics
		Rushing					Receiving				
Year	G	Att	Yds	TD	Lng	Avg.	Rec.	Yds	TD	Lng	Avg.
2004	9	42	183	3	21	4.4	4	24	0	15	6.0
2005	11	64	294	3	26	4.6	4	41	0	17	10.3
2006	12	207	1,131	8	92	5.5	16	128	0	25	8.0
2007	12	276	1,511	14	54	5.5	17	157	1	28	9.2
Total	44	589	3,119	28	92	5.3	41	350	1	28	8.5

== Professional career ==
Pre-draft measurables
Height	Weight	40-yard dash	10-yard split	20-yard split	20-yard shuttle	Three-cone drill	Vertical jump	Broad jump	Bench press
5 ft 11 1/2 in (1.82 m)	224 lb (102 kg)	4.47 s	1.48 s	2.54 s	4.29 s	6.96 s	34 in (0.86 m)	10 ft 5 in (3.18 m)	19 reps
All values from NFL Combine

=== Pre-draft ===
Prior to the 2008 NFL draft, Parmele participated in the NFL Scouting Combine and posted a 4.47-second 40-yard dash. At his Pro Day on February 28, he measured in at 5 ft 11 3/8 in (1.813 m) and 226 lb (103 kg). He ran the short shuttle in 4.44 seconds, short cone drill in 6.95 second, and had a 41 1/2 in (1,050 mm) vertical leap. On April 15, Parmele met with the Miami Dolphins for a pre-draft visit.

=== Miami Dolphins ===
Parmele was selected by the Miami Dolphins in the sixth round (176th overall) of the 2008 NFL draft. The pick used to select Parmele was acquired from the Detroit Lions. Shortly after the draft, Dolphins general manager Jeff Ireland labeled Parmele the third running back on the depth chart and said he would also be a given a chance to return kickoffs. During June workouts, Parmele worked with the second-team offense and also returned punts.

After spending the first three games of the 2008 regular season inactive, Parmele was waived by the Dolphins on September 24 to make room for tight end Joey Haynos on the roster. Parmele was re-signed to the team's practice squad the following day.

=== Baltimore Ravens ===
Parmele was signed by the Baltimore Ravens off the Dolphins' practice squad on December 9, 2008. He made his NFL debut against the Jacksonville Jaguars in the regular season finale on December 28, rushing twice for 27 yards.

In his second season with the Ravens in 2009, he made a much bigger impact as he became the team's starting kick returner after rookie Lardarius Webb tore his ACL in Week 15. On only nine kick-off returns, Parmele racked up 283 yards for a 31.4 average with his longest return being 53 yards. He also added five carries for 17 yards as the team's #4 runningback and six special teams tackles.

In 2010, Parmele did not rush once but continued his role as a backup returner.

Parmele was released by the Ravens during final cuts on September 3, 2011.

=== Jacksonville Jaguars ===
Parmele was signed by the Jacksonville Jaguars on May 1, 2012. He began the season as a special teams player, including returning kicks. When Maurice Jones-Drew and two other running backs were injured, Parmele became the starting running back. He played in the Jaguars first 11 games before incurring a partially torn groin on November 27. Parmele was placed on injured reserve and surgery ended his season with 40 carries for 143 yards, 3.6 yards per carry. He caught seven passes for 60 yards, for 8.6 yards per catch, and returned 10 kicks for 233 yards, a 23.3 yard average.

He became a free agent in 2013.

=== Tennessee Titans ===
Parmele signed with the Tennessee Titans on May 8, 2013. He was released by the team on August 30, 2013.

=== Arizona Cardinals ===
On May 27, 2014, Parmele signed with the Arizona Cardinals. He appeared in a Week 3 game for the Cardinals. He was released by the team on September 24, 2014.

=== Cleveland Browns ===
Parmele was signed by the Cleveland Browns on August 3, 2015. On August 31, 2015, he was released by the team.
