= Davison High School (Michigan) =

Location
- 1250 North Oak Road; Davison, Michigan 48423; United States; 43°01′29″N 83°30′12″W

Information
- Type: Public secondary school
- School district: Davison Community Schools
- Superintendent: Matt Lobban
- Principal: Jerry Piger
- Teaching staff: 93.73 (FTE)
- Grades: 9-12
- Enrollment: 1,623 (2024-2025)
- Student to teacher ratio: 17.32
- Colors: Maroon and gold
- Athletics conference: Saginaw Valley League
- Nickname: Cardinals
- Accreditation: AdvancED
- Website: dhs.davisonschools.org

Davison High School is a public secondary school in Davison, Michigan, United States. It serves grades 9-12 for Davison Community Schools. Notable alumni include filmmaker Michael Moore, Olympian Ken Morrow (hockey), and NHL goaltender Tim Thomas.

== Demographics ==
The demographic breakdown of the 1,646 students enrolled in 2024-25 was:

- Male - 831
- Female - 792
- Native American/Alaskan - 4
- Asian - 13
- Black - 72
- Hispanic - 113
- Native Hawaiian/Pacific islanders - 2
- White - 1318
- Multiracial - 101

34.5% of the students were eligible for free lunch.

== Athletics ==
Davison's Cardinals compete in the Saginaw Valley League. School colors are maroon and gold. The following Michigan High School Athletic Association (MHSAA) sanctioned sports are offered:

- Baseball (boys)
- Basketball (girls and boys)
- Bowling (girls and boys)
  - Girls state champion - 2012, 2013, 2014, 2016, 2017
- Competitive cheerleading (girls)
- Cross country (girls and boys)
- Football (boys)
  - State champion - 2019
- Golf (girls and boys)
- Ice hockey (boys)
- Lacrosse (girls and boys)
- Soccer (girls and boys)
- Softball (girls)
- Swim and dive (girls and boys)
- Tennis (girls and boys)
- Track and field (girls and boys)
- Volleyball (girls)
- Wrestling (boys)
  - State champion - 1980, 1981, 2000, 2002, 2003, 2004, 2005, 2006, 2021
