= Davison, Michigan =

- City
- City of Davison
- Nickname: City of Flags
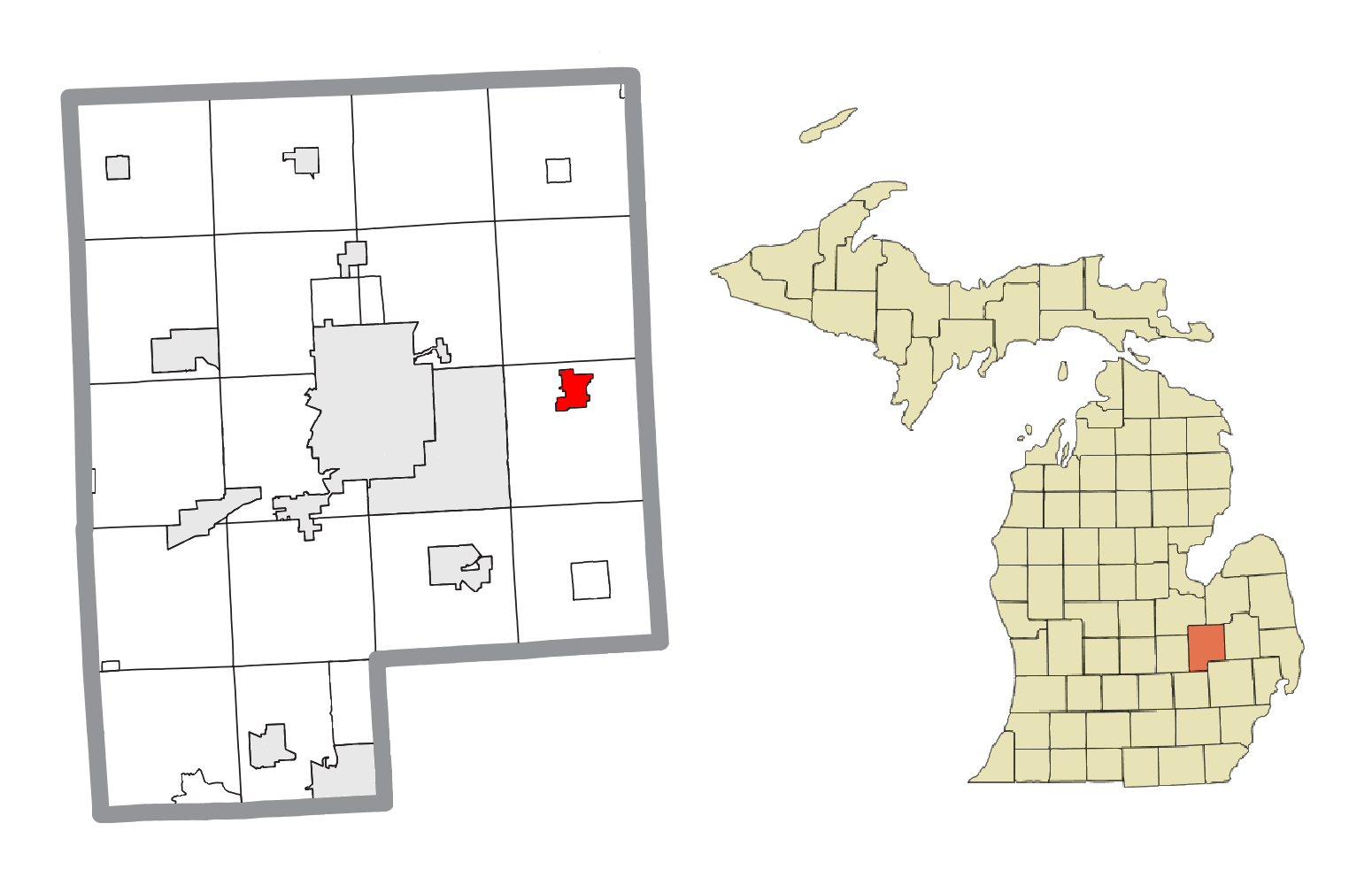
- Location within Genesee County

- Location within the state of Michigan
- Coordinates: 43°01′52″N 83°31′01″W
- Country: United States
- State: Michigan
- County: Genesee
- Incorporated: 1889 (village); 1938 (city)

Government
  - Type: Council–manager
  - Mayor: Stacy Kalisz
  - City manager: Andrea Schroeder

Area
  - Total: 1.98 sq mi (5.14 km^{2})
  - Land: 1.98 sq mi (5.14 km^{2})
  - Water: 0 sq mi (0.00 km^{2})
- Elevation: 794 ft (242 m)

Population (2020)
  - Total: 5,143
  - Density: 2,589/sq mi (999.7/km^{2})
- Time zone: UTC-5 (Eastern (EST))
  - Summer (DST): UTC-4 (EDT)
- ZIP code(s): 48423
- Area code: 810
- FIPS code: 26-19880
- GNIS feature ID: 0624356
- Website: www.cityofdavisonmi.gov

Davison is a city in Genesee County in the U.S. state of Michigan and a suburb of Flint. As of the 2020 census, Davison had a population of 5,143. Davison is located within Davison Township survey township area (7N 8E), but is administratively autonomous.

Davison was named after Judge Norman Davison, a judge of Lapeer County and a delegate to state constitution convention of 1835. He resided in a nearby hamlet formerly known as Davisonville, now known as Atlas.

== History ==
=== Davison Station ===
Township section 3, 9 and 10 was Davison Station, which was first settled in 1842 by Eleazer Thurston in section 10. The line of the Chicago and Lake Huron Railroad (now Canadian National Railway) through the settlement was finished in 1871 marked the beginning of Davison Station. The first saw mill in the township was also built here that year by Dunn and Darling. The township and the settlement had in 1872 a number of firsts: doctor, L. W. Hanson, merchant Damon Stewart and tavern owned and operated by Henry S. Rising. On April 10, 1872, Davison Station post office open with Stewart as the postmaster. The Free Will Baptist Church, formed in 1859 at and hosted at Herrick Schoolhouse two miles away, moved to a frame church building in the village in 1872.

In 1873, a cheese factory and flouring mill opened. The Davison Station post office was renamed to just Davison on June 30, 1893.

=== Davison Village ===
Davison was incorporated as a village on May 20, 1889. On April 30, 1894, part of downtown, dubbed the Rotten Row, caught fire and wiped the section out. By 1895, the village had a Rosemoor Park with a race track used for horse then add cars. In 1916, the village had an auditorium, a state bank, Masonic and Odd Fellows lodges, four churches, the Catholic, the Methodist Episcopal, the Free Methodist and the Baptist. The estimated population was 700. Rosemoor Park began in 1919 hold the county fair every year except one until 1938.

=== Davison City ===
Davison separated itself from Davison Township by incorporating as a city on December 5, 1938. In 1943, Rosemoor Park closed permanently. The track's owner in 1946 developed a subdivision on the track property.

In January 2010, it was announced that Davison City Manager Dale Martin and Davison Township, Michigan Supervisor Kurt Soper had begun preliminary meetings discussing the possibility of merging the two municipalities.

== Geography ==
According to the United States Census Bureau, the city has a total area of 1.98 square miles (5.13 km^{2}), all land.

== Demographics ==
Historical population
Census	Pop.	Note	%±
1880	163		—
1890	456		179.8%
1900	751		64.7%
1910	673		−10.4%
1920	811		20.5%
1930	1,298		60.0%
1940	1,397		7.6%
1950	1,745		24.9%
1960	3,761		115.5%
1970	5,259		39.8%
1980	6,087		15.7%
1990	5,693		−6.5%
2000	5,536		−2.8%
2010	5,173		−6.6%
2020	5,143		−0.6%
Source: Census Bureau. 2000, 1960-1990

=== 2020 census ===
As of the 2020 census, Davison had a population of 5,143. The median age was 41.5 years. 20.6% of residents were under the age of 18 and 20.5% of residents were 65 years of age or older. For every 100 females there were 85.3 males, and for every 100 females age 18 and over there were 83.0 males age 18 and over.

100.0% of residents lived in urban areas, while 0.0% lived in rural areas.

There were 2,470 households in Davison, of which 26.2% had children under the age of 18 living in them. Of all households, 33.8% were married-couple households, 21.7% were households with a male householder and no spouse or partner present, and 37.4% were households with a female householder and no spouse or partner present. About 41.7% of all households were made up of individuals and 18.9% had someone living alone who was 65 years of age or older.

There were 2,610 housing units, of which 5.4% were vacant. The homeowner vacancy rate was 1.2% and the rental vacancy rate was 6.0%.

Racial composition as of the 2020 census
Race	Number	Percent
White	4,598	89.4%
Black or African American	103	2.0%
American Indian and Alaska Native	26	0.5%
Asian	28	0.5%
Native Hawaiian and Other Pacific Islander	5	0.1%
Some other race	44	0.9%
Two or more races	339	6.6%
Hispanic or Latino (of any race)	236	4.6%

=== 2010 census ===
As of the census of 2010, there were 5,173 people, 2,371 households, and 1,314 families residing in the city. The population density was 2,617.9 per square mile. The racial makeup of the city was 94.9% White, 1.8% African American, 0.3% Native American, 0.3% Asian, 0% Pacific Islander, 0.7% from other races, and 2% from two or more races. Hispanic or Latino of any race were 2.9% of the population.

The 2010 census lists 2,371 households, out of which 640 (27%) had children under the age of 18 living with them, 837 (35.3%) were married couples living together, 349 (14.7%) had a female householder with no husband present, and 1,057 (44.6%) were non-families. 936 (39.5%) of all households were made up of individuals, and 492 (18.1%) had someone living alone who was 65 years of age or older. The average household size was 2.18 and the average family size was 2.91. In the city, the population was spread out, with 25.8% aged birth to 19, 12.1% from 20 to 29, 12.6% from 30 to 39, 13.1% from 40 to 49, 13% 50 to 59, 11.1% from 60 to 69, and 12.1% who were 70 years of age or older. The median age was 39.5 years.

=== Income and poverty ===
According to the American Community Survey, 2010, The median income for a household in the city was $37,793, and the mean income for a household was $48,643. The per capita income for the city was $23,132. About 14.5% of families and 17.5% of the city population were below the poverty line, with 26.6% of those being under age 18 and 5.2% of those age 65 or over.

== Government ==
The municipality operates its own well water system.

The city has a council-manager government, with the position of city manager currently being held by Andrea Schroeder. The Davison City Council is composed of 7 members, including the mayor. The Mayor of Davison, a position currently held by Stacey Kalisz, is mostly titular, with most of the executive power being vested in the city manager.

City Council Members

Name	Title
Stacey Kalisz	Mayor
David Perry	Mayor Pro Tem
Benjamin Lindstrom	Councilman
Eric Daly	Councilman
Angela Burton	Councilwoman
Robin Ballard	Councilwoman
Brenden Hynes	Councilman

== Notable people ==
- Kathleen Flinn, New York Times bestselling author. Her memoir, Burnt Toast Makes You Sing Good about her life growing up in Davison was named a 2015 Michigan Notable Book by the Library of Michigan.
- Thomas C. Hart, a U.S. Navy admiral and Asiatic Fleet commander during World War II
- Michael Moore, Academy Award-winning filmmaker, was born in 1954 at St. Joseph's Hospital in Flint, Michigan, spent most of his childhood in Davison, and graduated from Davison High School in 1972.
- Ken Morrow, professional ice hockey defenseman and Stanley Cup winner who played in the 1980 Miracle on Ice game was raised in Davison.
- John Sinclair, poet, human rights activist, manager of the MC5, and founder of the anti-racist White Panther Party was raised in Davison.
- Tim Thomas, NHL goalie
