= List of linguistics conferences =

This is a list of recurring linguistics conferences. Included are also a list of organisations that hold recurring meetings under the same name.

== By geographical location ==
=== International ===
- Association for Laboratory Phonology (LabPhon)
- Formal Approaches to Slavic Linguistics (FASL)
- International Conference on Sociolinguistics
- International Congress of Linguists (ICL)
- International Society for the Linguistics of English (ISLE)
- Southeast Asian Linguistics Society (SEALS)

=== North America ===
- American Dialect Society (ADS)
- Canadian Linguistic Association (CLA)
- Chicago Linguistic Society (CLS)
- Linguistic Society of America (LSA)
- North American Conference on Chinese Linguistics (NACCL)
- West Coast Conference on Formal Linguistics (WCCFL)
- Western Conference on Linguistics
- Penn Linguistics Conference (PLC)
- Workshop on Structure and Constituency in Languages of the Americas (WSCLA)

=== South America ===
- Associação Brasileira de Linguística (ABRALIN)
- Society for Caribbean Linguistics (SCL)
- Latin American Systemic Functional Linguistics Association (ALSFAL)

=== Europe ===
- Conference on Mediterranean and European Linguistic Anthropology (COMELA)
- Days of Swiss Linguistics (DSL)
- Generative Linguistics in the Old World (GLOW)
- International Conference on Sociolinguistics (ICS)
- International ESP Conference
- Linguistic Intersections of Language and Gender Conference (LILG)
- Moscow Student Conference on Linguistics (MSCL)
- Annual Meeting of the Societas Linguistica Europaea (SLE)

=== Asia ===
- Conference on Asian Linguistic Anthropology (CALA)
- GLOW in Asia

=== Africa ===
- West African Linguistic Society (WALS)
- African Assembly on Linguistic Anthropology (AFALA)
- Tunisian Systemic Functional Linguistics Conference (TSFLC)

=== Australia ===
- Australian Linguistic Society (ALS)
- Applied Linguistics Association of Australia (ALAA)

== By core area ==
=== Phonetics ===
- Acoustical Society of America (ASA) Meetings
- Association for Laboratory Phonology Meetings (LabPhon)
- Interspeech
- International Congress of Phonetic Sciences (ICPhS)
- Phonetics Day, Dutch Association for Phonetic Sciences (DvdF)

=== Phonology ===
- Annual Meeting on Phonology (AMP)
- Association for Laboratory Phonology (LabPhon)
- Manchester Phonology Meeting (MFM)
- Old-World Conference in Phonology (OCP)
- International Conference on Tone and Intonation (TAI)

=== Morphology ===
- American International Morphology Meeting (AIMM)

=== Syntax ===
- Dependency Linguistics (Depling)
- Comparative Germanic Syntax Workshop (CGSW)

=== Semantics ===
- Sinn und Bedeutung
- Semantics and Linguistic Theory (SALT)

=== Core theory (all of the above) ===
- North East Linguistics Society (NELS)
- Generative Linguistics in the Old World (GLOW)
- West Coast Conference on Formal Linguistics (WCCFL)
- Canadian Linguistic Association (CLA)
- Chicago Linguistic Society (CLS)
- Moscow Student Conference on Linguistics (MSCL)
- Western Conference on Linguistics
- Syntax, Phonology and Language Analysis (SinFonIJA)

== By sub-field ==
=== Multilingualism ===
- International Symposium on Bilingualism (ISB)
- International Conference on Enclave Languages/Linguistic Islands
- International Workshop on Multilingualism in Learner Corpus Research (MLCR)
- International Symposium on Monolingual and Bilingual Speech (ISMBS)

=== Psycholinguistics ===
- Annual Conference on Human Sentence Processing (HSP)
- International Conference on the Processing of East Asian Languages (ICPEAL)

=== Cognitive linguistics ===
- International Cognitive Linguistics Conference

=== Documentary linguistics ===
- Workshop on the Use of Computational Methods in the Study of Endangered Languages (ComputEL)
- International Conference on Language Documentation and Conservation (ICLDC)

=== Sociolinguistics and variation ===
- International Gender and Language Association (IGALA)
- International Conference on Sociolinguistics (ICS)
- New Ways of Analyzing Variation (NWAV)

=== Second language acquisition ===
- European Association for the Teaching of Academic Writing
- Generative Approaches to Language Acquisition (GALA)
- Generative Approaches to Second Language Acquisition Conference (GASLA)
- Generative Approaches to Language Acquisition - North America (GALANA)
- Boston University Conference on Language Development (BUCLD)
- European Second Language Association (EuroSLA)
- Annual Conference of the Japan Second Language Association (J-SLA)
- Congress of the International Association for the Study of Child Language (IASCL)
- Symposium on Second Language Writing
- International ESP Conference
- Experimental SLA: Connecting Research, Theory, and Language Teaching (ExpSLA)
- International Conference on Native and Non-native Accents of English (Accents)
- International Symposium on the Acquisition of Second Language Speech (New Sounds)

=== Language testing ===
- Language Testing Research Colloquium (LTRC)

=== Corpus linguistics ===
- International Corpus Linguistics Conference
- International Workshop on Multilingualism in Learner Corpus Research (MLCR)

=== Computational linguistics ===
- Annual Meeting of the Association for Computational Linguistics (ACL)
- International Conference on Language Resources and Evaluation (LREC)
- International Conference on Intelligent Text Processing and Computational Linguistics (CICLing)
- International Conference on Computational Linguistics (COLING)
- Workshop on Natural Language Processing for Computer-Assisted Language Learning (NLP4CALL)

=== Pragmatics ===
- International Pragmatic Conference (IPC)
- International Conference of the American Pragmatics Association (AMPRA)

=== Onomastics ===
- Congress of the International Council of Onomastic Sciences
- Mainzer Namentagung
- American Name Society Annual Conference
- Kolloquium Namenforschung Schweiz
- Jahrestagung der Gesellschaft für Namenforschung e.V. (GfN)

=== Miscellaneous ===
- Laughter and Non-Verbal Vocalisations Workshop (LW)
- Language Policy Forum (LPF)
- International Conference on Multimodality (ICOM)
- Linguistic Evidence
- European Association for Research on Learning and Instruction (Earli)

== By language family ==
=== Indo-European ===
==== Germanic ====
- Germanic Linguistics Annual Conference (GLAC)
- International Society for the Linguistics of English (isLE)
- Comparative Germanic Syntax Workshop (CGSW)

==== Romance ====
- Hispanic Linguistic Symposium (HLS)
- Linguistic Symposium on Romance Languages (LSRL)
- Going Romance

==== Slavic ====
- Formal Approaches to Slavic Linguistics (FASL)
- Formal Description of Slavic Languages (FDSL)

=== Uralic/Finno-Ugric ===
- International Finno-Ugric Students’ Conference (IFUSCO)
- International Congress for Finno-Ugric Studies (CIFU)

=== Languages of Asia ===
- Southeast Asian Linguistics Society (SEALS)
- Formal Approaches to South Asian Languages (FASAL)
- Theoretical East Asian Linguistics (TEAL)

==== Sino-Tibetan ====
- International Conference on Sino-Tibetan Languages and Linguistics (ICSTLL)
- Himalayan Languages Symposium (HLS)
- International Symposium on Chinese Languages and Linguistics (IsCLL)
- North American Conference on Chinese Linguistics (NACCL)
- North East Indian Linguistics Society (NEILS)

==== Austronesian ====
- International Conference on Austronesian Linguistics (ICAL)
- Austronesian Formal Linguistics Association (AFLA)
- International Symposium on Malay/Indonesian Linguistics (ISMIL)
- International Symposium on the Languages of Java (ISLOJ)
- Conference on Oceanic Linguistics (COOL)

==== Austroasiatic ====
- International Conference on Austroasiatic Linguistics (ICAAL)

==== Papuan ====
- Workshop on the Languages of Papua (WLP)

==== Altaic ====
- Workshop on Altaic Formal Linguistics (WAFL)

==== Dravidian ====
- Formal Approaches to South Asian Languages (FASAL)

=== Languages of Africa ===
- World Congress of African Linguistics (WOCAL)

==== Afro-Asiatic ====
- North Atlantic Conference on Afroasiatic Linguistics (NACAL)
- Annual Conference on African Linguistics (ACAL)

=== Languages of the Americas ===
- Workshop on Structure and Constituency in Languages of the Americas (WSCLA)
- Society for the Study of the Indigenous Languages of the Americas (SSILA)

=== Caribbean languages, including creoles ===
- Society for Caribbean Languages (SCL) 1
