= Eric Schiller =

American chess player and author (1955–2018

- Born: Eric Andrew Schiller; March 20, 1955; New York City, U.S.
- Died: November 3, 2018 (aged 63)

Academic background
- Education: University of Chicago (PhD)
- Thesis: An Autolexical Account of Subordinating Serial Verb Constructions (1991)
- Chess career
- Country: United States
- Title: FIDE Master (2003)
- Peak rating: 2370 (July 1986)

Eric Andrew Schiller (March 20, 1955 – November 3, 2018) was an American chess player and author.

== Early life and education ==
Schiller was born in New York City. He attended Guggenheim Elementary, Sousa Jr. High School and later Paul D. Schreiber High School. He graduated from the University of Chicago 1976, later teaching both there and at Wayne State University. In 1991, he earned his PhD in linguistics from the University of Chicago.

After his undergraduate years, Schiller turned to music performance and founded a music group called the "Long Island Sound Ensemble" and studied conducting in Vienna, Salzburg and Hancock, Maine. He was a frequent attendant at NY Philharmonic rehearsals until 1981.

== Chess career ==
In 1974, Schiller was the Illinois Junior Champion. Schiller played for the University of Chicago team several times at the Pan American Intercollegiate Team Chess Championship. Schiller was the Hawaii action and blitz champion for 1988/89. He was an organizer of the Hawaii International chess festivals 1994–98, including 1998 US Open. As the highest scoring resident of northern California, Schiller won the Northern California (CalChess) Champion state title in 1995. Later that year, he appeared as a chess advisor for the music group Phish on some of the stops for their "Chess Tour" where they played an ongoing game of two chess moves per tour stop and some "band vs. audience" partial games as part of their stage performance. Schiller was an arbiter at several notable games and championships including the FIDE World Chess Championship 2000. While Vladimir Kramnik and Garry Kasparov opted not to participate in the event, they had both endorsed Schiller for this sensitive role during the planning stages.

Schiller was an International Arbiter and International Trainer.

Schiller organized several chess tournaments. He was often a news reporter, reporting on Chess Olympiads and World Chess Championship matches. Schiller was the arbiter for the Staunton Memorial tournament in London in 2005, 2007 and 2008, and the 2006 Gibtelecom International Chess Festival in Gibraltar.

As of July 2017, Schiller's FIDE Elo rating for chess at standard time controls was 1989. At his peak, his rating was 2370.

== Chess author ==
Schiller wrote over 100 chess books, more than any other author of the genre in the 20th century except Fred Reinfeld and Raymond Keene. John L. Watson, who co-wrote three books with Schiller, considers some of Schiller's output to be well suited to its amateur audience. Watson wrote of Complete Defense to King Pawn Openings and Complete Defense to Queen Pawn Openings that "these books are explicitly aimed at the developing student, not the advanced player, and I think they both do a particularly good job of gently guiding an inexperienced player through a new opening. ... While Schiller probably deserves some of the criticism he gets, a consequence of writing too many books too quickly, he should also get credit when he does a good job." International Master Jeremy Silman wrote of Watson and Schiller's The Big Book of Busts, "I am forced to swallow my bigoted view of Schiller's work (or does this just validate my opinion of Watson?) and admit that this is a great book".

Schiller also worked as chess developer mainly developing teaching tools, like all the tutorials for computer software Kasparov's Gambit, chapters of the reference manual of the same game and developing teaching tools included in Chessmaster 5000.

Amongst Schiller's large output, some of his books have received poor reviews. Chess historian Edward Winter has criticized many of Schiller's earlier books for large numbers of spelling, factual and typographical errors, and even claimed plagiarism. Schiller's Unorthodox Chess Openings received a noted two-word review from Tony Miles in Kingpin: "Utter crap." Carsten Hansen wrote of Schiller's book on the Frankenstein–Dracula Variation of the Vienna Game that it was "by far the worst book that I have ever seen."

== Career in linguistics ==
Schiller's PhD thesis was entitled An Autolexical Account of Subordinating Serial Verb Constructions. He was a published author in linguistics, specializing in Mon-Khmer languages. Schiller was a co-founder of the Southeast Asian Linguistic Society and was an officer of the Chicago Linguistic Society. He maintained a web page with a lengthy list of his linguistic publications at this URL.

Books by Schiller on linguistics include:

- Autolexical Theory: Ideas and Methods, Eric Schiller, Elisa Steinberg & Barbara Need (eds.), Mouton de Gruyter, 1995. ISBN 3-11-012626-5.
- The Best of CLS: A selection of out of print papers from 1968 to 1975, Eric Schiller, et al. (eds.), Chicago Linguistic Society, 1988. ISBN 0-914203-29-0.

== Personal life ==
Since 2008, Schiller experienced some health setbacks, including having his right hand and foot amputated due to complications from diabetes. Nonetheless, he remained active and ambulatory with the aid of a walker and taught chess at several elementary schools in and near Mountain View, California, in affiliation with Bay Area Chess, where he lived in the last years of his life. He offered chess tutoring over the Internet via videoconferencing. He died on November 3, 2018, from complications of cardiovascular disease.

== Books on chess ==
- 100 Awesome Chess Moves, Eric Schiller, Cardoza, 2001. ISBN 1-58042-021-4.
- 639 Essential Endgames, Eric Schiller, Cardoza, 1999. ISBN 1-58042-016-8.
- The Aggressive Nimzowitsch Sicilian, Eric Schiller, Chess Digest, 1994. ISBN 0-87568-245-6.
- The Alekhine for the Tournament Player, Lev Alburt & Eric Schiller, Batsford, 1985. ISBN 0-7134-1596-7.
- The Alekhine for the Tournament Player (2nd ed.), Lev Alburt & Eric Schiller, Batsford, 1991. ISBN 0-7134-6951-X.
- Attacking the Castled King, Eric Schiller, The Chess Player, 1986. OCLC 14686051 ASIN B0007B7UDW, ISBN 4871874451.
- Batsford Chess Openings 2, Garry Kasparov and Raymond D. Keene, Henry Holt, 1989. ISBN 0-8050-3409-9.
- The Big Book of Busts, John L. Watson & Eric Schiller, Hypermodern Press, 1995. ISBN 1-886040-13-3.
- The Big Book of Chess, Eric Schiller, Cardoza Publishing, 2006. ISBN 1-58042-133-4.
- The Big Book of Combinations, Eric Schiller, Hypermodern Press, 1995. ISBN 1-886040-14-1.
- Black to Play Classical Defenses and Win, Eric Schiller, Chess Digest, 1993. ISBN 0-87568-219-7.
- Blackmar-Diemer Gambit, Eric Schiller, Chess Enterprises, 1985. ISBN 0-931462-52-5, ISBN 4871874338.
- Blackmar-Diemer Gambit: Bogoljubow Variation, Eric Schiller, Chess Enterprises, 1995. ISBN 0-945470-46-0, ISBN 4871874877.
- Cambridge Springs Defense, Eric Schiller, Chess Enterprises, 1984. ISBN 0-931462-61-4.
- Cambridge Springs Defense: Expanded and Updated Edition, Eric Schiller, Chess Enterprises, 1994. ISBN 0-931462-32-0.
- Caro Kann: 4...Nd7, Leonid Shamkovich & Eric Schiller, Chess Enterprises, 1987. ISBN 0-931462-26-6.
- Catalan, Eric Schiller, Chess Enterprises, 1983. ISBN 0-931462-26-6.
- Catalan (Revised Edition), Eric Schiller, Chess Enterprises, 1988. ISBN 0-931462-75-4.
- Checkmate in One Move, Eric Schiller, Cardoza, 2005. ISBN 1-58042-171-7.
- The Chessplayer's Laboratory Volume 1, Eric Schiller, Hays, 1992. ISBN 0-486-20290-9.
- The Classical Caro-Kann Rejuvenated, Eric Schiller, Chess Enterprises, 1994. ISBN 0-945470-34-7.
- Complete Defense to King Pawn Openings, Eric Schiller, Cardoza, 2003. ISBN 1-58042-109-1.
- Complete Defense to Queen Pawn Openings, Eric Schiller, Cardoza, 1998. ISBN 0-940685-80-9.
- Development of a Chess Master, Eric Schiller, Cardoza, 2000. ISBN 1-58042-050-8.
- The Encyclopedia of Chess Wisdom, Eric Schiller, Cardoza, 1998. ISBN 0-940685-93-0.
- The Encyclopedia of Chess Wisdom, Eric Schiller, Cardoza, 2003. ISBN 1-58042-088-5.
- Fianchetto Against the West Indians, Eric Schiller, Chess Enterprises, 1988. ISBN 0-931462-79-7.
- First Chess Openings, Eric Schiller, Cardoza, 2005. ISBN 1-58042-152-0.
- First Chess Tactics, Eric Schiller, Ishi Press, 2012, ISBN 4871874818.
- Frankenstein-Dracula Variation, Eric Schiller, Chess Enterprises, 1999. ISBN 0-945470-75-4, ISBN 487187446X.
- French Winawer Poisoned Pawn, Eric Schiller, Chess Enterprises, 1988. ISBN 0-931462-74-6.
- Gambit Chess Openings, Eric Schiller, Cardoza, 2002. ISBN 1-58042-057-5.
- Gambit Opening Repertoire for Black, Eric Schiller, Cardoza, 1998. ISBN 0-940685-79-5.
- Gambit Opening Repertoire for White, Eric Schiller, Cardoza, 1998. ISBN 0-940685-78-7.
- Gruenfeld Defense: Russian Variations, Eric Schiller, Chess Enterprises, 1985. ISBN 0-931462-44-4.
- Gruenfeld Defense: Russian Variations (Revised Edition), Eric Schiller, Chess Enterprises, 1988, ISBN 4871874850.
- Handbook of Tricky Opening Strategies, John Watson & Eric Schiller, Hardinge-Simpole, 2004. ISBN 1-84382-149-4.
- How to Play Black against the Staunton Gambit, Eric Schiller & Billy Colias, Chess Digest, 1993. ISBN 0-87568-236-7.
- How to Play the Albin Countergambit, Eric Schiller, Chess Enterprises, 1991. ISBN 90-454-7019-5.
- How to Play the Belgrade Gambit, Eric Schiller, Chess Digest, 1997. ISBN 0-87568-294-4.
- How to Play the Chigorin Defense in the Queen's Gambit Declined, Eric Schiller, Chess Enterprises, 1991. ISBN 0-945470-11-8.
- How to Play the Dilworth Attack, Eric Schiller, Chess Enterprises, 1995. ISBN 0-945470-52-5, ISBN 4871874869.
- How to play the Fischer Attack in the Najdorf Sicilian, Ali Mortazavi & Eric Schiller, Chess Digest, 1995. ISBN 0-87568-254-5, ISBN 4871874826.
- How to Play the From Gambit, Eric Schiller, Chess Enterprises, 1992. ISBN 0-945470-14-2, ISBN 4871874486.
- How to Play the Goering Gambit, Eric Schiller, Chess Enterprises, 1995. ISBN 0-945470-63-0.
- How to Play the King's Indian Attack, Eric Schiller, Chess Enterprises, 1989. ISBN 0-931462-95-9.
- How to Play the Queen's Indian, Eric Schiller & Jonathan Goldman, Chess Enterprises, 1995. ISBN 0-931462-77-0.
- How to Play the Reti, Eric Schiller, Chess Enterprises, 1987. ISBN 0-931462-78-9.
- How to Play the Scotch Gambit, Eric Schiller, Chess Enterprises, 1992. ISBN 0-945470-24-X.
- How to Play the Torre Attack, Eric Schiller, Chess Digest, 1991. ISBN 0-87568-199-9.
- How to Play the Torre Attack (Revised), Eric Schiller, Chess Digest, 1995. ISBN 0-87568-199-9, ISBN 4871874893.
- How to Play the Winawer Countergambit, Eric Schiller, Chess Digest, 1995. ISBN 0-87568-272-3.
- How To Win With Hypermodern Chess Strategy, Raymond Keene & Eric Schiller, Hardinge-Simpole, 2003. ISBN 1-84382-105-2.
- Hunting the Castled King, Eric Schiller, Ishi Press, 2012, ISBN 4871874451.
- Hypermodern Opening Repertoire for White, Eric Schiller, Cardoza, 1999. ISBN 1-58042-015-X.
- Improve Your Endgame, Eric Schiller, Chess Enterprises, 1995. ISBN 0-945470-66-5.
- Janowski Indian, Eric Schiller, Chess Enterprises, 1988. ISBN 0-931462-97-5, ISBN 4871874354.
- Janowski Indian eBook, Eric Schiller, ChessCentral 2004.
- Joel Benjamin: Selected Games of the United States Champion, Bill Haines & Eric Schiller, Chess Enterprises, 1998. ISBN 0-945470-73-8.
- Kasparov's Opening Repertoire, Leonid Shamkovich & Eric Schiller, Batsford, 1995. ISBN 0-7134-5744-9, ISBN 4871874885.
- Killer Chess Tactics, Raymond Keene, Leonid Shamkovich & Eric Schiller, Cardoza, 2003. ISBN 1-58042-111-3.
- Learn from Bobby Fischer's Greatest Games, Eric Schiller, Cardoza, 2004. ISBN 1-58042-120-2.
- Learn from Garry Kasparov's Greatest Games, Eric Schiller, Cardoza, 2005. ISBN 1-58042-146-6.
- Learn to Attack with Rudolph Spielmann, Eric Schiller, Ishi Press ISBN 4871874346.
- Modern Defense: Averbakh Lines, Eric Schiller, Chess Enterprises, 1991. ISBN 0-931462-81-9.
- Modern Stonewall Dutch, Eric Schiller, Chess Enterprises, 1989. ISBN 0-931462-96-7, ISBN 4871874311.
- New Ideas in the RAT, Eric Schiller & Bill Maddex, Chess Enterprises, 1989. ISBN 0-931462-83-5.
- The Official Rules of Chess, Eric Schiller & Richard Peterson, Cardoza, 2001. ISBN 1-58042-025-7.
- The Official Rules of Chess, Eric Schiller, Cardoza, 2003. ISBN 1-58042-092-3.
- Orthodox Variation Queen's Gambit Declined, Eric Schiller, Chess Enterprises, 1984. ISBN 0-931462-34-7, ISBN 4871874842.
- Panov Attack: Volume 1, Eric Schiller, Chess Enterprises, 1994. ISBN 0-945470-43-6, ISBN 4871874494.
- Panov Attack: Volume 2, Eric Schiller, Chess Enterprises, 1995. ISBN 0-945470-47-9, ISBN 4871874494.
- Panov Attack: Volume 3 (Fianchetto Var.), Eric Schiller, Chess Enterprises, 1998, ISBN 4871874494.
- Play the Tarrasch, Leonid Shamkovich & Eric Schiller, Pergamon, 1984. ISBN 0-08-029747-1.
- Queens Gambit Accepted Smyslov Variation, Ishi Press ISBN 4-87187-888-0, ISBN 4871878880.
- The Pterodactyl Defense, Eric Schiller, ISBN 4871874834.
- The Ryder Gambit Accepted, Eric Schiller, Ishi Press ISBN 4871874435.
- The Rubinstein Attack, Eric Schiller, Universal, 2005. ISBN 1-58112-454-6.
- Saving Lost Positions, Leonid Shamkovich & Eric Schiller, Batsford, 1987. ISBN 0-02-053770-0.
- Saving Lost Positions revised 2011, Leonid Shamkovich & Eric Schiller, Ishi Press. ISBN 4-87187-441-9.
- The Schliemann Defense Volume 1: Tartakower Variation, Leonid Shamkovich & Eric Schiller, Chess Enterprises, 1993. ISBN 0-945470-32-0, ISBN 4871874362.
- The Schliemann Defense Volume 2: Classical Variations, Leonid Shamkovich & Eric Schiller, Chess Enterprises, 1996. ISBN 0-945470-60-6, ISBN 4871874362.
- Secrets of the King's Indian Defense, Eduard Gufeld & Eric Schiller, Cardoza, 1999. ISBN 1-58042-017-6.
- Secrets of the Sicilian Dragon, Eduard Gufeld & Eric Schiller, Cardoza, 1998. ISBN 0-940685-92-2.
- Sicilian Classical Richter Rauzer, Eric Schiller, Chess Enterprises, 1987. ISBN 0-931462-72-X.
- Sicilian Defence: Yugoslav Attack with 9 Bc4, Eric Schiller, Chess Enterprises, 1987. ISBN 0-931462-68-1.
- The Sicilian Dragon: Yugoslav Attack II, Eric Schiller, Chess Enterprises, 1989. ISBN 0-931462-88-6.
- Sicilian Modern Richter Rauzer Systems, Eric Schiller, Chess Enterprises, 1986. ISBN 0-931462-51-7.
- Sicilian Richter Rauzer: Systems with 7...a6, Eric Schiller, Chess Enterprises, 1987. ISBN 0-931462-66-5.
- Spanish Gambits, Leonid Shamkovich, Batsford, 1987. ISBN 0-02-029020-9.
- Spanish Gambits updated in 2011, Eric Schiller and Leonid Shamkovich, ISBN 4-87187-440-0.
- Spanish Inquisition I: Zaitsev Variation, Eric Schiller, Chess Enterprises, 1989. ISBN 0-931462-89-4.
- Spanish: Schliemann (Jaenisch), Leonid Shamkovich & Eric Schiller, Batsford, 1983. ISBN 0-7134-4248-4, ISBN 4871874362.
- Standard Chess Openings, Eric Schiller, Cardoza, 1997. ISBN 0-940685-72-8.
- Standard Chess Openings, Eric Schiller, Cardoza 2002. ISBN 1-58042-048-6.
- Strategy for Advanced Players, Eric Schiller, Chess Digest, 1992. ISBN 0-87568-202-2.
- Strategy for Advanced Players, Eric Schiller, Ishi Press, 2011. ISBN 4-87187-442-7.
- Survive and Beat Annoying Chess Openings Vol. 1 (Open Games), Eric Schiller & John Watson, Cardoza, 2003. ISBN 1-58042-073-7.
- Tarrasch French: Guimard Variation, Eric Schiller, Chess Enterprises, 1990. ISBN 0-945470-02-9, ISBN 4871874478.
- The Ultimate Tarrasch, Eric Schiller, Chess Central, 2001. ISBN 1-886846-42-1.
- Unorthodox Chess Openings, Eric Schiller, Cardoza, 1997. ISBN 0-940685-73-6.
- Unorthodox Chess Openings, Eric Schiller, Cardoza, 2002. ISBN 1-58042-072-9.
- Unorthodox Openings, Joel Benjamin & Eric Schiller, Batsford, 1987. ISBN 0-02-016590-0.
- U.S.S.R. versus Rest of World, Eric Schiller, The Chess Player, 1984. ISBN 0-906042-58-5.
- Von Hennig-Schara Gambit, Eric Schiller, Chess Enterprises, 1992. ISBN 0-945470-20-7.
- White to Play 1.e4 and Win, Eric Schiller, Chess Digest, 1992. ISBN 0-87568-206-5.
- Whiz Kids Teach Chess, Eric Schiller, Cardoza, 1998. ISBN 1-58042-007-9.
- Who's Afraid of the King's Gambit, Eric Schiller, Chess Enterprises, 1989. ISBN 0-931462-90-8.
- Who's Afraid of the King's Gambit (2nd Edition), Eric Schiller, Chess Enterprises, 1998. ISBN 0-945470-68-1, ISBN 4871874303.
- Wie spielt man Damenindisch, Eric Schiller, Walter Rau, 1987. ISBN 3-7919-0268-7.
- Wie spielt man die Reti-Eröffnung, Eric Schiller, Walter Rau, 1988. ISBN 3-7919-0279-2.
- Wie spielt man Katalanisch, Eric Schiller, Walter Rau, 1986. ISBN 3-7919-0249-0.
- Win with the Djin!, Eric Schiller, Chess Enterprises, 1994. ISBN 0-945470-40-1.
- Win with the Djin, Eric Schiller, Hardinge-Simpole, 2005. ISBN 1-84382-172-9.
- Winning with the Hypermodern, Raymond D. Keene & Eric Schiller, Batsford, 1994. ISBN 0-7134-6874-2.
- World Champion Combinations, Raymond D. Keene & Eric Schiller, Cardoza 1998. ISBN 0-940685-77-9.
- World Champion Openings, Eric Schiller, Cardoza, 1996. ISBN 0-940685-69-8.
- World Champion Openings, Eric Schiller, Cardoza, 2002. ISBN 1-58042-046-X.
- World Champion Tactics, Leonid Shamkovich & Eric Schiller, Cardoza, 1998. ISBN 1-58042-005-2.
