= New Ways of Analyzing Variation Asia-Pacific =

Sociolinguistics academic conference

New Ways of Analyzing Variation Asia-Pacific (often shortened to NWAV Asia-Pacific or NWAV-AP) is a biennial academic conference in sociolinguistics and the first sister conference of New Ways of Analyzing Variation. NWAV Asia-Pacific focuses on research based on empirical data with an emphasis on quantitative analysis of variation and change across the Asia-Pacific region, including speech communities, multilingualism, urbanization and migration, sociophonetics, style-shifting, language contact, variation in minority languages, dialect variation and change, dialect contact, variation in acquisition, language change across the lifespan, perceptual dialectology, and other related topics such as technological resources for sociolinguistic research. The first NWAV Asia-Pacific conference was held at University of Delhi, India in February, 2011, which included an inaugural conference address by William Labov.

The NWAV Asia/Pacific conference series has also led to the founding of a new peer-reviewed journal focused on language variation and change in this region: Asia-Pacific Language Variation (Benjamins Publishing).

== Past conferences ==
Year	Title	Location	Host	Website
2025	NWAV-AP 8	Singapore	Nanyang Technological University	
2022	NWAV-AP 7	Bangkok, Thailand	Chulalongkorn University	
2021	NWAV-AP 6	Singapore	National University of Singapore	
2018	NWAV-AP 5	Brisbane, Australia	University of Queensland	
2016	NWAV-AP 4	Chiayi, Taiwan	National Chung Cheng University	
2014	NWAV-AP 3	Wellington, New Zealand	Victoria University of Wellington	
2012	NWAV-AP 2	Tokyo, Japan	National Institute for Japanese Language and Linguistics	
2011	NWAV-AP	Delhi, India	University of Delhi	

== See also ==
- New Ways of Analyzing Variation
- Researching language variation and change
- Dialectology
- Linguistics conferences
- Sociolinguistics
- Variable rules analysis
