= MSCL =

MSCL may refer to:

- Marine Services Company, a passenger and cargo shipping company in Tanzania
- My So-Called Life, an American television teen drama
- Moscow Student Conference on Linguistics, an international linguistic conference for young researchers
- Methanesulfonyl chloride, an Organic Compound with the chemical formula CH_{3}ClO_{2}S.
- Large-conductance mechanosensitive channel, MscL, membrane proteins
