= Linguistic Bibliography =

- Producer: Comité International Permanent des Linguistes/Permanent International Committee of Linguists (Netherlands)
- History: 2002 to present
- Languages: English, French

Access
- Providers: Brill
- Cost: Subscription

Coverage
- Disciplines: theoretical linguistics
- Record depth: Index
- Temporal coverage: 1993 to present
- Geospatial coverage: Worldwide
- No. of records: 400,000
- Update frequency: Monthly

Print edition
- Print title: Linguistic Bibliography
- Print dates: 1949 to present
- ISSN: 0378-4592

Links
- Website: www.linguisticbibliography.com

The Linguistic Bibliography / Bibliographie Linguistique is an annual publication which first appeared in 1949. The publication provides comprehensive bibliographical descriptions of publications in theoretical linguistics, with about 20,000 items added per year. Since 2002, the database has also been available online, as Linguistic Bibliography Online, and contains data from 1993 onward.

== Overview ==
The Linguistic Bibliography covers all disciplines of theoretical linguistics, both general and language specific, from all geographical areas, with the emphasis on lesser-known Indo-European and non-Indo-European languages. Both Linguistic Bibliography / Bibliographie Linguistique and Linguistic Bibliography Online are published by Brill Leiden, Netherlands, on the authority of the Permanent International Committee of Linguists and under the auspices of the International Council for Philosophy and Human Sciences. As of 1993, the online edition contained all entries of the printed volumes, with new records added on a monthly basis. Annual volumes of the Linguistic Bibliography are still published in print.

== Organization and features ==
Linguistic Bibliography's Online database contains over 360,000 records and is cross-searchable. It is updated 10 times per year with around 20,000 new records added per year. The database contains over 114,000 person's names, 2,400 journals and 10,000 publishers with records classified according to language and subject descriptors. Titles are given in their original language, with English translations provided of titles in lesser-known languages. Only scientific publications are included, and applied linguistic publications are listed only if they have theoretical implications.

The Bibliography is published on the authority of the Permanent International Committee of Linguistics (CIPL) and is in accordance with the rules of the International Standard Bibliographic Description (ISBD) and the International Federation of Library Associations (IFLA). Contributors include a network of international specialists, with some of these experts responsible for a specific field of linguistics, while others cover the production of their home country.

The languages of the world are grouped under large categories, e.g. "Semitic". A separate section for Pidgin and Creole languages was added in 1952. Though linguists today study sign languages as true languages, the category "Sign languages" was not added until the 1988 volume, when it appeared with 39 entries.

=== Categories ===
Topics covered include:

- General Reference Works
- General Linguistics
- Indo-European Languages
- Asianic and Mediterranean Languages
- Basque and Ancient Languages of the Iberian Peninsula
- Hamito-Semitic / Afro-Asiatic Languages
- Caucasian Languages
- Eurasiatic Languages
- Dravidian Languages
- Languages of Mainland Southeast Asia
- Austronesian, Papuan and Australian Languages
- Indigenous Languages of the Americas
- Pidgin and Creole Languages (from 1952 onward)
- Subsaharan Africa Languages
- Sign Languages (from 1988 onward)
- Planned Languages

== See also ==
- International Congress of Linguists
