= Ical =

Ical may refer to:

- Calendar (Apple), Apple's personal calendar application, formerly called iCal
- ICAL - International Center for Accelerative Learning, USA
- ical (Unix), a Tcl/tk calendar package
- iCalendar, a standardised calendar data exchange standard
- Aburizal Bakrie, a politician
- ICaL an ionic current through the L-type calcium channel
- International Conference on Austronesian Linguistics, an academic conference
