= Kolloquium Namenforschung Schweiz =

The Kolloquium Namenforschung Schweiz is a workshop-style meeting that regularly brings together researchers of onomastics in Switzerland. It is an initiative of scholars from various regions of Switzerland who are intensively engaged (among other things) in the study of proper names and who devote their attention to this subject. The interest group that launched the colloquium seeks to promote constructive exchange through regular meetings, both among research institutions and individual researchers, and to enrich Swiss onomastic research (which also takes place outside universities) with a stronger discussion of methods and theory wherever possible.

Edition	Location and Date	Organiser(s)	Topic
14	Schwyz, 17.04.2026	Nathalie Henseler-Pfyl	Interdisziplinarität in der Namenforschung / L'interdisciplinarité en onomastique / Interdisciplinarità nella onomastica
13	Zurich, 11.04.2025	Schweizerisches Idiotikon	Namenforschung Schweiz: Quo vadis?
12	Berne, 12.04.2024	Forschungsstelle Berner Namenbuch, University of Berne	Namenforschung zwischen Tradition und Moderne
11	Gelfingen, 21.04.2023	Luzerner Namenbuch	Namengebung und Landschaftsstrukturen
10	St. Gallen, 11.02.2022	St. Galler Namenbuch, University of Zurich	Besiedlung und Benennung: Onomastische Zugänge
9	Berne, 04.09.2020	Familiennamenatlas der Deutschschweiz, University of Berne	Personennamen synchron und diachron
8	Geneva, 05.02.2019	University of Geneva	La néotoponymie et la toponymie politique
7	Lausanne, 05.02.2018	Atlas toponymique du Canton de Vaud, University of Lausanne	Die Toponymie der Waadt und der Romandie
6	Zurich, 06.02.2017	Deutsches Seminar, University of Zurich	Personenname und Ort
5	Olten, 01.02.2016	Forschungsstelle Solothurnisches Namenbuch, University of Basel	Namenforschung nach den Namenbüchern: Mit digitalen Daten und neuen Forschungsfragen in die Zukunft
4	Berne, 02.02.2015	Forschungsstelle Berner Namenbuch, University of Berne	Namenforschung und Öffentlichkeit / Onomastique et espace public / Onomastica e divulgazione
3	Bellinzona, 17.02.2014	Repertorio toponomastico ticinese	Toponomastique pour tous: comment? / Toponomastik für alle: wie?
2	Zurich, 04.02.2013	Deutsches Seminar, University of Zurich	Erheben und Darstellen von Daten in der Namenforschung
1	Basel, 06.02.2012	Forschungsstelle Orts- und Flurnamenbuch Basel-Stadt, University of Basel	Namen als Forschungsdaten. Methodische und theoretische Probleme bei der Auswahl, Erhebung und Auswertung

== See also ==
- List of linguistics conferences
