= Mainzer Namentagung =

Linguistics conference held in Mainz, Germany

The Mainzer Namentagung is a series of conferences with focus on all areas of (linguistic) onomastics. First, it was held annually, since 2021 biennially at the University of Mainz or at the Akademie der Wissenschaften und der Literatur (alternating with the Tagung des Arbeitskreises für Namenforschung at the Gesellschaft für Namenforschung) .

| Edition | Date | Topic |
|---|---|---|
| 2025 | 29.09.–01.10.2025 | Migrationsonomastik: Personennamen im Kontext von Wanderungsbewegungen |
| 2023 | 20.–22.09.2023 | Namen und Politik |
| 2021 | 13.–14.09.2021 | Werbende Namen |
| 2018 | 17.–18.09.2018 | Namengeographie |
| 2017 | 18.–19.09.2017 | Toponyme – eine Standortbestimmung |
| 2016 | 10.–11.10.2016 | Linguistik der Eigennamen |
| 2015 | 14.–15.09.2015 | Rufnamen als soziale Marker – Namenvergabe und Namenverwendung |
| 2014 | 15.–17.09.2014 | "Sonstige" Namenarten – Stiefkinder der Onomastik |
| 2013 | 07.–08.10.2013 | Bello, Gin Tonic, Krake Paul – Individualnamen von Tieren |
| 2012 | 01.–02.10.2012 | Linguistik der Familiennamen |
| 2008 | 02.–04.10.2008 | Familiennamengeographie |

== See also ==
- List of linguistics conferences
