= Southeast Asian Linguistics Society =

The Southeast Asian Linguistics Society (SEALS) is a linguistic society dedicated to the study of languages and linguistics in mainland and insular Southeast Asia. It was founded in 1991 by Martha Ratliff and Eric Schiller. Paul Sidwell is currently president.

== Journal ==
Journal of the Southeast Asian Linguistics Society
- Discipline: Linguistics
- Language: English
- Edited by: Mark Alves

Publication details
- History: 2009–present
- Publisher: University of Hawaiʻi Press (United States)
- Open access: Yes
- License: Creative Commons Attribution-NonCommercial-NoDerivatives 4.0 International License

Standard abbreviations
- ISO 4: J. Southeast Asian Linguist. Soc.

Indexing
- ISSN: 1836-6821
- OCLC no.: 1120469534

Links
- Journal homepage

The Journal of the Southeast Asian Linguistics Society is the society's peer-reviewed open-access academic journal covering research on the languages of mainland and insular Southeast Asia, including Sino-Tibetan, Austroasiatic, Kra–Dai, Hmong–Mien, and Austronesian languages. It was established in 2009 and is published by the University of Hawaii Press. The editor-in-chief is Mark Alves (Montgomery College).

The journal was formally established at the SEALS 17 meeting in September 2007 at the University of Maryland. It supersedes the SEALS Conference Proceedings, which were published by Arizona State University. The first volume was published in 2009. The journal uses a Creative Commons License.

== Conferences ==
The society holds annual conferences generally in late May. Usually, 50–100 papers are presented in 2–3 days. Papers and presentations are archived online, with the exception of some earlier conferences. SEALS conferences have been held since 1991. The first meeting, held in 1991 at Wayne State University in Michigan, was attended by Paul K. Benedict, William J. Gedney, Gérard Diffloth, James A. Matisoff, Laurent Sagart, Jerry Edmondson, Graham Thurgood, among others.

== See also ==
- List of linguistics conferences
- List of linguistics journals
