= Leonid Shamkovich =

Soviet-American chess grandmaster (1923–2005)

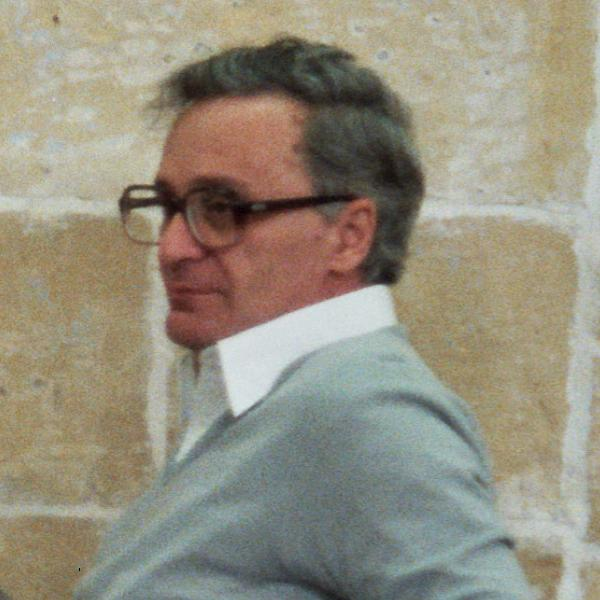
- Shamkovich at the 1980 Chess Olympiad, Malta

Personal information
- Native name: Леони́д Шамко́вич
- Born: Leonid Aleksandrovich Shamkovich; 1 June 1923 Rostov-on-Don, Soviet Union
- Died: 22 April 2005 (aged 81) Brooklyn, New York City

Chess career
- Country: Soviet Union (before 1975); Israel (1975–1978); United States (after 1978)
- Title: Grandmaster (1965)
- Peak rating: 2540 (July 1973)
- Peak ranking: No. 41 (July 1973)

Leonid Aleksandrovich Shamkovich (Russian: Леони́д Алекса́ндрович Шамко́вич; June 1, 1923 – April 22, 2005) was an American chess Grandmaster and chess writer.

He was born in a Jewish family in Rostov-on-Don in Russia.

== Chess career ==
Shamkovich became a Grandmaster in 1965 and won several tournaments, with his best victory coming at Sochi in 1967, where he tied for first place with Nikolai Krogius, Vladimir Simagin, Boris Spassky and Alexander Zaitsev. Other notable results included a tie for 3rd at the 1962 Moscow Championship (behind Yuri Averbakh and Evgeny Vasiukov) and finishing third at Mariánské Lázně 1965 (behind Paul Keres and Vlastimil Hort).

Shamkovich left the Soviet Union in 1975, moving first to Israel, then Canada, and finally the United States, where he lived the remainder of his life. He won the 1975 Canadian Open Chess Championship. He continued to play through the 1990s, and wrote several chess books.

Shamkovich tied for first place in the 1987 U.S. Masters Chess Championship.

His Sacrifice in Chess begins: "A real sacrifice involves a radical change in the character of a game which cannot be effected without foresight, fantasy, and the willingness to risk."

== Personal life ==
His aristocratic bearing and manner of speech earned him the nickname "Prince".

Shamkovich died of complications from Parkinson's disease and cancer in his Brooklyn home on April 22, 2005.

== Books ==
- Caro–Kann 4 ...Nd7, Leonid Shamkovich & Eric Schiller, Chess Enterprises, 1987. ISBN 0-931462-26-6.
- Chess Sacrifices, Leonid Shamkovich & A. Kalajs (Translator), Chess Player, 1976. ISBN 978-0900928994.
- The Chess Terrorist's Handbook, Leonid Shamkovich & Paul Hodges (Editor), American Chess Promotions, 1995. ISBN 978-0939298570.
- Fischer–Spassky 1992: World Chess Championship Rematch, Leonid Shamkovich, Jan R. Cartier & Lou Hays (Editor), Hays Publishing, 1993. ISBN 978-1880673904.
- The Gruenfeld Defense, Leonid Shamkovich & Jan R. Cartier, Hays Publishing, 1997. ISBN 978-1880673157.
- Karpov–Kasparov 1990: An Expert Analysis, Don Maddox, Ron Henley & Leonid Shamkovich (Contributor), Three Rivers Press, 1991. ISBN 978-0812919233.
- Kasparov's Opening Repertoire, Leonid Shamkovich & Eric Schiller, B.T. Batsford, 1995. ISBN 0-7134-5744-9, and4871874885.
- Killer Chess Tactics: World Champion Tactics and Combinations, Raymond Keene, Eric Schiller & Leonid Shamkovich, Cardoza Publishing, 2003 (2nd Edition). ISBN 978-1580421119.
- The Modern Chess Sacrifice, Leonid Shamkovich, David McKay Company, 1978 (2nd Edition). ISBN 978-0679130543.
- A New Era, Michael Khodarkovsky, Leonid Shamkovich & Garry Kasparov (Foreword by), Ballantine Books, 1997. ISBN 978-0345408907.
- Play The Tarrasch, Leonid Shamkovich & Eric Schiller, Pergamon Press, 1984. ISBN 978-0080297484.
- Sacrifice in Chess, Leonid Shamkovich, Alfred Kalnajs & Son, 1972. ASIN B00070WWB8.
- Saving Lost Positions, Leonid Shamkovich & Eric Schiller, B.T. Batsford, 1987. ISBN 0-02-053770-0.
- Saving Lost Positions, Leonid Shamkovich & Eric Schiller, Ishi Press, revised in 2011. ISBN 978-4871874410.
- Schliemann Defense, Eric Schiller & Leonid Shamkovich, Ishi Press, 2012. ISBN 978-4871874366.
- The Schliemann Defense • Volume 1 Tartakower Variation: 5...Nf6, Leonid Shamkovich & Eric Schiller, Chess Enterprises, 1993. ISBN 0-945470-32-0, and4871874362.
- The Schliemann Defense • Volume 2 Classical Variation, Leonid Shamkovich & Eric Schiller, Chess Enterprises, 1996. ISBN 0-945470-60-6, and4871874362.
- Spanish Gambits, Leonid Shamkovich & Eric Schiller, B.T. B.T. Batsford, 1986. ISBN 978-0713452969.
- Spanish Gambits, Leonid Shamkovich & Eric Schiller, Ishi Press, updated in 2011. ISBN 978-4871874403.
- Spanish: Schliemann (Jaenisch), Leonid Shamkovich & Eric Schiller, B.T. Batsford, 1983. ISBN 0-7134-4248-4, and4871874362.
- Tactical Chess Training, Leonid Shamkovich & Jan R. Cartier, Hays Publishing, 1996. ISBN 978-1880673102.
- The Tactical World Of Chess, Leonid Shamkovich, Three Rivers Press, 1981. ISBN 978-0679134008.
- World Champion Tactics, Leonid Shamkovich & Eric Schiller, Cardoza Publishing, 1999. ISBN 978-1580420051.

== See also ==
- List of Jewish chess players
