= New Ways of Analyzing Variation =

Annual sociolinguistics conference

New Ways of Analyzing Variation (NWAV) is an annual North American academic conference in sociolinguistics. NWAV attracts researchers and students conducting linguistic scientific investigations into patterns of language variation, the study of language change in progress, and the interrelationship between language and society, including how language variation is shaped by and continually shapes societal institutions, social and interpersonal relationships, and individual and group identities.

The conference originated under the title New Ways of Analyzing Variation in English in October 1972 at Georgetown University; "English" was dropped from the conference title later as languages other than English entered the conference's focus. The most recent meeting, NWAV 54, was held in 2026 in Montreal, hosted by the Université de Montréal. The 2027 meeting will be hosted by the University of Illinois Urbana-Champaign.

== Past conferences ==
Year	Title	Location	Host
2026	NWAV 54	Montreal	Université de Montréal
2025	NWAV 53	Ann Arbor, Michigan	University of Michigan
2024	NWAV 52	Miami Beach, Florida	Florida International University and University of Miami
2023	NWAV 51	New York City	Queens College
2022	NWAV 50	San Jose, California	Stanford University
2021	NWAV 49	online	The University of Texas at Austin
2019	NWAV 48	Eugene, Oregon	University of Oregon
2018	NWAV 47	New York City	New York University and City University of New York
2017	NWAV 46	Madison, Wisconsin	University of Wisconsin–Madison
2016	NWAV 45	Vancouver	Simon Fraser University and University of Victoria
2015	NWAV 44	Toronto	University of Toronto and York University
2014	NWAV 43	Chicago	University of Illinois at Urbana–Champaign and University of Illinois at Chicago
2013	NWAV 42	Pittsburgh	University of Pittsburgh and Carnegie Mellon University
2012	NWAV 41	Bloomington, Indiana	Indiana University, Bloomington
2011	NWAV 40	Washington, D.C.	Georgetown University
2010	NWAV 39	San Antonio	University of Texas, San Antonio
2009	NWAV 38	Ottawa	University of Ottawa
2008	NWAV 37	Houston	Rice University
2007	NWAV 36	Philadelphia	University of Pennsylvania
2006	NWAV 35	Columbus, Ohio	Ohio State University
2005	NWAV 34	New York City	New York University
2004	NWAV 33	Ann Arbor, Michigan	University of Michigan
2003	NWAV 32	Philadelphia	University of Pennsylvania
2002	NWAV 31	Stanford, California	Stanford University
2001	NWAV 30	Raleigh, North Carolina	North Carolina State University
2000	NWAV 29	East Lansing, Michigan	Michigan State University
1999	NWAV 28	Toronto	University of Toronto
1998	NWAV 27	Athens, Georgia	University of Georgia
1997	NWAV 26	Quebec City	Laval University
1996	NWAV 25	Las Vegas	University of Nevada, Las Vegas
1995	NWAV 24	Philadelphia	University of Pennsylvania
1994	NWAV 23	Stanford, California	Stanford University
1993	NWAV 22	Ottawa	University of Ottawa
1992	NWAV 21	Ann Arbor, Michigan	University of Michigan
1991	NWAV 20	Washington, D.C.	Georgetown University
1990	NWAV 19	Philadelphia	University of Pennsylvania
1989	NWAV 18	Durham, North Carolina	Duke University
1988	NWAV 17	Montreal	University of Montreal
1987	NWAV 16	Austin, Texas	University of Texas, Austin
1986	NWAV 15	Stanford, California	Stanford University
1985	NWAV 14	Washington, D.C.	Georgetown University
1984	NWAV 13	Philadelphia	University of Pennsylvania
1983	NWAVE 12	Montreal	University of Montreal
1982	NWAVE 11	Washington, D.C.	Georgetown University
1981	NWAVE X	Philadelphia	University of Pennsylvania
1980	NWAVE IX	Ann Arbor, Michigan	University of Michigan
1979	NWAVE VIII	Montreal	University of Quebec, Montreal
1978	NWAVE VII	Washington, D.C.	Georgetown University
1977	NWAVE VI	Washington, D.C.	Georgetown University
1976	NWAVE V	Washington, D.C.	Georgetown University
1975	NWAVE IV	Washington, D.C.	Georgetown University
1974	NWAVE III	Washington, D.C.	Georgetown University
1973	NWAVE II	Washington, D.C.	Georgetown University
1972	NWAVE I	Washington, D.C.	Georgetown University

== See also ==
- New Ways of Analyzing Variation Asia-Pacific
- Dialectology
- Linguistics conferences
- Sociolinguistics
- Variable rules analysis
