= Days of Swiss Linguistics =

The Days of Swiss Linguistics (DSL) (German: Tage der Schweizer Linguistik (TSL), French: Journées de linguistique suisse (JLS), Italian: Giornate della linguistica svizzere (GLS)) is a series of linguistics conferences held biennially at one of the Swiss universities on behalf of the Swiss Linguistics Society (SSG). It is an international conference for researchers from Switzerland, Europe and beyond. So far, 11 editions of the conference have been carried out, the next conference will take place in 2022 at Université de Lausanne.

Edition	Date	University	City	Official Title(s)/Topic(s)
14	03.06.2026	Università della Svizzera italiana	Lugano	–
13	28.06.2024	Université de Neuchâtel	Neuchâtel	–
12	7.11.2022	Université de Lausanne	Lausanne	–
11	6.11.2020	Université de Fribourg	Fribourg (online event)	–
10	12.10.2018	Universität Bern	Bern	–
9	29.06.-01.07.2016	Université de Genève	Geneva	Diversité des structures et des significations dans le langage naturel: approches empiriques, expérimentales et théoriques (Diversity of structures and meanings in natural language: empirical, experimental and theoretical approaches / Diversität von Strukturen und Bedeutungen in natürlich Sprachen: empirisch, experimentell und theoretische Zugänge)
8	19.-21.06.2014	Universität Zürich	Zurich	Dynamik der Variation (Dynamique de la variation / La dinamica della variazione / Dynamics of variation)
7	13.-14.09.2012	Università della Svizzera italiana	Lugano	L’empiria in linguistica: varietà e complessità degli approcci (L'empirie en linguistique: variété et complexité des approches / Die Empirie in der Linguistik: Methodenvielfalt und -komplexität)
6	09.-10.12.2010	Université de Neuchâtel	Neuchâtel	Langue et Cognition (Sprache und Kognition)
5	20.-21.11.2008	Zürcher Hochschule für Angewandte Wissenschaften	Winterthur	Messen in der Linguistik
4	20.-21.11.2006	Universität Basel	Basel	–
3	01.-02.10.2004	Universität Bern	Bern	–
2	08.-09.11.2002	Universität Bern	Bern	–
1	05.-06.11.1999	Universität Bern	Bern	–

== See also ==
- List of linguistics conferences
