= International Conference on Austronesian Linguistics =

Academic conference

International Conference on Austronesian Linguistics (ICAL)
- Status: Active
- Frequency: 3–4 years
- Years active: 1974–present

The International Conference on Austronesian Linguistics (ICAL) is an academic conference that focuses on research in Austronesian languages and linguistics. It is held every three to four years.

== List of meetings ==
A full list of meetings, including full conferences, workshops, and other meetings, is as follows.

Year	Conference	Dates	Location	Country
1974	1-ICAL	January 2–7	University of Hawaiʻi at Mānoa, Honolulu, Hawaii	United States
1978	2-ICAL	January 4-12	Australian National University, Canberra	Australia
1981	3-ICAL	January 19–24	Denpasar, Bali	Indonesia
1984	4-ICAL	August 13–18	Suva	Fiji
1988	5-ICAL	January 11–16	Auckland	New Zealand
1991	6-ICAL	May 20–24	University of Hawaiʻi at Mānoa, Honolulu, Hawaii	United States
1994	7-ICAL	August 22–27	Leiden University, Leiden	Netherlands
1997	8-ICAL	December 28–30	Taipei	Taiwan
2002	9-ICAL	January 8–11	Australian National University, Canberra	Australia
2006	10-ICAL	January 17–20	Puerto Princesa, Palawan	Philippines
2009	11-ICAL	June 22–26	Aussois	France
2012	12-ICAL	July 2–6	Badung, Bali	Indonesia
2015	13-ICAL	July 18–23	Academia Sinica, Taipei	Taiwan
2018	14-ICAL	July 17–20	Antananarivo	Madagascar
2021	15-ICAL	June 28–July 1	Palacký University, Olomouc	Czech Republic
2024	16-ICAL	June 20–24	Linguistic Society of the Philippines / De La Salle University, Manila	Philippines

== See also ==
- List of linguistics conferences
