= North American Conference on Chinese Linguistics =

Logo from NACCL-20, held in 2008

The North American Conference on Chinese Linguistics (NACCL) is an annual academic conference that focuses on research in Chinese language and linguistics.

== History ==
The conference was first held in 1989 at Ohio State University, as the Northeast Conference on Chinese Linguistics (NECCL), and changed its name to "North American Conference on Chinese Linguistics" at its third annual session in 1991. It is held every year in late spring, and includes both theoretical and empirical research from all subfields of Chinese linguistics; presenters include graduate students in addition to professors and other well-established scholars. The conference generally hosts talks both in Chinese and in English. The proceedings are published annually after the conference is finished; after NACCL-20 in 2008, the proceedings were published online for the first time.

== Subjects ==
Subjects presented include: Sociolinguistics, Phonetics/Phonology, Syntax, Semantics, Pragmatics, Orthography, Historical linguistics, Computational/Corpus Linguistics, Language Acquisition, Psycholinguistics, and Morphology.

== Past conferences ==
Year	Title	Host
1989	NECCL-1	Ohio State University
1990	NECCL-2	University of Pennsylvania
1991	NACCL-3	Cornell University
1992	NACCL-4	University of Michigan
1993	NACCL-5	University of Delaware
1994	NACCL-6	University of Southern California
1995	NACCL-7	University of Wisconsin–Madison
1996	NACCL-8	University of Illinois at Urbana-Champaign
1997	NACCL-9	University of Victoria
1998	NACCL-10	Stanford University
1999	NACCL-11	Harvard University
2000	NACCL-12	San Diego State University
2001	NACCL-13	University of California, Irvine
2002	NACCL-14	University of Arizona
2003	NACCL-15	Michigan State University
2004	NACCL-16	University of Iowa
2005	NACCL-17	Defense Language Institute
2006	NACCL-18	Western Washington University
2007	NACCL-19	Columbia University
2008	NACCL-20	Ohio State University
2009	NACCL-21	Bryant University
2010	NACCL-22	Harvard University
2011	NACCL-23	University of Oregon
2012	NACCL-24	University of San Francisco
2013	NACCL-25	University of Michigan
2014	NACCL-26	University of Maryland
2015	NACCL-27	University of California, Los Angeles
2016	NACCL-28	Brigham Young University
2017	NACCL-29	Rutgers University
2018	NACCL-30	Ohio State University
2019	NACCL-31	Suspended for 2018-2019 academic year.
2020	NACCL-32	University of Connecticut (virtual)
2021	NACCL-33	University of Chicago (virtual)
2022	NACCL-34	Indiana University
2023	NACCL-35	Suspended for 2022-2023 academic year.
2024	NACCL-36	Pomona College

== See also ==
- List of linguistics conferences
