= William J. Gedney =

American linguist (1915–1999)

- Born: April 4, 1915; Orchards, Washington, U.S.
- Died: November 14, 1999 (aged 84); Ann Arbor, Michigan, U.S.
- Spouse: Choy Manachip (m. 1953; died 1981)
- Children: 4

Academic background
- Education: Whitman College (B.A.); Yale University (Ph.D.)
- Thesis: Indic Loanwords in Spoken Thai (1947)
- Academic advisor: Franklin Edgerton

Academic work
- Discipline: Linguist
- Institutions: State Teachers College at New Paltz (late 1950s); University of Ceylon (1959–60); University of Michigan (1960–80)
- Main interests: Tai languages; Historical linguistics; Sanskrit

William J. Gedney (April 4, 1915 – November 14, 1999) was an American linguist notable for his work on Thai and related Tai languages.

== Life ==
Gedney was born in Orchards, Washington, and spent his childhood there. He was the son of John Marshall Gedney and Viola Gedney (nee Woster), the descendants of English immigrants. Gedney's father died of pneumonia in 1918, when Gedney was three years old. In 1935, Gedney graduated magna cum laude from Whitman College. After graduation, Gedney lived in Leavenworth, Washington and worked as a high school English teacher. During the summers, he occupied himself seriously with linguistics. After the outbreak of the Second World War, he was drafted into the army in August 1942 and assigned to the Army Language Unit in New York City, where he began to work with the Thai language. During this period in New York he also began doctoral studies in Sanskrit at Yale University as a student of Franklin Edgerton. He completed his PhD in 1947, with the dissertation Indic Loanwords in Spoken Thai. He then moved to Thailand, where he studied Thai language and literature, working with some of the most important scholars of the country. He met Choy Manachip, a native of Ayutthaya Province, there in Thailand, and they wed in 1953. Mrs. Gedney was one of the native speakers of Thai consulted for the Thai grammars written by Richard B. Noss (1954, expanded 1964). Gedney was professor of linguistics at the University of Ceylon 1959–60, then in 1960 took a position teaching linguistics and Thai at the University of Michigan in Ann Arbor, where he was in the English department until a department of linguistics was formed there in 1963. In his early years at Michigan, he helped develop the first Thai language training program for the Peace Corps.

Gedney taught at the University of Michigan until his retirement in 1980, and served as chair of the linguistics department from 1972–75. During his career, Gedney was active in the Linguistic Society of America, the American Oriental Society, the Siam Society, the Association for Asian Studies and Southeast Asian Linguistics Society. In 1981, he served as vice president of the American Oriental Society, and in 1982 as president.

During his years of study Gedney began collecting Thai literature, ultimately building a 14,000 volume collection, which he donated in 1975 to the University of Michigan. Gedney specialized throughout his career on documenting the Tai–Kadai languages. He sought in particular many in the less spoken languages of this family in Southeast Asia and southern China in order to capture the characteristics of these languages. He was known for the accuracy of his notes on the tonal and phonological characteristics of these languages, and developed important word lists and representations for the study and comparisons of their tone.

In all Gedney worked on over 22 languages, including Saek, Lue, and Yay, often creating the first dictionaries of those languages. His findings have been published in an eight-volume series with the Center for South and South East Asian Studies at the University of Michigan, edited by Thomas John Hudak, one of Gedney's students.

By focusing on data and his extensive knowledge of the Tai–Kadai languages, Gedney established himself as a leader in the comparative-historical study of Tai languages and dialects. But his influence went far beyond linguistics. Researchers from other disciplines including history, political science, art history and anthropology sought his advice.

William J. Gedney died on 14 November 1999 in Ann Arbor, Michigan.

== Students ==
Gedney advised many dissertations in Tai linguistics, and made his extensive field notes available to his students. He continued to serve on dissertation committees after his retirement in 1980. A selection of Gedney's notable students and their dissertations is as follows:

- Gething, Thomas Wilson (1966). Some Aspects of Semantic Structure in Standard Thai. University of Michigan.
- Lekawatana, Pongsri (1970). Verb Phrases in Thai: A Study in Deep-Case Relationships. University of Michigan.
- Scovel, Thomas Scott (1970). A Grammar of Time in Thai. University of Michigan.
- Khanittanan, Wilaiwan Wichienrot (1973). The Influence of Siamese on Five Lao Dialects. University of Michigan.
- Oshika, Beatrice Reyes Teodoro (1973). The Relationship of Kam-Sui-Mak to Tai. University of Michigan.
- Beebe, Leslie Moir (1974). Socially Conditioned Variation in Bangkok Thai. University of Michigan.
- Hartmann, John Ferdinand (1976). The Linguistic and Memory Structure of Tai-Lue Oral Narrative. University of Michigan.
- Chamberlain, James Robert (1977). An Introduction to Proto-Tai Zoology. University of Michigan.
- Grima, John Anthony Jr. (1978). Categories of Zero Nominal Reference and Clausal Structure in Thai. University of Michigan.
- Bickner, Robert John (1981). A Linguistic Study of a Thai Literary Classic. University of Michigan.
- Hudak, Thomas John (1981). The Indigenization of Pali Meters in Thai. University of Michigan.
- Peyasantiwong, Patcharin (1981). A Study of Final Particles in Conversational Thai. University of Michigan.

== Publications ==
=== Selected Papers on Comparative Tai Studies ===
Published in 1989, Selected Papers on Comparative Tai Studies collected together fourteen of Gedney's most important papers:

1. Future Directions in Comparative Tai Linguistics
2. On the Thai Evidence for Austro-Thai
3. A Spectrum of Phonological Features in Tai
4. A Checklist for Determining Tones in Tai Dialects
5. Speculations on Early Tai Tones
6. Evidence for Another Series of Voiced Initials in Proto-Tai
7. A Puzzle in Comparative Tai Phonology
8. Notes on Tai Nuea
9. The Saek Language of Nakhon Phanom Province
10. Yay, a Northern Tai Language in North Vietnam
11. A Comparative Sketch of White, Black and Red Tai
12. A Siamese Innovation
13. Special Vocabularies in Thai
14. Siamese Verse Forms in Historical Perspective

=== Other papers ===
- Gedney, William J. (1985). "Confronting the Unknown: Tonal Splits and the Genealogy of Tai-Kadai" (PDF). In Thurgood, Graham; Matisoff, James A.; Bradley, David (eds.). Linguistics of the Sino-Tibetan Area: The State of the Art: Papers Presented to Paul K. Benedict for His 71st Birthday. Pacific Linguistics, Series C, No. 87. Canberra: Department of Linguistics, Research School of Pacific Studies, Australian National University. pp. 116–124.
- Gedney, William J. (1986). "A Gallery of Picturesque Personalities" (PDF). In Bickner, Robert J.; Hudak, Thomas J.; Peyasantiwong, Patcharin (eds.). Papers from a Conference on Thai Studies in Honor of William J. Gedney. Michigan Papers on South and Southeast Asia. Vol. 25. Ann Arbor, Michigan: Center for South and Southeast Asian Studies, University of Michigan. pp. 1–18.
- Gedney, William J. (1989). "Tai Names for the Ox" (PDF). In Davidson, Jeremy H. C. S. (ed.). South-East Asian Linguisitics: Essays in Honour of Eugénie J. A. Henderson (PDF). Collected Papers in Oriental and African Studies. London: School of Oriental and African Studies, University of London. pp. 111–127.
- Gedney, William J. (1991). "Comments on Linguistic Arguments Relating to Inscription One" (PDF). In Chamberlain, James R. (ed.). The Ram Khamhaeng Controversy: Collected Papers. Bangkok: Siam Society. pp. 193–226.
- Gedney, William J. (1997). "'Near' and 'Far' in Tai". In Edmondson, Jerold A.; Solnit, David B. (eds.). Comparative Kadai: The Tai Branch. Publications in Linguistics 124. Dallas, Texas: Summer Institute of Linguistics and University of Texas at Arlington. pp. 267–289. ISBN 1-55671-005-4.

=== Publications by Thomas John Hudak ===
Much of Gedney's work on Tai languages was published by his student Thomas John Hudak:

- Hudak, Thomas John, ed. (1991). William J. Gedney's The Yay Language: Glossary, Texts, and Translations. Michigan Papers on South and Southeast Asia. Vol. 38. Ann Arbor, Michigan: Center for South and Southeast Asian Studies, University of Michigan. doi:10.3998/mpub.19517. ISBN 978-0-89148-066-2.
- Hudak, Thomas John, ed. (1991). William J. Gedney's The Tai Dialect of Lungming: Glossary, Texts, and Translations. Michigan Papers on South and Southeast Asia. Vol. 39. Ann Arbor, Michigan: Center for South and Southeast Asian Studies, University of Michigan. doi:10.3998/mpub.19520. ISBN 978-0-89148-067-9.
- Hudak, Thomas John, ed. (1993). William J. Gedney's The Saek Language: Glossary, Texts, and Translations. Michigan Papers on South and Southeast Asia. Vol. 41. Ann Arbor, Michigan: Center for South and Southeast Asian Studies, University of Michigan. ISBN 978-0-89148-073-0.
- Hudak, Thomas John, ed. (1994). William J. Gedney's Southwestern Tai Dialects: Glossaries, Texts, and Translations. Michigan Papers on South and Southeast Asia. Vol. 42. Ann Arbor, Michigan: Center for South and Southeast Asian Studies, University of Michigan. doi:10.3998/mpub.19533. ISBN 978-0-89148-074-7.
- Hudak, Thomas John, ed. (1995). William J. Gedney's Central Tai Dialects: Glossaries, Texts, and Translations. Michigan Papers on South and Southeast Asia. Vol. 43. Ann Arbor, Michigan: Center for South and Southeast Asian Studies, University of Michigan. doi:10.3998/mpub.19536. ISBN 978-0-89148-075-4.
- Hudak, Thomas John, ed. (1996). William J. Gedney's The Lue Language: Glossary, Texts, and Translations. Michigan Papers on South and Southeast Asia. Vol. 44. Ann Arbor, Michigan: Center for South and Southeast Asian Studies, University of Michigan. doi:10.3998/mpub.22829. ISBN 978-0-89148-076-1.
- Hudak, Thomas John, ed. (1997). William J. Gedney's Tai Dialect Studies: Glossaries, Texts, and Translations. Michigan Papers on South and Southeast Asia. Vol. 45. Ann Arbor, Michigan: Center for South and Southeast Asian Studies, University of Michigan. doi:10.3998/mpub.19326. ISBN 978-0-89148-077-8.
- Hudak, Thomas John, ed. (1997). William J. Gedney's Thai and Indic Literary Studies. Michigan Papers on South and Southeast Asia. Vol. 46. Ann Arbor, Michigan: Center for South and Southeast Asian Studies, University of Michigan. doi:10.3998/mpub.19331. ISBN 978-0-89148-080-8.
- Hudak, Thomas John (2004). "William J. Gedney's Elicitation Questionnaire". Journal of the American Oriental Society. 124 (3): 549–559. JSTOR 4132280.
- Hudak, Thomas John (2008). William J. Gedney's Comparative Tai Source Book. Oceanic Linguistics Special Publication No. 34. Honolulu: University of Hawaiʻi Press. JSTOR 20532978.
- Hudak, Thomas John (2010). William J. Gedney's Concise Saek-English, English-Saek Lexicon. Oceanic Linguistics Special Publication No. 37. Honolulu: University of Hawaiʻi Press. JSTOR 25822797.

=== Festschrifts ===
Four festschrifts were published in Gedney's honor:

- Gething, Thomas W., ed. (1975). A Tai Festschrift for William J. Gedney on the Occasion of his Fifth Cycle of Life Birthday Anniversary, April 4, 1975. Southeast Asian Studies Working Paper No. 8. Honolulu: University of Hawaiʻi Press.
- Harris, Jimmy G.; Chamberlain, James R., eds. (1975). Studies in Tai Linguistics in Honor of William J. Gedney. Bangkok: Central Institute of English Language, Office of State Universities.
- Bickner, Robert J.; Hudak, Thomas J.; Peyasantiwong, Patcharin, eds. (1986). Papers from a Conference on Thai Studies in Honor of William J. Gedney. Michigan Papers on South and Southeast Asia. Vol. 25. Ann Arbor, Michigan: Center for South and Southeast Asian Studies, University of Michigan.
- Compton, Carol J.; Hartmann, John F., eds. (1992). Papers on Tai Languages, Linguistics, and Literatures in Honor of William J. Gedney on his 77th Birthday. Occasional Paper No. 16. DeKalb, Illinois: Center for Southeast Asian Studies, Northern Illinois University.
