= Workshop on Structure and Constituency in Languages of the Americas =

Linguistics conference in Canada

The Workshop on Structure and Constituency in Languages of the Americas (WSCLA) is an annual linguistics conference that started in 1995. The main objective of WSCLA is to bring together linguists who are engaged in research on the formal study of the indigenous languages of the Americas.

== Purpose ==
WSCLA exists in order to exchange ideas across theories, language families, and scholars. It also aims to bridge the gap between the academic and non-academic communities who are involved in language maintenance and revitalization.

Indigenous linguist and McGill professor James Crippen, primary organizer of WSCLA 26, said about the conference:

WSCLA is a synthesis of two distinct fields of research of linguistics, one of which is research on the theory of human language… the universal human phenomenon of language and the fundamental organizing principles of human language, and the other field is specifically the research on indigenous languages of the Americas in general.

Papers and posters presented at WSCLA meetings are published by the University of British Columbia Working Papers in Linguistics (UBCWPL). The conference has been highlighted for its work on supporting indigenous research topics.

== Past conferences ==
WSCLA Conferences
Conference	Location
WSCLA 1	University of Manitoba
WSCLA 2	Brandon University
WSCLA 3	Saskatchewan Indian Federated College/University of Regina
WSCLA 4	University of British Columbia
WSCLA 5	University of Toronto
WSCLA 6	Memorial University of Newfoundland
WSCLA 7	University of Alberta
WSCLA 8	Brandon University
WSCLA 9	University of Victoria
WSCLA 10	University of Toronto
WSCLA 11	University of British Columbia
WSCLA 12	University of Lethbridge
WSCLA 13	Queen's University
WSCLA 14	Purdue University
WSCLA 15	University of Ottawa
WSCLA 16	University of Massachusetts Amherst
WSCLA 17	University of Chicago
WSCLA 18	University of California, Berkeley
WSCLA 19	Memorial University of Newfoundland
WSCLA 20	University of Arizona
WSCLA 21	Université du Québec à Montréal
WSCLA 22	University of British Columbia
WSCLA 23	University of Ottawa
WSCLA 24	University of Maryland, College Park
WSCLA 25	Sogang University
WSCLA 26	McGill University
WSCLA 27	University of Toronto

== See also ==
- Indigenous American languages
- Language revitalization
