= Western Conference on Linguistics =

Annual conference (established 1988)

The Western Conference on Linguistics, usually known as WECOL, is an annual conference held in the western part of the United States and Canada since 1988. Papers for presentation are chosen by a selection committee with the assistance of reports by referees. There is no restriction by topic, though the focus is theoretical and descriptive linguistics.

Papers presented at the conference are published by the Department of Linguistics at California State University, Fresno. The proceedings have been available on-line since 2004. WECOL is free and open to the public.

== Previous WECOLs ==
WECOL has been hosted at a number of locations since its establishment in 1988. However, since 2018, WECOL has been exclusively hosted by California State University in Fresno. Some years, such as 2009, no conference was held. WECOL has been hosted online using the platform Zoom since 2020.

No.	Year	Host
1	1988	University of British Columbia
2	1989	Arizona State University
3	1990	University of Texas, El Paso
4	1991	Simon Fraser University
5	1992	University of Arizona
6	1993	University of Washington
7	1994	University of California, Los Angeles
8	1995	University of Northern British Columbia
9	1996	University of California, Santa Cruz
11	1998	Arizona State University
12	1999	University of Texas, El Paso
13	2000	California State University, Fresno
14	2001	University of Washington
15	2002	University of British Columbia
16	2003	University of Arizona
17	2004	University of Southern California
19	2006	California State University, Fresno
20	2007	University of California, San Diego
21	2008	University of California, Davis
23	2010	California State University, Fresno
24	2011	Simon Fraser University
25	2013	Arizona State University
26	2017	Boise State University
27-	2018-	California State University, Fresno
