= International Conference on Sociolinguistics =

Academic conference

The International Conference on Sociolinguistics ("ICS") is a biennial academic conference in the field of sociolinguistics. Begun in 2016, the conference has met twice, with the third meeting scheduled for 2020.

== Meetings ==
- ICS.1 "Insights from Complexity, Superdiversity and Multimodality" was held 1 – 3 September, 2016, at Eötvös Loránd University;
- ICS.2 was held 6 – 8 September, 2018, at Eötvös Loránd University;
- ICS.3 "Diversities, New Media and Language Management", will be held 26 – 28 August, 2021, at Charles University
