= Formal Approaches to Slavic Linguistics =

The Annual Workshop on Formal Approaches to Slavic Linguistics (abbreviated FASL, pronounced [ˈfæsəl]) is one of the most reputable international academic conferences in the field of formal Slavic linguistics. Each meeting is hosted by a United States or Canada university in May. From the beginning through FASL 27, the proceedings were published by Michigan Slavic Publications of University of Michigan in Ann Arbor, MI. From FASL 28 on, the proceedings are published as an extra issue of Journal of Slavic Linguistics.

== Hosts and invited speakers ==
Fasl #	Year	Location	Invited Speakers
1	1992	University of Michigan	
2	1993	Massachusetts Institute of Technology	
3	1994	University of Maryland, College Park	
4	1995	Cornell University	
5	1996	Indiana University (Bloomington) & Wabash College	
6	1997	University of Connecticut	Christina Bethin, Howard Lasnik, Steven Franks
7	1998	University of Washington	
8	1999	University of Pennsylvania	Greville Corbett, Anthony Kroch, Draga Zec
9	2000	Indiana University (Bloomington)	Wayles Browne, Ljiljana Progovac
10	2001	University of Michigan	
11	2002	University of Massachusetts Amherst	Maria-Luisa Rivero, Yakov Testelets, Ellen Woolford
12	2003	University of Ottawa	Robert D. Borsley, John F. Bailyn, Helen Goodluck
13	2004	University of South Carolina	Leonard H. Babby, Christina Bethin, Roumyana Slabakova
14	2005	Princeton University	
15	2006	University of Toronto	Catherine Rudin, Željko Bošković
16	2007	State University of New York at Stony Brook	David Pesetsky, Maria Polinsky, Jerzy Rubach
17	2008	Yale University	Alexei Kochetov, Ljiljana Progovac, Draga Zec
18	2009	Cornell University	Barbara Citko, Molly Diesing, Jaye Padgett
19	2010	University of Maryland, College Park	Hana Filip, James Lavine, Juan Uriagereka
20	2011	Massachusetts Institute of Technology	Ivona Kučerová, Donca Steriade, Sergei Tatevosov, Morris Halle
21	2012	Indiana University, Bloomington	Željko Bošković, Guglielmo Cinque and Iliana Krapova, Damir Cavar, Tania Ionin
22	2013	McMaster University	Maria Gouskova, Roumyana Pancheva, David Pesetsky
23	2014	University of California, Berkeley	Barbara Citko, Greville Corbett, Johanna Nichols, Jerzy Rubach
24	2015	New York University	Morphology Workshop: Vera Gribanova, Ora Matushansky, Katya Pertsova; Main sessions: John Frederick Bailyn, Christina Bethin, Maria Polinsky
25	2016	Cornell University	Michael Becker, Gaja Jarosz, Catherine Rudin
26	2017	University of Illinois at Urbana-Champaign	Stephanie Harves, Darya Kavitskaya, Alexandra Perovic, Irina Sekerina, Natalia Slioussar
27	2018	Stanford University	Maria Gouskova, Ivona Kučerová, Roumyana Pancheva
28	2019	Stony Brook University	Draga Zec, Greville Corbett, Steven Franks
29	2020	University of Washington	Peter Jurgec, Asya Pereltsvaig, Ljiljana Progovac
30	2021	Massachusetts Institute of Technology	Paulina Lyskawa, Ekaterina Lyutikova, Radek Šimík, Aida Talić
31	2022	McMaster University	John Frederick Bailyn, Tanya Bondarenko, Veno Volenec, Neda Todorović
32	2023	Indiana University	Ksenia Zanon, Darya Kavitskaya, Adrian Stegovec, Adam Przepiórkowski
