= Moscow Student Conference on Linguistics =

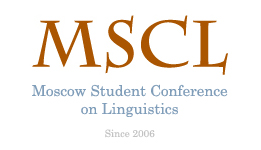
Moscow Student Conference on Linguistics (MSCL)

The Moscow Student Conference on Linguistics (MSCL) is an annual student linguistic conference, which started in 2006. It was first held at the Moscow State University, and since then it has grown to be one of the major conferences on formal linguistics in Russia. The aim of the conference is to give young researchers an opportunity to present their work, exchange ideas and receive feedback from more experienced colleagues.

Talks are solicited from all areas of theoretical linguistics including Phonology, Morphology, Syntax and Semantics. Only abstracts from students (i.e., those not having defended a PhD by the submission deadline) are considered.

MSCL often has a key topic (e.g. Perspectives on the Syntax-Semantics Interface in 2008, Scrambling, Free Word Order and Related Phenomena in 2010). Abstracts on the announced key topic are especially encouraged, though other abstracts are given equal consideration.

== MSCL Series ==
- MSCL 1 - Moscow State University, April 14, 2006
- MSCL 2 - Moscow State University, April 13, 2007
- MSCL 3 - Moscow State University, April 17–18, 2008
- MSCL 4 - Moscow State University, April 15, 2009
- MSCL 5 - Independent University of Moscow, April 3–4, 2010

== See also ==
- List of linguistics conferences
