= International Congress of Linguists =

The International Congress of Linguists (ICL) takes place every five years, under the governance of the Permanent International Committee of Linguists (PICL) / Comité International Permanent des Linguistes (CIPL). The 19th ICL was held in Geneva, Switzerland in 2013. The 20th ICL was held in Cape Town, South Africa from 2–6 July 2018 on the topic of "The Diversity of Language". The next (21st) ICL was originally planned to take place in Kazan (Tatarstan), Russia) from 25 June to 2 July 2023. However, due to the Russian invasion of Ukraine, the venue was changed and the Congress moved by one year. It took place in Poznań, Poland at the Adam Mickiewicz University, 8–14 September 2024.

The next, 22nd Congress will be held on 23–29 July 2028 in Leiden, Netherlands as a centenary of CIPL. The proposed title is World of Languages.

== History and successive venues ==
The ICL was started in April 1928 in The Hague, where it organized its first edition, and subsequent editions have been held in cities such as Geneva in 1931, Rome in 1933 and Copenhagen in 1936. The first congress has been read as marking an intellectual split of the emergent discipline of linguistics from traditional philology, though in 1952, the seventh congress was held in London, hosted by the Philological Society. A more recent congress took place in Paris in 1997.

The 18th International Congress of Linguists took place in 2008 in the city of Seoul, South Korea.

The Swiss Linguistics Society (SSG) proposed that the 19th congress would be organized in Ferdinand de Saussure’s city Geneva, one century after he died, to commemorate his important contributions to the field of linguistics. The events took place from July 21 to July 27, 2013. The 19th ICL was about the language-cognition interface, a topic of cognitive linguistics based on the foundational work of Ferdinand de Saussure, a Swiss linguist who is widely considered one of the fathers of 20th-century linguistics. During the Congress, several sessions were held about major aspects of linguistics, including the origin of language, phonology, morphology, syntax, semantics, pragmatics, psycholinguistics, and sociolinguistics.

=== List ===
#	Year	Date	City	Country	Note
1	1928	04	The Hague	Netherlands	
2	1931		Geneva	Switzerland	
3	1933		Rome	Italy	
4	1936		Copenhagen	Denmark	
4)	1939)		Brussels)	Belgium)	cancelled because of World War II
5	1948		Paris	France	after WW2
7	1952		London	United Kingdom	
8	1957		Oslo	Norway	
9	1962		Cambridge, Mass.	USA	
10	1967		Bucharest	Romania	
11	1972		Bologna	Italy	
12	1977		Vienna	Austria	
13	1982		Tokyo	Japan	
14	1987		Berlin	Germany	
15	1992		?, Quebec	Canada	
16	1997		Paris	France	
17	2003		Prague	Czech Republic	
18	2008		Seoul	South Korea	
19	2013	07-21–27	Geneva	Switzerland	
20	2018	07-02–06	Capetown	South Africa	
20)	2023)	06-25 – 07-02	Kazan (Tatarstan)	Russia	cancelled as Russia invaded Ukraine
21	2024	09-08–14	Poznań	Poland	
22	2028	07-23–29	Leiden	Netherlands	planned

== See also ==
- List of linguistics conferences
