= North East Indian Linguistics Society =

Linguistics society in Assam, India

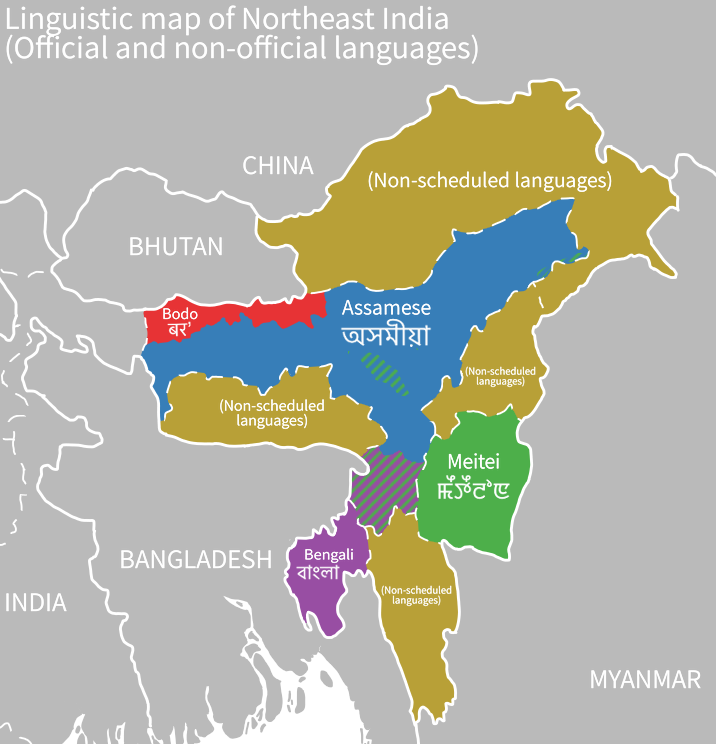
- "Scheduled" and "non-scheduled" official languages of Northeast Indian states
- Nickname: NEILS
- Formation: 2005
- Founder: Jyotiprakash Tamuli, Stephen Morey, and Mark W. Post
- Founded at: Gauhati University
- Location: India
- Origins: Guwahati, Assam, India
- Fields: Linguistics
- Official language: English
- Key people: Stephen Morey, Mark W. Post
- Website: neils.org.in

The North East Indian Linguistics Society (NEILS) is a linguistics society that focuses on the languages and linguistics of Northeast India. NEILS focuses primarily on the Tibeto-Burman languages of the region, as well as the Khasian languages and some Indo-Aryan languages.

== History ==
In 2005, the North East Indian Linguistics Society (NEILS) was founded by Jyotiprakash Tamuli (Gauhati University), Stephen Morey (La Trobe University), and Mark W. Post (currently at the University of Sydney).

== Conferences ==
From 2007 to 2012, NEILS conferences were held annually, and then afterwards biannually starting from 2014. The conferences are usually held in Assam during the months of January or February.

The first NEILS meeting was held at the Phanidar Dutta Seminar Hall at Gauhati University from 6–7 February 2006. Subsequently, most conferences were held at the Don Bosco Institute (Don Bosco College of Engineering & Technology), Guwahati. Regular attendees have included Robbins Burling, Scott DeLancey, George van Driem, Gwendolyn Hyslop, and other linguists.

Conference	Location	Date	Year	Proceedings
NEILS 1	Gauhati University	6–7 February	2006	
NEILS 2	Don Bosco Institute, Guwahati	5–9 February	2007	
NEILS 3	Don Bosco Institute, Guwahati	18–22 January	2008	
NEILS 4	North Eastern Hill University	16–18 January	2009	
NEILS 5	Gauhati University	12–14 February	2010	
NEILS 6	Tezpur University	31 January – 2 February	2011	
NEILS 7	Don Bosco Institute, Guwahati	2–4 February	2012	
NEILS 8	Don Bosco Institute, Guwahati	31 January – 2 February	2014	
NEILS 9	Tezpur University	5–7 February	2016	
NEILS 10	Assam University, Silchar	29–31 January	2018	
NEILS 11	Central Institute of Technology, Kokrajhar	7–9 February	2020	
NEILS 12	Gauhati University	3–5 February	2023	
NEILS 13	Nagaland University, Kohima	6–8 February	2025	
