= Linguistic Society of the Philippines =

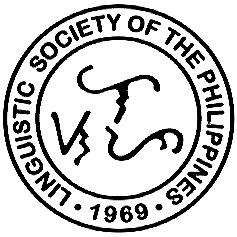
- Official logo
- Formation: 1969; 57 years ago
- Type: Scientific institute
- Purpose: Research in Philippine languages, linguistics and language education
- Headquarters: De La Salle University, Manila, Philippines
- Key people: Bonifacio P. Sibayan (co-founder); Ernesto Constantino (co-founder)
- Parent organization: Philippine Social Science Council
- Affiliations: SIL International
- Website: (in English)

The Linguistic Society of the Philippines, Inc. (or LSP) is a learned society for linguists and language educators based in Manila, Philippines. It was founded in 1969 primarily to rally for increased domestic research work on Philippine languages. The organization currently hosts and co-hosts local and international conferences and three memorial lectures. The LSP also publishes its own international peer-reviewed scholarly journal entitled the Philippine Journal of Linguistics (PJL).

Among notable people involved with the organization were linguists R. David Zorc and Lawrence A. Reid and former Department of Education, Culture and Sports secretary Andrew Gonzalez. For years, the LSP has also been an active partner of SIL International, known publisher of the Ethnologue.

== History ==
The organization was the brainchild of Dr. Bonifacio Sibayan of the Philippine Normal College (now a university) and Dr. Ernesto Constantino of the University of the Philippines, two linguists who were working on their respective research projects in the Pacific and Asian Languages Institute of the University of Hawaiʻi in 1968. Far away from home and very conscious of the linguistic work going on in the US, they had several discussions on the need for an organization of linguists that would do research and write on Philippine languages. The Linguistic Society of the Philippines (popularly known as the LSP) was formally organized in school year 1969-1970, with Teodoro Llamzon (Ateneo de Manila) as president, Bonifacio Sibayan (PNC) as vice-president, Edilberto Dagot (PNC) as secretary, and Fe Otanes (PNC) as treasurer.

Several LSP members appeared before the Constitutional Convention of 1971 and again before the Constitutional Commission in 1986 to discuss the national language issue. The LSP was also involved in the formulation of the Bilingual Education Policy in 1974 and conducted a formal evaluation of its implementation for the period 1974 to 1985; based on the results of that evaluation, the Policy was revised in 1987.

== Conference Hosting ==
The Linguistic Society of the Philippines International Conference (LSPIC) is the international academic conference series of the LSP held annually. The first LSPIC was held from 7 to 9 March 2019 at De La Salle University as part of the society’s 50th anniversary.

Subsequent editions have been held in different locations and formats:

- LSPIC 2020 - Dakak Park and Beach Resort in Dapitan City
- LSPIC 2022 - held jointly with the English in Southeast Asia International Conference in a wholly digital format
- LSPIC 2023 - Mindanao State University–Iligan Institute of Technology
- LSPIC 2024 - Isabela State University Cauayan Campus
- LSPIC 2025 - Pangasinan State University–Lingayen Campus
- LSPIC 2026 - West Visayas State University, Iloilo City

The conference serves as a venue for research in linguistics, language, and language education, including Philippine linguistics, sociolinguistics, multilingualism, language policy, corpus linguistics, and related areas.

== Organization ==
The LSP is handled by a group of elected scholars and academicians from various institutions in the Philippines.

== Officers (Present to Founding) ==
2026–2027
| Position | Name | Institution Affiliation |
|---|---|---|
| President | Rachelle Ballesteros-Lintao | University of Santo Tomas |
| Vice-President | Aireen Barrios-Arnuco | De La Salle University |
| Secretary | Rafael Michael O. Paz | Polytechnic University of the Philippines |
| Treasurer | Elineth Elizabeth L. Suarez | Ateneo de Manila University |
| Immediate Past President | Aldrin P. Lee | University of the Philippines Diliman |
| Position | Name | Institution Affiliation |
| Director of Membership | Robin A. Delos Reyes | Ateneo de Zamboanga University |
| Director of Research and Special Projects | Ryn Jean Fe. V. Gonzales | SIL International |
| Director of Public Relations and Linkages | Boyet L. Batang | Isabela State University |
| Director of Publications | Rodney C. Jubilado | University of Hawaiʻi at Hilo |
| Director of Conferences | Honeylet E. Dumoran | Mindanao State University–Iligan Institute of Technology |
| Director of Professional Meetings | Philip Adrianne A. Rentillo | De La Salle University |
| Director of Training | Vincent Christopher A. Santiago | University of the Philippines–Diliman |
| Board of Advisors | Emma C. Castillo | Philippine Normal University |
| | Jesus Federico C. Hernandez | University of the Philippines–Diliman |
| | Marilu R. Madrunio | University of Santo Tomas |
| | Isabel P. Martin | Ateneo de Manila University |
| | Anna Maria Gloria S. Ward | University of Santo Tomas |

2025–2026
| Position | Name | Institution Affiliation |
|---|---|---|
| President | Rachelle Ballesteros-Lintao | University of Santo Tomas |
| Vice-President | Aireen Barrios-Arnuco | De La Salle University |
| Secretary | Rafael Michael O. Paz | Polytechnic University of the Philippines |
| Treasurer | Elineth Elizabeth L. Suarez | Ateneo de Manila University |
| Immediate Past President | Aldrin P. Lee | University of the Philippines Diliman |
| Position | Name | Institution Affiliation |
| Director of Membership | Robin A. Delos Reyes | Ateneo de Zamboanga University |
| Director of Research and Special Projects | Ryn Jean Fe. V. Gonzales | SIL International |
| Director of Public Relations and Linkages | Boyet L. Batang | Isabela State University |
| Director of Publications | Rodney C. Jubilado | University of Hawaiʻi at Hilo |
| Director of Conferences | Honeylet E. Dumoran | Mindanao State University–Iligan Institute of Technology |
| Director of Professional Meetings | Shirley N. Dita | De La Salle University |
| Director of Training | Vincent Christopher A. Santiago | University of the Philippines–Diliman |
| Board of Advisors | Emma C. Castillo | Philippine Normal University |
| | Jesus Federico C. Hernandez | University of the Philippines–Diliman |
| | Marilu R. Madrunio | University of Santo Tomas |
| | Isabel P. Martin | Ateneo de Manila University |
| | Anna Maria Gloria S. Ward | University of Santo Tomas |

2024–2025
| Position | Name | Institution Affiliation |
|---|---|---|
| President | Rachelle Ballesteros-Lintao | University of Santo Tomas |
| Vice-President | Aireen Barrios-Arnuco | De La Salle University |
| Secretary | Rafael Michael O. Paz | Polytechnic University of the Philippines |
| Treasurer | Elineth Elizabeth L. Suarez | Ateneo de Manila University |
| Immediate Past President | Aldrin P. Lee | University of the Philippines Diliman |
| Position | Name | Institution Affiliation |
| Director of Membership | Honeylet E. Dumoran | Mindanao State University–Iligan Institute of Technology |
| Director of Research and Special Projects | Ryn Jean Fe. V. Gonzales | SIL International |
| Director of Public Relations and Linkages | Robin A. Delos Reyes | Ateneo de Zamboanga University |
| Director of Publications | Rodney C. Jubilado | University of Hawaiʻi at Hilo |
| Director of Conferences | Boyet L. Batang | Isabela State University |
| Director of Professional Meetings | Shirley N. Dita | De La Salle University |
| Director of Training | Vincent Christopher A. Santiago | University of the Philippines–Diliman |
| Board of Advisors | Emma C. Castillo | Philippine Normal University |
| | Jesus Federico C. Hernandez | University of the Philippines–Diliman |
| | Marilu R. Madrunio | University of Santo Tomas |
| | Isabel P. Martin | Ateneo de Manila University |
| | Anna Maria Gloria S. Ward | University of Santo Tomas |

2021-2024
| Position | Name | Institution Affiliation |
|---|---|---|
| Position | Name | Institution Affiliation |
| President | Aldrin P. Lee | University of the Philippines-Diliman |
| Vice-President | Rachelle Ballesteros-Lintao | University of Santo Tomas |
| Secretary | Aireen Barrios-Arnuco | De La Salle University |
| Treasurers | Dennis H. Pulido | Far Eastern University |
| | Elineth Elizabeth L. Suarez | Ateneo De Manila University |
| Immediate Past President | Alejandro S. Bernardo | University of Santo Tomas |
| Position | Name | Institution Affiliation |
| Directors of Membership | Elineth Elizabeth L. Suarez | Ateneo De Manila University |
| | Chenee M. Dino-Aparicio | Far Eastern University |
| Director of Research and Special Projects | Ryn Jean Fe. V. Gonzales | SIL International |
| Directorsof Public Relations and Linkages | Cecilia F. Genuino | Philippine Normal University |
| | Robin A. Delos Reyes | Ateneo de Zamboanga University |
| Directors of Publications | Leah Gustilo | De La Salle University |
| | Rodney C. Jubilado | University of Hawai'I at Hilo |
| Directors of Conferences | Chenee M. Dino-Aparicio | Far Eastern University |
| | Rodney C. Jubilado | University of Hawai'I at Hilo |
| | Boyet L. Batang | Isabela State University |
| Director of Professional Meetings | Shirley N. Dita | De La Salle University |
| Directors of Training | Rodney C. Jubilado | University of Hawai'I at Hilo |
| | Chenee M. Dino-Aparicio | Far Eastern University |
| | Honeylet E. Dumoran | Mindanao State University-Iligan Institute of Technology |
| Board of Advisors | Emma C. Castillo | Philippine Normal University |
| | Jesus Federico C. Hernandez | University of the Philippines-Diliman |
| | Marilu R. Madrunio | University of Santo Tomas |
| | Isabel P. Martin | Ateneo de Manila University |
| | Anna Maria Gloria S. Ward | University of Santo Tomas |

2018-2021
| Position | Name | Institution Affiliation |
|---|---|---|
| Position | Name | Institution Affiliation |
| President | Alejandro S. Bernardo | University of Santo Tomas |
| Vice-President | Leah E. Gustilo | De La Salle University |
| Secretary | Priscilla Angela T. Cruz | Ateneo de Manila University |
| Treasurer | Rachelle Ballesteros-Lintao | University of Santo Tomas |
| Immediate Past President | Shirley N. Dita | De La Salle University |
| BOARD OF DIRECTORS | | |
| Position | Name | Institution Affiliation |
| Director for Membership | Dennis H. Pulido | Far Eastern University |
| Director of Research and Special Projects | Tammy L. Ruch | SIL International |
| Director of Public Relations and Linkages | Arceli M. Amarles | Philippine Normal University |
| Director for Publications | Michael C.L. Tanangkingsing | National Taipei University of Technology |
| Director for Conferences | Aldrin P. Lee | University of the Philippines Diliman |
| Director for Professional Meetings | Eden R. Flores | De La Salle University |
| Director for Training | Jesus Federico C. Hernandez | University of the Philippines Diliman |
| Board of Advisors | Emma C. Castillo | Philippine Normal University |
| | Resty M. Cena | University of Alberta |
| | Marilu R. Madrunio | University of Sto. Tomas |
| | Isabel P. Martin | Ateneo de Manila University |
| | Anna Maria Gloria S. Ward | University of Sto. Tomas |

2017-2018
| Position | Name | Institution Affiliation |
|---|---|---|
| Position | Name | Institution Affiliation |
| President | Shirley N. Dita | De La Salle University |
| Vice-President | Alejandro S. Bernardo | University of Santo Tomas |
| Secretary | Arceli M. Amarles | Philippine Normal University |
| Treasurer | Camilla J. Vizconde | University of Santo Tomas |
| Immediate Past President | Rochelle Irene G. Lucas | De La Salle University |
| BOARD OF DIRECTORS | | |
| Position | Name | Institution Affiliation |
| Director of Membership | Priscilla T. Cruz | Ateneo de Manila University |
| Director of Research and Special Projects | Marlina L. Lino | Mariano Marcos State University |
| Director of Public Relations and Linkages | Jesus Federico C. Hernandez | University of the Philippines - Diliman |
| Director of Publications | Leah E. Gustilo | De La Salle University |
| Director of Conferences | Dennis H. Pulido | Far Eastern University |
| Director of Professional Meetings | Eden R. Flores | De La Salle University |
| Director of Training | Tammy B. Ruch | SIL International |
| Board of Advisors | Ma. Lourdes S. Bautista | De La Salle University |
| | Emma S. Castillo | Philippine Normal University |
| | Marilu Rañosa Madrunio | University of Santo Tomas |
| | Isabel P. Martin | Ateneo de Manila University |
| | J. Stephen Quakenbush | SIL International |

2016-2017
| Position | Name | Institution Affiliation |
|---|---|---|
| Position | Name | Institution Affiliation |
| President | Shirley N. Dita | De La Salle University |
| Vice-President | Arwin M. Vibar | University of Asia and the Pacific |
| Secretary | Marianne Rachel G. Perfecto | Ateneo de Manila University |
| Treasurer | Camilla J. Vizconde | University of Santo Tomas |
| Immediate Past President | Rochelle Irene G. Lucas | De La Salle University |
| BOARD OF DIRECTORS | | |
| Position | Name | Institution Affiliation |
| Director of Membership | Arceli M. Amarles | Philippine Normal University |
| Director of Research and Special Projects | Marlina L. Lino | Mariano Marcos State University |
| Director of Public Relations and Linkages | Alejandro S. Bernardo | University of Santo Tomas |
| Director of Publications | Priscilla T. Cruz | Ateneo de Manila University |
| Director of Conferences | Jesus Federico C. Hernandez | University of the Philippines |
| Director of Professional Meetings | Sterling M. Plata | De La Salle University |
| Director of Training | Jason T. Griffiths | SIL International |
| Board of Advisors | Ma. Lourdes S. Bautista | De La Salle University |
| | Emma S. Castillo | Philippine Normal University |
| | Marilu Rañosa Madrunio | University of Santo Tomas |
| | Isabel P. Martin | Ateneo de Manila University |
| | J. Stephen Quakenbush | SIL International |

2015-2016
| Position | Name | Institution Affiliation |
|---|---|---|
| Position | Name | Institution Affiliation |
| President | Shirley N. Dita | De La Salle University |
| Vice-President | Arwin M. Vibar | University of Asia and the Pacific |
| Secretary | Marianne Rachel G. Perfecto | Ateneo de Manila University |
| Treasurer | Camilla J. Vizconde | University of Santo Tomas |
| Immediate Past President | Rochelle Irene G. Lucas | De La Salle University |
| BOARD OF DIRECTORS | | |
| Position | Name | Institution Affiliation |
| Director of Membership | Arceli M. Amarles | Philippine Normal University |
| Director of Research and Special Projects | Marlina L. Lino | Mariano Marcos State University |
| Director of Public Relations and Linkages | Ma. Milagros C. Laurel | University of the Philippines - Diliman |
| Director of Publications | Priscilla T. Cruz | Ateneo de Manila University |
| Director of Conferences | Alejandro S. Bernardo | University of Santo Tomas |
| Director of Professional Meetings | Paulina M. Gocheco | De La Salle University |
| Director of Training | Jason T. Griffiths | SIL International |
| Board of Advisors | Ma. Lourdes S. Bautista | De La Salle University |
| | Emma S. Castillo | Philippine Normal University |
| | Marilu Rañosa Madrunio | University of Santo Tomas |
| | Isabel P. Martin | Ateneo de Manila University |
| | J. Stephen Quakenbush | SIL International |

2012 - 2015
| Position | Name | Institution Affiliation |
|---|---|---|
| President | Rochelle Irene Lucas | De La Salle University |
| Vice-President | Shirley N. Dita | De La Salle University |
| Secretary | Marianne Rachel Perfecto | Ateneo de Manila University |
| Treasurer | Camille Vizconde | University of Santo Tomas |
| Board Members | Isabel Martin | University of Santo Tomas |
| | Ruanni Tupas | Ateneo de Manila University |
| | Arwin Vibar | University of the Philippines |
| | Edwardo Bolanos | De La Salle University |
| | Danilo Dayag | De La Salle University |
| | Glenn Stallsmith | Summer Institute of Linguistics |
| | Jason Griffiths | Summer Institute of Linguistics |
| | Milagros Laurel | University of the Philippines |
| Immediate Past President | Marilu Madrunio | University of Asia and the Pacific |

2010 - 2012
| Position | Name | Institution Affiliation |
|---|---|---|
| President | Marilu Rañosa Madrunio | University of Santo Tomas |
| Vice-President | Rochelle Irene G. Lucas | De La Salle University |
| Secretary | Shirley N. Dita | De La Salle University |
| Treasurer | Anna Maria Gloria S. Ward | University of Santo Tomas |
| P.R.O | T. Ruanni F. Tupas | National University of Singapore |
| Board of Directors | Eden Regala-Flores | De La Salle University |
| | Glenn Stallsmith | SIL International |
| Immediate Past President | Danilo T. Dayag | De La Salle University |

2009-2010
| Position | Name | Institution Affiliation |
|---|---|---|
| President | Danilo T. Dayag | De La Salle University |
| Vice-President | Marilu Rañosa Madrunio | University of Santo Tomas |
| Secretary | Rochelle Irene G. Lucas | De La Salle University |
| Treasurer | Anna Maria Gloria S. Ward | University of Santo Tomas |
| P.R.O | Carolina A. Nuñez | Ateneo de Manila University |
| Board Members | Camilla J. Visconde | University of Sto. Tomas |
| | Ma. Milagros C. Laurel | University of the Philippines-Diliman |
| | Isabel P. Martin | Ateneo de Manila University |
| | Sue McQuay | Summer Institute of Linguistics |
| | Alice B. Adeva | University of the Philippines - Manila |
| | Ricardo Ma. D. Nolasco | University of the Philippines - Diliman |
| | Ma. Antoinette C. Montealegre | Philippine Normal University |
| | Ruth A. Alido | Philippine Normal University |
| Immediate Past President | Isabel P. Martin | Ateneo de Manila University |

2008 - 2009
| Position | Name | Institution Affiliation |
|---|---|---|
| President | Danilo T. Dayag | De La Salle University |
| Vice-President | Marilu Rañosa Madrunio | University of Santo Tomas |
| Secretary | Sydney G. Villegas | De La Salle University |
| Treasurer | Anna Maria Gloria S. Ward | University of Santo Tomas |
| P.R.O | Carolina A. Nuñez | Ateneo de Manila University |
| Board Members | Isabel P. Martin | Ateneo de Manila University |
| | Sue McQuay | Summer Institute of Linguistics |
| | Alice B. Adeva | University of the Philippines - Manila |
| | Ricardo Ma. D. Nolasco | University of the Philippines - Diliman |
| | Ma. Antoinette C. Montealegre | Philippine Normal University |
| | Ruth A. Alido | Philippine Normal University |
| Immediate Past President | Isabel P. Martin | Ateneo de Manila University |

2006 - 2008
| Position | Name | Institution Affiliation |
|---|---|---|
| President | Isabel P. Martin | Ateneo de Manila University |
| Vice-President | Danilo T. Dayag | De La Salle University |
| Secretary | Anna Maria Gloria S. Ward | University of Santo Tomas |
| Treasurer | Marilu Rañosa Madrunio | University of Santo Tomas |
| Board Members | J. Stephen Quakenbush | Summer Institute of Linguistics |
| | Emma S. Castillo | Philippine Normal University |
| | Alice B. Adeva | University of the Philippines - Manila |
| | Gina S. Salazar | University of the Philippines - Manila |
| | Ricardo Ma. D. Nolasco | University of the Philippines - Diliman |
| | Ma. Antoinette C. Montealegre | Philippine Normal University |
| | Mildred Rojo-Laurilla | De La Salle University |

2004- 2006
| Position | Name | Institution Affiliation |
|---|---|---|
| President | Angela P. Sarile | University of the Philippines - Manila |
| Vice-President | Isabel P. Martin | Ateneo de Manila University |
| Executive Secretary | Emma S. Castillo | Philippine Normal University |
| Treasurer | Edilberta C. Bala | Philippine Normal University |
| Board Members | Ma. Lourdes S. Bautista | De La Salle University |
| | Danilo T. Dayag | De La Salle University |
| | J. Stephen Quakenbush | Summer Institute of Linguistics |
| | Andrew B. Gonzales, FSC | De La Salle University |
| | Emy M. Pascasio | Ateneo de Manila University |
| | Ma. Clara V. Ravina | University of the Philippines - Diliman |
| | Anna Maria Gloria S. Ward | University of Santo Tomas |
| President Emeritus | Bonifacio P. Sibayan | Philippine Normal University |

2003-2004
| Position | Name | Institution Affiliation |
|---|---|---|
| President | Angela P. Sarile | University of the Philippines - Manila |
| Vice-President | Isabel P. Martin | Ateneo de Manila University |
| Executive Secretary | Emma S. Castillo | Philippine Normal University |
| Treasurer | Edilberta C. Bala | Philippine Normal University |
| Board Members | Ma. Lourdes S. Bautista | De La Salle University |
| | Danilo T. Dayag | De La Salle University |
| | P. Gregory Dekker | Summer Institute of Linguistics |
| | Andrew B. Gonzales, FSC | De La Salle University |
| | Emy M. Pascasio | Ateneo de Manila University |
| | Ma. Clara V. Ravina | University of the Philippines - Diliman |
| | Anna Maria Gloria S. Ward | University of Santo Tomas |
| President Emeritus | Bonifacio P. Sibayan | Philippine Normal University |

2001-2002
| Position | Name | Institution Affiliation |
|---|---|---|
| President | Anna Maria Gloria S. Ward | University of Santo Tomas |
| Vice-President | Angela P. Sarile | University of the Philippines - Manila |
| Executive Secretary | Emma S. Castillo | Philippine Normal University |
| Treasurer | Ma. Clara V. Ravina | University of the Philippines - Diliman |
| Board Members | Edilberta C. Bala | Philippine Normal University |
| | Ma. Lourdes S. Bautista | De La Salle University |
| | Andrew B. Gonzales, FSC | De La Salle University |
| | Isabel P. Martin | Ateneo de Manila University |
| | Emy M. Pascasio | Ateneo de Manila University |
| | P. Gregory Dekker | Summer Institute of Linguistics |
| President Emeritus | Bonifacio P. Sibayan | Philippine Normal University |

2000 - 2001
| Position | Name | Institution Affiliation |
|---|---|---|
| President | Anna Maria Gloria S. Ward | University of Santo Tomas |
| Vice-President | Angela P. Sarile | University of the Philippines - Manila |
| Executive Secretary | Emma S. Castillo | Philippine Normal University |
| Treasurer | Ma. Clara V. Ravina | University of the Philippines - Diliman |
| Board Members | Edilberta C. Bala | Philippine Normal University |
| | Ma. Lourdes S. Bautista | De La Salle University |
| | Andrew B. Gonzales, FSC | De La Salle University |
| | Isabel P. Martin | Ateneo de Manila University |
| | Emy M. Pascasio | Ateneo de Manila University |
| | J. Stephen Quakenbush | Summer Institute of Linguistics |
| President Emeritus | Bonifacio P. Sibayan | Philippine Normal University |

1999 - 2000
| Position | Name | Institution Affiliation |
|---|---|---|
| President | Emy M. Pascasio | Ateneo de Manila University |
| Vice-President | Anna Maria Gloria S. Ward | University of Santo Tomas |
| Executive Secretary | Emma S. Castillo | Philippine Normal University |
| Treasurer | Ma. Clara V. Ravina | University of the Philippines - Diliman |
| Board Members | Edilberta C. Bala | Philippine Normal University |
| | Ma. Lourdes S. Bautista | De La Salle University |
| | Andrew B. Gonzales, FSC | De La Salle University |
| | Isabel P. Martin | Ateneo de Manila University |
| | J. Stephen Quakenbush | Summer Institute of Linguistics |
| | Angela P. Sarile | University of the Philippines - Manila |
| President Emeritus | Bonifacio P. Sibayan | Philippine Normal University |

1998 - 1999
| Position | Name | Institution Affiliation |
|---|---|---|
| President | Emy M. Pascasio | Ateneo de Manila University |
| Vice-President | Anna Maria Gloria S. Ward | University of Santo Tomas |
| Executive Secretary | Emma S. Castillo | Philippine Normal University |
| Treasurer | Ma. Clara V. Ravina | University of the Philippines - Diliman |
| Board Members | Wilfredo L. Alberca | Polytechnic University of the Philippines |
| | Edilberta C. Bala | Philippine Normal University |
| | Ma. Lourdes S. Bautista | De La Salle University |
| | Andrew B. Gonzales, FSC | De La Salle University |
| | Ponciano B.P. Pineda | Institute of National Language |
| | J. Stephen Quakenbush | Summer Institute of Linguistics |
| | T. Ruanni F. Tupas | National University of Singapore |
| President Emeritus | Bonifacio P. Sibayan | Philippine Normal University |

1997 - 1998
| Position | Name | Institution Affiliation |
|---|---|---|
| President | Edilberta C. Bala | Philippine Normal University |
| Vice-President | Emy M. Pascasio | Ateneo de Manila University |
| Executive Secretary | Emma S. Castillo | Philippine Normal University |
| Treasurer | Anna Maria Gloria S. Ward | University of Santo Tomas |
| Board Members | Wilfredo L. Alberca | Polytechnic University of the Philippines |
| | Ma. Lourdes S. Bautista | De La Salle University |
| | Andrew B. Gonzales, FSC | De La Salle University |
| | Araceli Hidalgo | University of the Philippines |
| | Ponciano B.P. Pineda | Institute of National Language |
| | Ma. Clara V. Ravina | University of the Philippines |
| | J. Stephen Quakenbush | Summer Institute of Linguistics |
| President Emeritus | Bonifacio P. Sibayan | Philippine Normal University |

1996 - 1997
| Position | Name | Institution Affiliation |
|---|---|---|
| President | Ma. Lourdes S. Bautista | De La Salle University |
| Vice-President | Edilberta C. Bala | Philippine Normal University |
| Executive Secretary | Emma S. Castillo | Philippine Normal University |
| Treasurer | Emy M. Pascasio | Ateneo de Manila University |
| Board Members | Wilfredo L. Alberca | Polytechnic University of the Philippines |
| | Andrew B. Gonzales, FSC | De La Salle University |
| | Araceli Hidalgo | University of the Philippines |
| | Ponciano B.P. Pineda | Institute of National Language |
| | Ma. Clara V. Ravina | University of the Philippines |
| | Anna Maria Gloria Ward | University of Santo Tomas |

1995 - 1996
| Position | Name | Institution Affiliation |
|---|---|---|
| President | Araceli Hidalgo | University of the Philippines |
| Vice-President | Ma. Lourdes S. Bautista | De La Salle University |
| Executive Secretary | Emma S. Castillo | Philippine Normal University |
| Treasurer | Emy M. Pascasio | Ateneo de Manila University |
| Board Members | Wilfredo L. Alberca | Polytechnic University of the Philippines |
| | Teresita Cendaña | University of Santo Tomas |
| | Andrew B. Gonzales, FSC | De La Salle University |
| | Scott McGregor | Summer Institute of Linguistics |
| | Ponciano B.P. Pineda | Institute of National Language |
| | Ma. Clara V. Ravina | University of the Philippines |

1994 - 1995
| Position | Name | Institution Affiliation |
|---|---|---|
| President | Emy M. Pascasio | Ateneo de Manila University |
| Vice-President | Araceli Hidalgo | University of the Philippines |
| Executive Secretary | Emma S. Castillo | Philippine Normal University |
| Treasurer | Teresita Cendaña | University of Santo Tomas |
| Board Members | Ma. Clara V. Ravina | University of the Philippines |
| | Ponciano B.P. Pineda | Institute of National Language |
| | Scott McGregor | Summer Institute of Linguistics |
| | Wilfredo Alberca | Polytechnic University of the Philippines |
| | Andrew B. Gonzales, F.S.C. | De La Salle University |
| President Emeritus | Bonifacio P. Sibayan | Philippine Normal University |

1993 - 1994
| Position | Name | Institution Affiliation |
|---|---|---|
| President | Emy M. Pascasio | Ateneo de Manila University |
| Vice-President | Araceli Hidalgo | University of the Philippines |
| Executive Secretary | Emma S. Castillo | Philippine Normal University |
| Treasurer | Teresita Cendaña | University of Santo Tomas |
| Board Members | Ma. Clara V. Ravina | University of the Philippines |
| | Wilfredo Alberca | Polytechnic University of the Philippines |
| | Andrew B. Gonzales, F.S.C. | De La Salle University |
| | Ponciano B.P. Pineda | Institute of National Language |
| | Richard Roe | Summer Institute of Linguistics |
| President Emeritus | Bonifacio P. Sibayan | Philippine Normal University |

1992-1993
| Position | Name | Institution Affiliation |
|---|---|---|
| President | Emma S. Castillo | Philippine Normal University |
| Vice-President | Ma. Clara V. Ravina | University of the Philippines |
| Executive Secretary | Andrew B. Gonzales, F.S.C. | De La Salle University |
| Treasurer | Emy M. Pascasio | Ateneo de Manila University |
| Board Members | Fe T. Otanes | Philippine Normal University |
| | Emy M. Pascasio | Ateneo de Manila University |
| | Wilfredo L. Alberca | Polytechnic University of the Philippines |
| | Ponciano B.P. Pineda | Institute of National Language |
| | Hartmut Wiens | Summer Institute of Linguistics |
| | Ma. Lourdes S. Bautista | De La Salle University |
| President Emeritus | Bonifacio P. Sibayan | Philippine Normal University |

1991 - 1992
| Position | Name | Institution Affiliation |
|---|---|---|
| President | Ma. Lourdes S. Bautista | De La Salle University |
| Vice-President | Emma S. Castillo | Philippine Normal University |
| Executive Secretary | Andrew B. Gonzales, F.S.C. | De La Salle University |
| Treasurer | Emy M. Pascasio | Ateneo de Manila University |
| Board Members | Fe T. Otanes | Philippine Normal University |
| | Ma. Clara V. Ravina | University of the Philippines |
| | Emy M. Pascasio | Ateneo de Manila University |
| | Wilfredo L. Alberca | Polytechnic University of the Philippines |
| | Ponciano B.P. Pineda | Institute of National Language |
| | Hartmut Wiens | Summer Institute of Linguistics |
| President Emeritus | Bonifacio P. Sibayan | Philippine Normal University |

1990 - 1991
| Position | Name | Institution Affiliation |
|---|---|---|
| President | Wilfredo L. Alberca | Polytechnic University of the Philippines |
| Vice-President | Ma. Lourdes S. Bautista | De La Salle University |
| Executive Secretary | Andrew B. Gonzales, F.S.C. | De La Salle University |
| Treasurer | Teresita Cendaña | University of Santo Tomas |
| Board Members | Edilberto P. Dagot | Philippine Normal University |
| | Fe T. Otanes | Philippine Normal University |
| | Emy M. Pascasio | Ateneo de Manila University |
| | Ponciano B.P. Pineda | Institute of National Language |
| | Ma. Clara V. Ravina | University of the Philippines |
| | Hartmut Wiens | Summer Institute of Linguistics |
| President Emeritus | Bonifacio P. Sibayan | Philippine Normal University |

1989 - 1990
| Position | Name | Institution Affiliation |
|---|---|---|
| President | Nelly I. Cubar | University of the Philippines |
| Vice-President | Wilfredo Alberca | Polytechnic University of the Philippines |
| Executive Secretary | Andrew B. Gonzales, F.S.C. | De La Salle University |
| Treasurer | Teresita Cendaña | University of Santo Tomas |
| Board Members | Fe T. Otanes | Philippine Normal College |
| | Ma. Lourdes S. Bautista | De La Salle University |
| | Emy M. Pascasio | Ateneo de Manila University |
| | Edilberto P. Dagot | Philippine Normal College |
| | Ponciano B.P. Pineda | Institute of National Language |
| | Hartmut Wiens | Summer Institute of Linguistics |
| President Emeritus | Bonifacio P. Sibayan | Philippine Normal College |

1988-1989
| Position | Name | Institution Affiliation |
|---|---|---|
| President | Fe T. Otanes | Philippine Normal College |
| Vice-President | Nelly I. Cubar | University of the Philippines |
| Executive Secretary | Andrew B. Gonzales, F.S.C. | De La Salle University |
| Treasurer | Teresita Cendaña | University of Santo Tomas |
| Board Members | David Ohlson | Summer Institute of Linguistics |
| | Edilberto P. Dagot | Philippine Normal College |
| | Ma. Lourdes S. Bautista | De La Salle University |
| | Emy M. Pascasio | Ateneo de Manila University |
| | Wilfredo L. Alberca | Polytechnic University of the Philippines |
| | Ponciano B.P. Pineda | Institute of National Language & Ministry of Education and Culture |
| President Emeritus | Bonifacio P. Sibayan | Philippine Normal College |

1987 - 1988
| Position | Name | Institution Affiliation |
|---|---|---|
| President | Emy M. Pascasio | Ateneo de Manila University |
| Vice-President | Fe T. Otanes | Philippine Normal College |
| Executive Secretary | Andrew B. Gonzales, F.S.C. | De La Salle University |
| Treasurer | Teresita Cendaña | University of Santo Tomas |
| Board Members | David Ohlson | Summer Institute of Linguistics |
| | Edilberto P. Dagot | Philippine Normal College |
| | Ma. Lourdes S. Bautista | De La Salle University |
| | Nelly I. Cubar | University of the Philippines |
| | Ponciano B.P. Pineda | Institute of National Language & |
| | | Ministry of Education and Culture |
| | Wilfredo L. Alberca | Polytechnic University of the Philippines |
| President Emeritus | Bonifacio P. Sibayan | Philippine Normal College |

1986 - 1987
| Position | Name | Institution Affiliation |
|---|---|---|
| President | Ponciano B.P. Pineda | Institute of National Language & |
| | | Ministry of Education and Culture |
| Vice-President | Emy M. Pascasio | Ateneo de Manila University |
| Executive Secretary | Andrew B. Gonzales, F.S.C. | De La Salle University |
| Treasurer | Fe T. Otanes | Philippine Normal College |
| Board Members | David Ohlson | Summer Institute of Linguistics |
| | Edilberto P. Dagot | Philippine Normal College |
| | Ma. Lourdes S. Bautista | De La Salle University |
| | Nelly I. Cubar | University of the Philippines |
| | Wilfredo L. Alberca | Polytechnic University of the Philippines |
| | Teresita Cendaña | University of Santo Tomas |

1983 - 1986
| Position | Name | Institution Affiliation |
|---|---|---|
| President | Bonifacio P. Sibayan | Philippine Normal College |
| Vice-President | Ponciano B.P. Pineda | Institute of National Language & |
| | | Ministry of Education and Culture |
| Executive Secretary | Andrew B. Gonzales, F.S.C. | De La Salle University |
| Treasurer | Fe T. Otanes | Philippine Normal College |
| Board Members | Edilberto P. Dagot | Philippine Normal College |
| | Ma. Lourdes S. Bautista | De La Salle University |
| | Nelly I. Cubar | University of the Philippines |
| | Emy M. Pascasio | Ateneo de Manila University |
| | David Ohlson | Summer Institute of Linguistics |

1982-1983
| Position | Name | Institution Affiliation |
|---|---|---|
| President | Bonifacio P. Sibayan | Philippine Normal College |
| Vice-President | Ponciano B.P. Pineda | Institute of National Language & Ministry of Education and Culture |
| Executive Secretary | Andrew B. Gonzales, F.S.C. | De La Salle University |
| Treasurer | Fe T. Otanes | Philippine Normal College |
| Board Members | Edilberto P. Dagot | Philippine Normal College |
| | Ma. Lourdes S. Bautista | De La Salle University |
| | Emy M. Pascasio | Ateneo de Manila University |
| | David Ohlson | Summer Institute of Linguistics |

1981 - 1982
| Position | Name | Institution Affiliation |
|---|---|---|
| President | Bonifacio P. Sibayan | Philippine Normal College |
| Vice-President | Ponciano B.P. Pineda | Institute of National Language & |
| | | Ministry of Education and Culture |
| Executive Secretary | Andrew B. Gonzales, F.S.C. | De La Salle University |
| Treasurer | Fe T. Otanes | Philippine Normal College |
| Board Members | Emy M. Pascasio | Ateneo de Manila University |
| | Leonard Newell | Summer Institute of Linguistics |
| | Edilberto P. Dagot | Philippine Normal College |
| | Jonathan Malicsi | University of the Philippines |

1980 - 1981
| Position | Name | Institution Affiliation |
|---|---|---|
| President | Bonifacio P. Sibayan | Philippine Normal College |
| Vice-President | Ponciano B.P. Pineda | Institute of National Language & |
| | | Ministry of Education and Culture |
| Executive Secretary | Andrew B. Gonzales, F.S.C. | De La Salle University |
| Treasurer | Fe T. Otanes | Philippine Normal College |
| Board Members | Leonard Newell | Summer Institute of Linguistics |
| | Edilberto P. Dagot | Philippine Normal College |
| | Ma. Lourdes S. Bautista | De La Salle University |
| | Emy M. Pascasio | Ateneo de Manila University |

1979 - 1980
| Position | Name | Institution Affiliation |
|---|---|---|
| President | Bonifacio P. Sibayan | Philippine Normal College |
| Vice-President | Ponciano B.P. Pineda | Institute of National Language & |
| | | Ministry of Education and Culture |
| Executive Secretary | Andrew B. Gonzales, F.S.C. | De La Salle University |
| Treasurer | Fe T. Otanes | Philippine Normal College |
| Board Members | Edilberto P. Dagot | Philippine Normal College |
| | Leonard Newell | Summer Institute of Linguistics |
| | Emy M. Pascasio | Ateneo de Manila University |
| | Gloria Chan Yap | Ateneo de Manila University |

1977-1978
| Position | Name | Institution Affiliation |
|---|---|---|
| President | Bonifacio P. Sibayan | Philippine Normal College |
| Vice-President | Ponciano B.P. Pineda | Institute of National Language & Department of Education and Culture |
| Executive Secretary | Andrew B. Gonzales, F.S.C. | De La Salle University |
| Treasurer | Fe T. Otanes | Philippine Normal College |
| Board Members | Edilberto P. Dagot | Philippine Normal College |
| | Emy M. Pascasio | Ateneo de Manila University |
| | Dan H. Weaver | Summer Institute of Linguistics |
| | Ma. Lourdes S. Bautista | De La Salle University |

1975-1977
| Position | Name | Institution Affiliation |
|---|---|---|
| President | Bonifacio P. Sibayan | Philippine Normal College |
| Vice-President | Ponciano B.P. Pineda | Institute of National Language |
| Executive Secretary | Andrew B. Gonzales, F.S.C. | De La Salle University |
| Treasurer | Fe T. Otanes | Philippine Normal College |
| Board Members | Edilberto P. Dagot | Philippine Normal College |
| | Emy M. Pascasio | Ateneo de Manila University |
| | Dan H. Weaver | Summer Institute of Linguistics |

1970-1971
EXECUTIVE COMMITTEE
| Position | Name | Institution Affiliation |
|---|---|---|
| President | Teodoro A. Llamzon, S.J. | Ateneo de Manila |
| Vice-President | Bonifacio P. Sibayan | Philippine Normal College |
| Secretary | Edilberto P. Dagot | Philippine Normal College |
| Treasurer | Fe T. Otanes | Philippine Normal College |
| Executive Committee Members | Maximo D. Ramos | Alemar-Phoenix Publishing House |
| | Morris Cottle | Summer Institute of Linguistics |
| | Andrew B. Gonzales, F.S.C. | De la Salle College |
| COMMITTEE CHAIRPERSONS | | |
| Position | Name | Institution Affiliation |
| Committee on Publications | Teodoro A. Llamzon, S.J. | Ateneo de Manila |
| Committee on Membership | Ricardo Cutiongco | San Beda College |
| Committee on Research | Andrew B. Gonzales, F.S.C. | De la Salle College |
| Committee on Professional Meetings | Fe Aldave-Yap | Institute of National Language |
| Committee on Professional Relations | Alejandro J. Casambre | University of the Philippines |

1969 - 1970
EXECUTIVE COMMITTEE
| Position | Name | Institution Affiliation |
|---|---|---|
| President | Teodoro A. Llamzon, S.J. | Ateneo de Manila |
| Vice-President | Bonifacio P. Sibayan | Philippine Normal College |
| Secretary | Edilberto P. Dagot | Philippine Normal College |
| Treasurer | Fe T. Otanes | Philippine Normal College |
| Executive Committee Members | Rosalina M. Goulet | University of the Philippines |
| | J. Thomas Lyman | Summer Institute of Linguistics |
| | Maximo Ramos | University of the East |
| COMMITTEE CHAIRPERSONS | | |
| Position | Name | Institution Affiliation |
| Committee on Publications | Teodoro A. Llamzon, S.J. | Ateneo de Manila |
| Committee on Membership | Ricardo Cutiongco | San Beda College |
| Committee on Research | Cesar A. Hidalgo | University of the Philippines |
| Committee on Professional Meetings | Fe Aldave-Yap | Institute of National Language |
| Committee on Professional Relations | Alejandro J. Casambre | University of the Philippines |
