= Chicago Linguistic Society =

Student-run organization at the University of Chicago

The Chicago Linguistic Society (or CLS) is one of the oldest student-run organizations in the United States, based at the University of Chicago. Although its exact foundation date is obscure, according to Eric Hamp it is generally believed to antedate the Second World War, and possibly extends back to Bloomfield's and Sapir's tenure at the university in the 1920s and 1930s.

Since 1965, CLS has run an annual conference that has received an international status in linguistics comparable to BLS, the LSA, WCCFL and NELS. Focus on syntax, morphology, semantics, pragmatics, sociolinguistics, phonology, phonetics, and allied fields of cognitive and social sciences are presented at this conference. Special topics include Heritage Languages, Speech Acts, and Resumptivity.

In the 1970s, the Chicago Linguistic Society pioneered the practice of publishing "parajournals", which were conference papers bound in paperback, immediately following its conferences. The 2024 conference, the 60th Meeting of the Chicago Linguistic Society, was organized by Xiaobei Chen, Sercan Karakas, and Jaehong Shim at the University of Chicago, drawing the attention of linguists from around the world.
